= Comparative army enlisted ranks of Europe =

Rank comparison chart of non-commissioned officers (NCOs) and enlisted personnel for all armies and land forces of European states.

== NCO and enlisted ranks ==
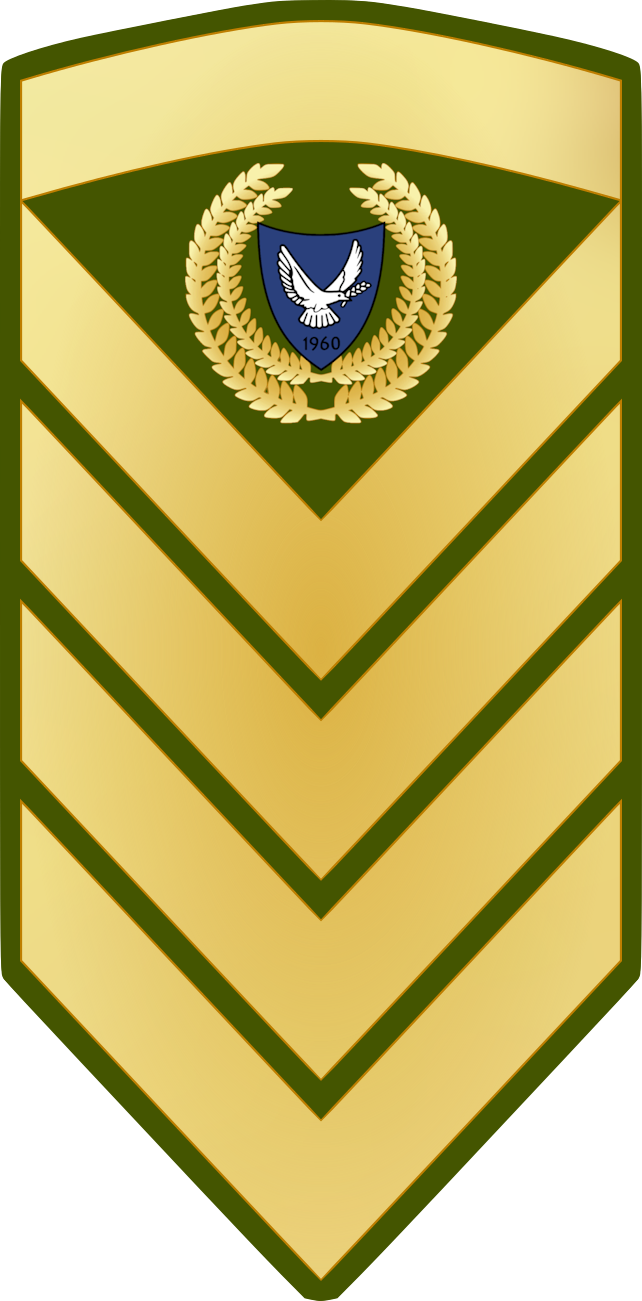
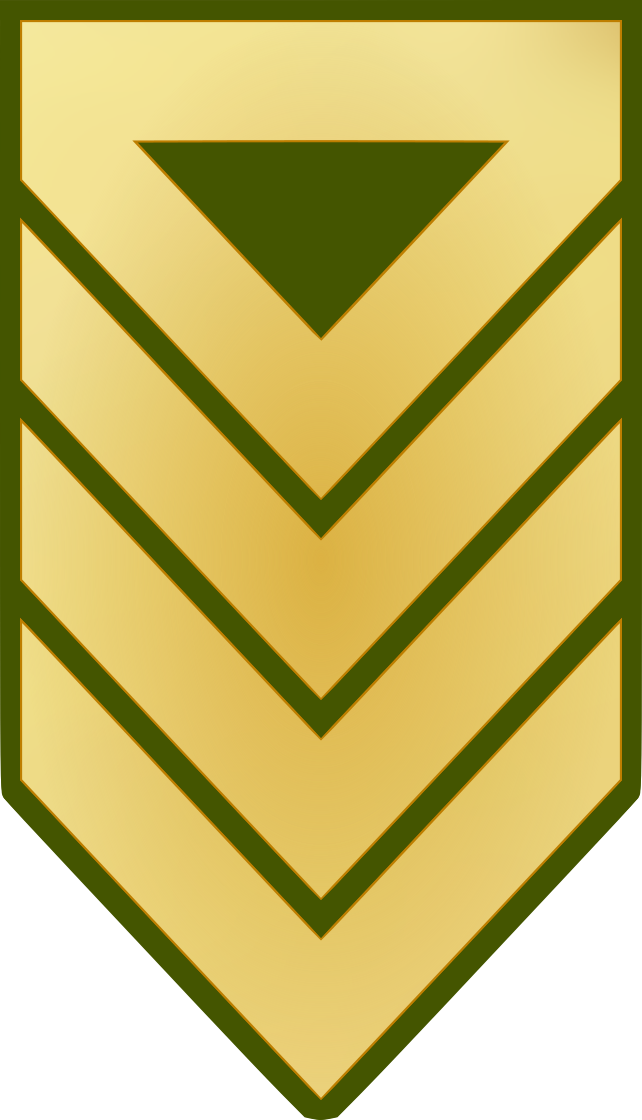
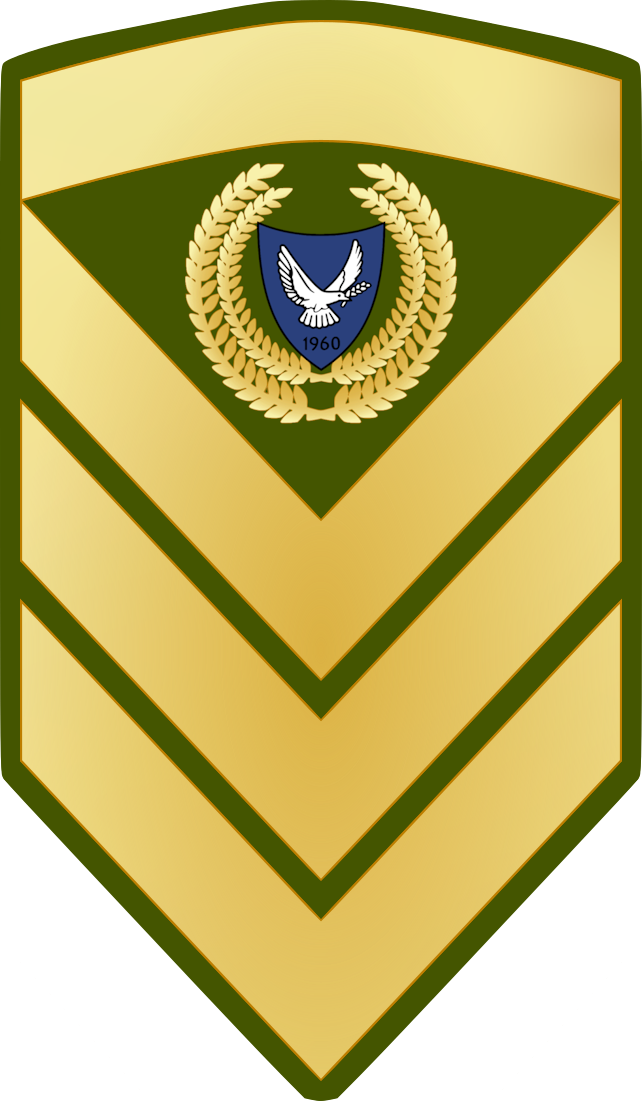
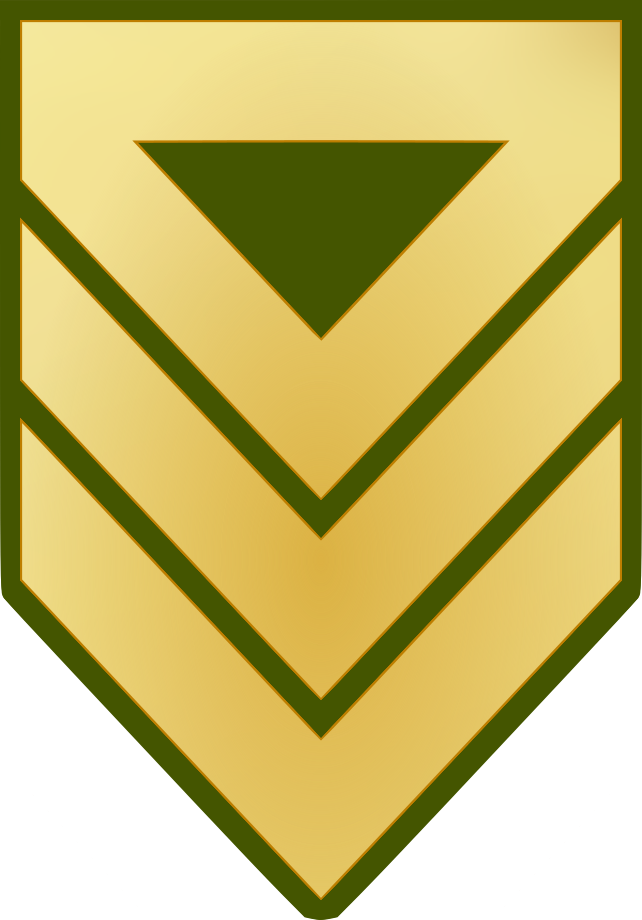
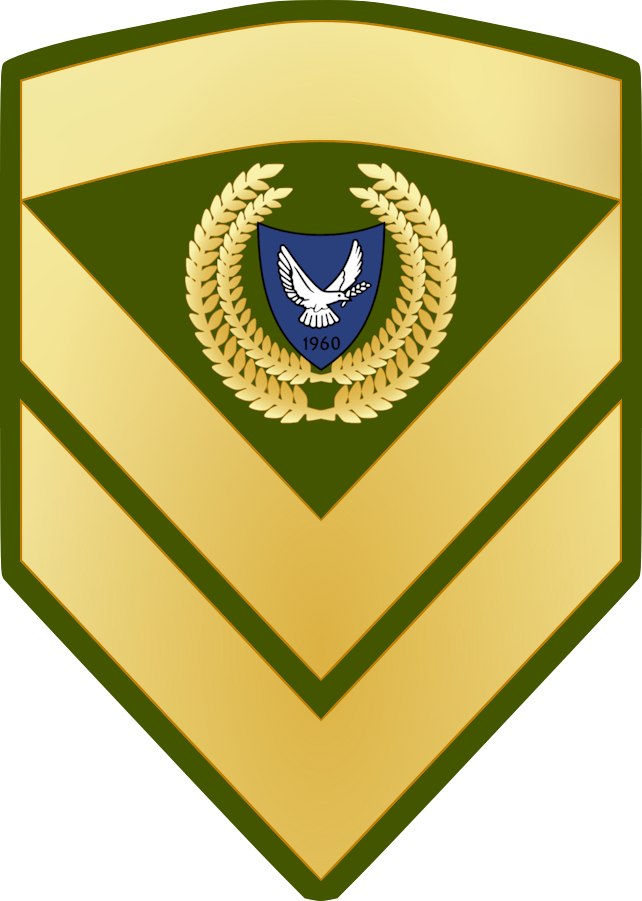
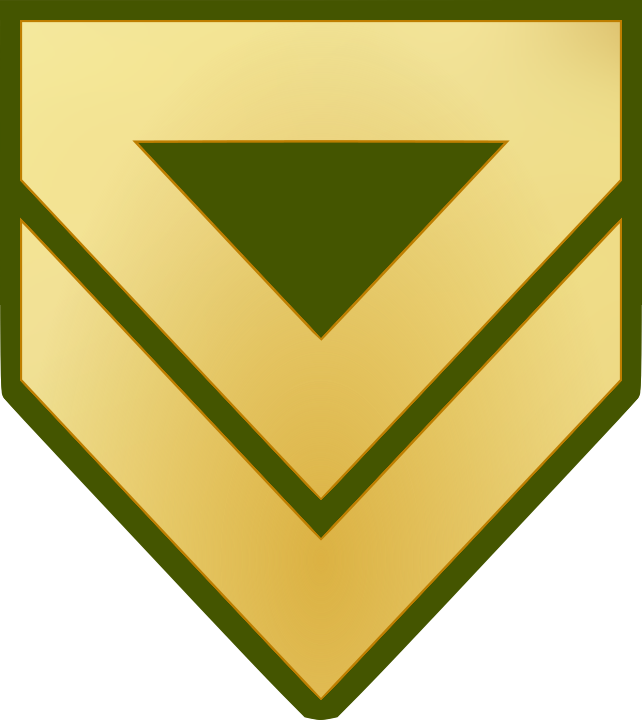
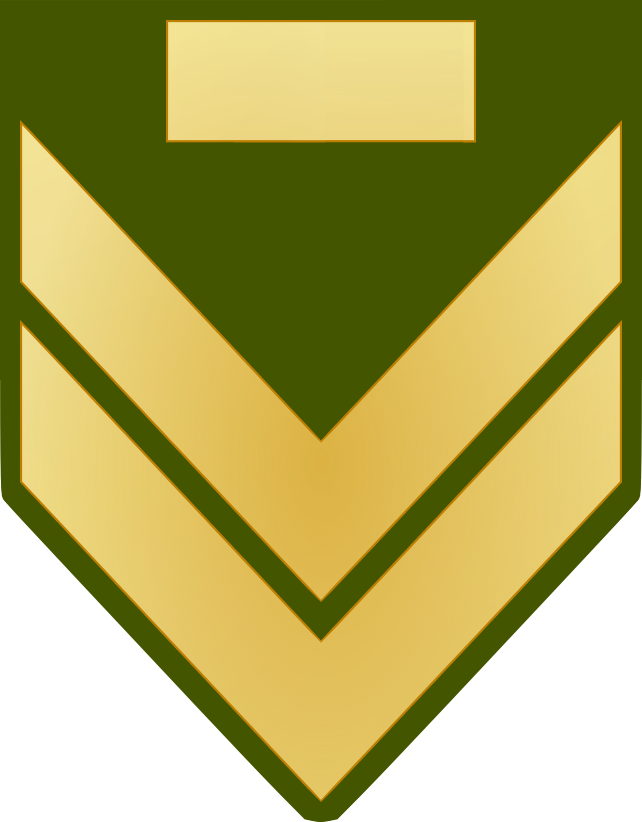
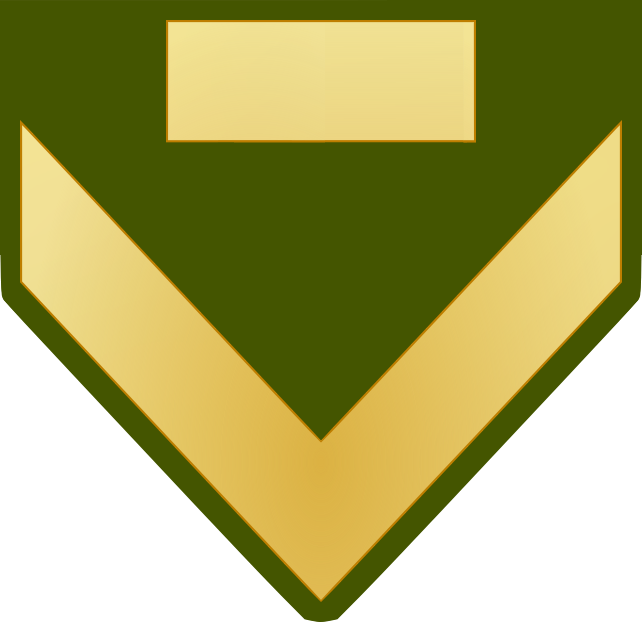
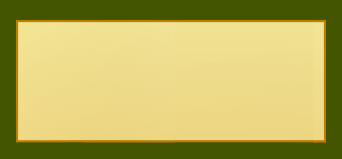
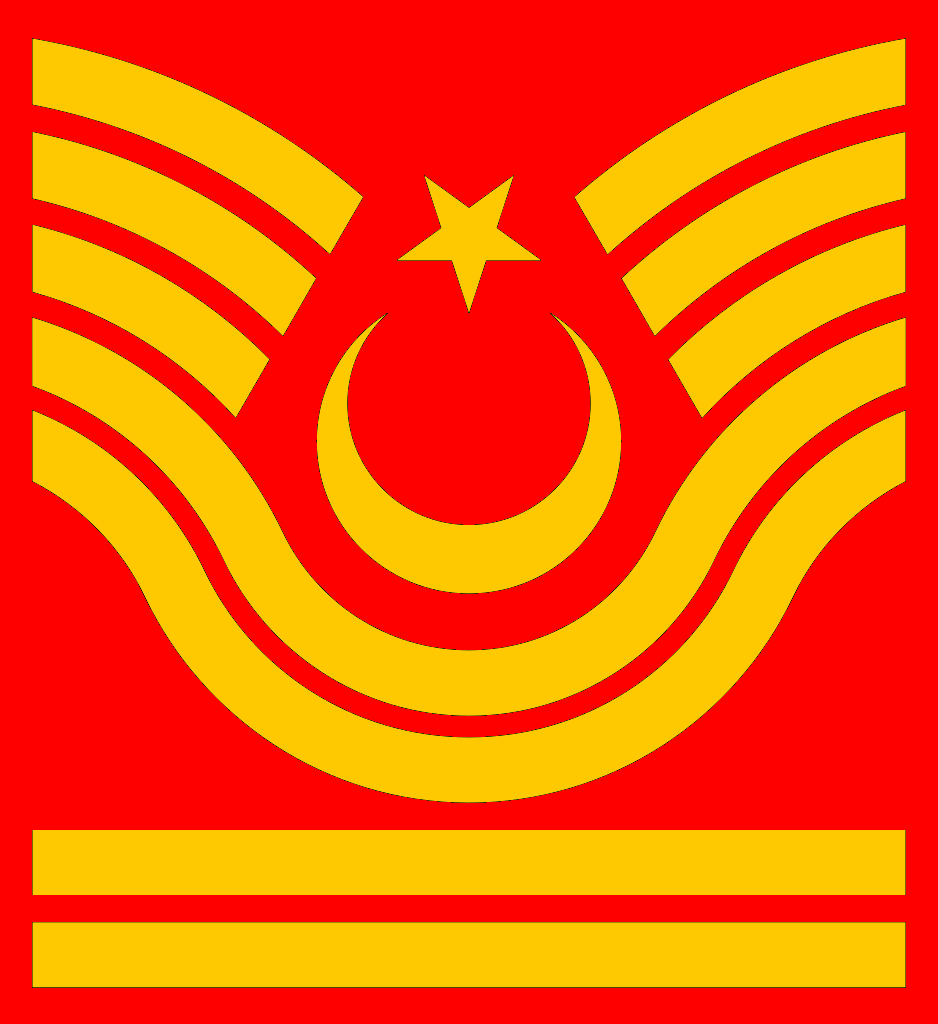
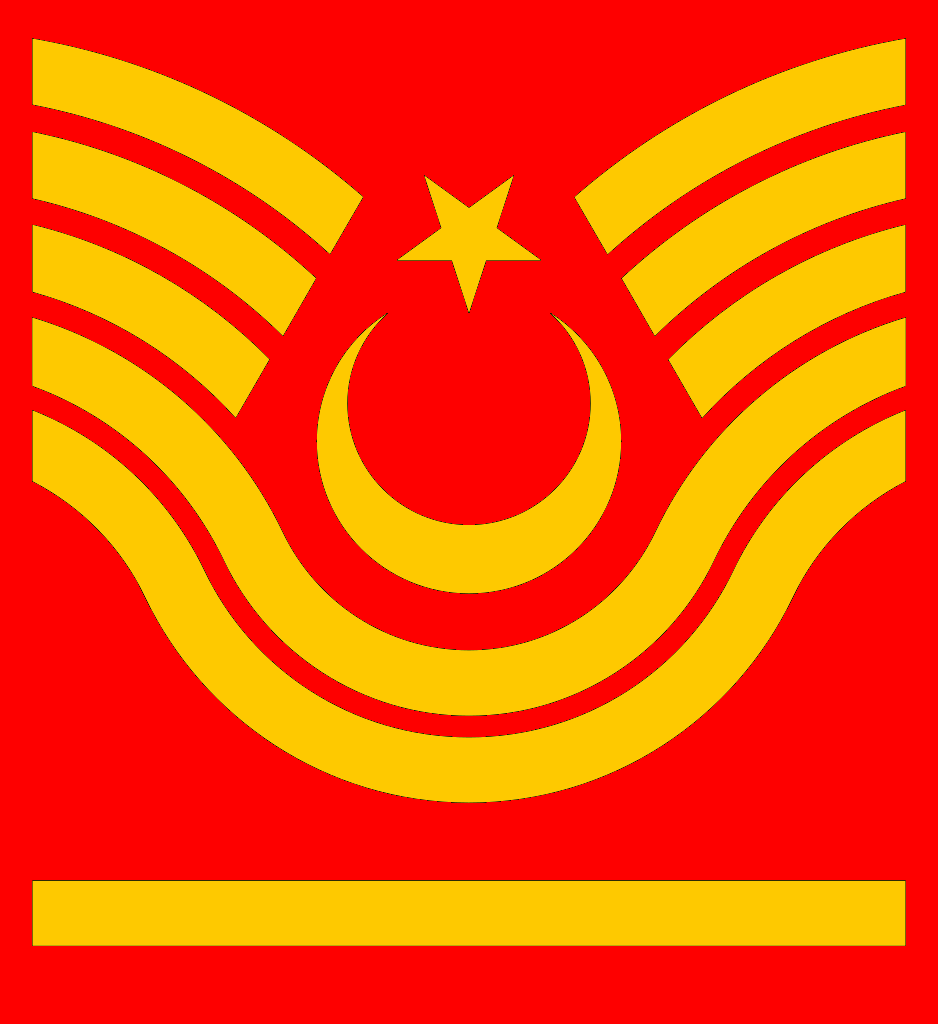
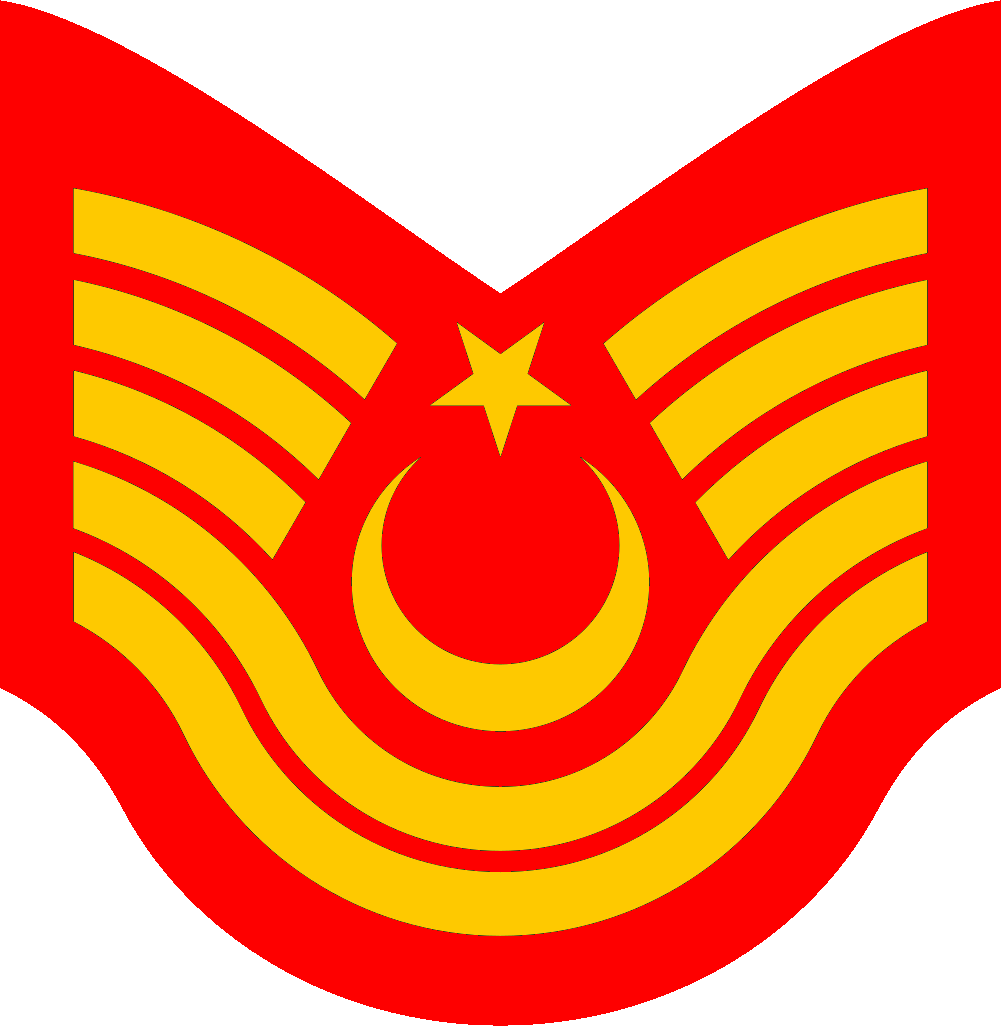
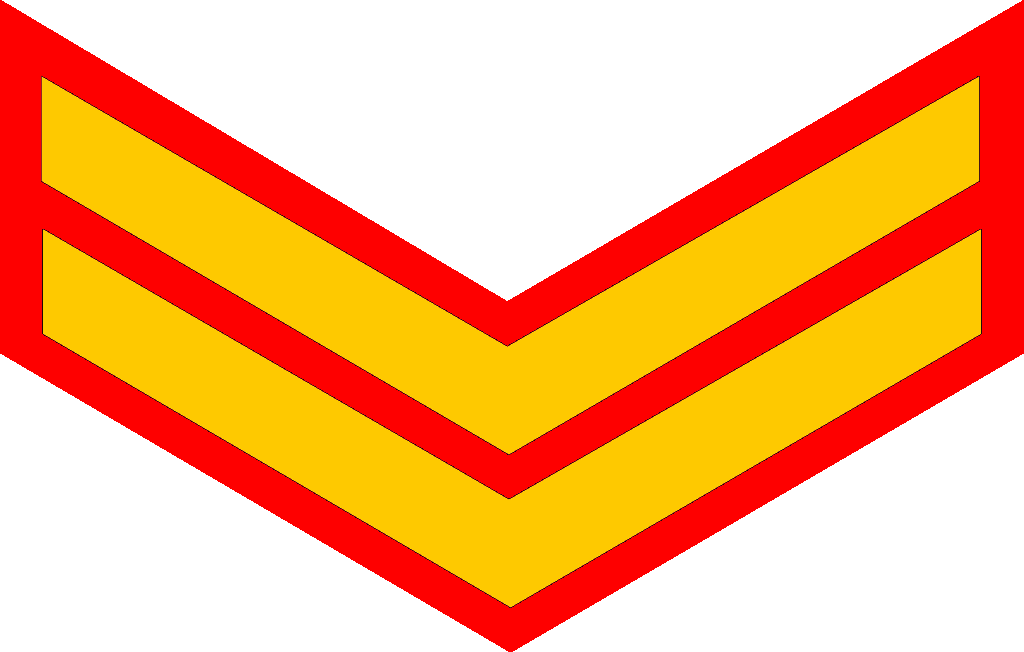
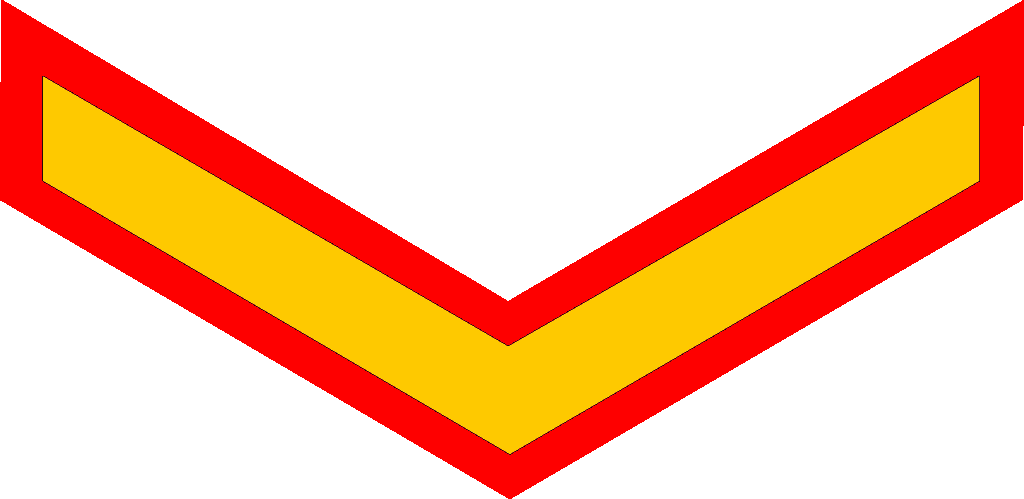
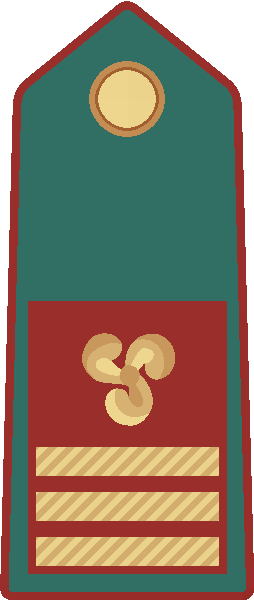
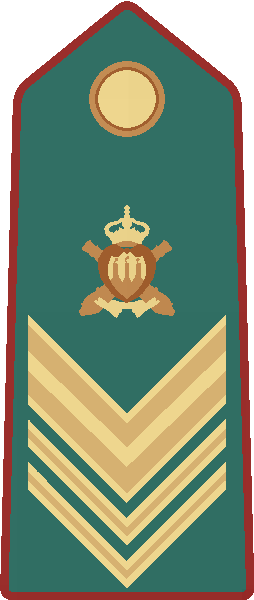
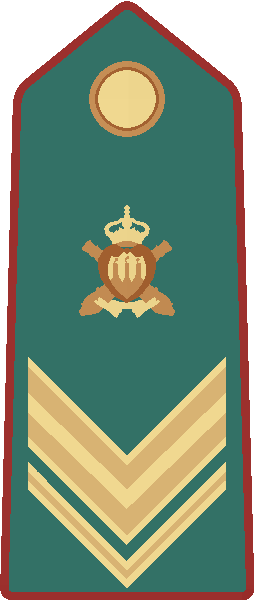
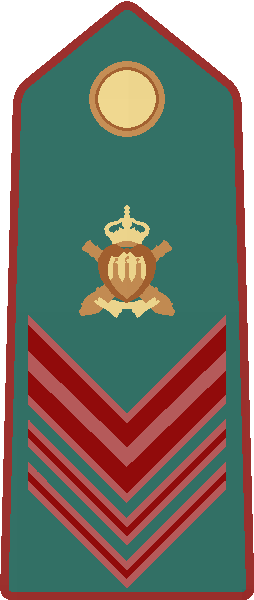
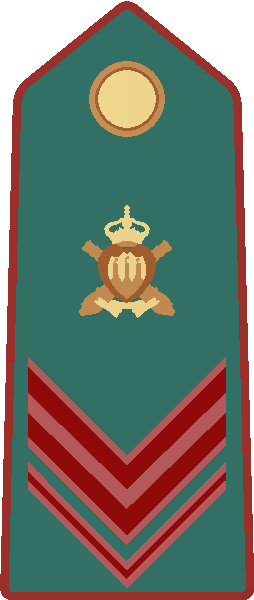
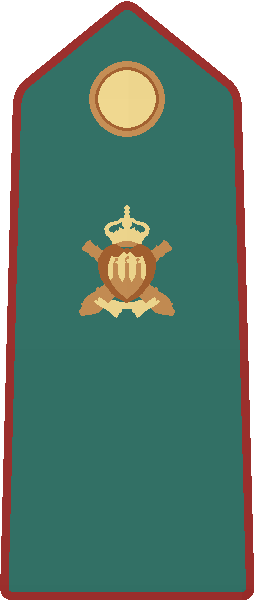
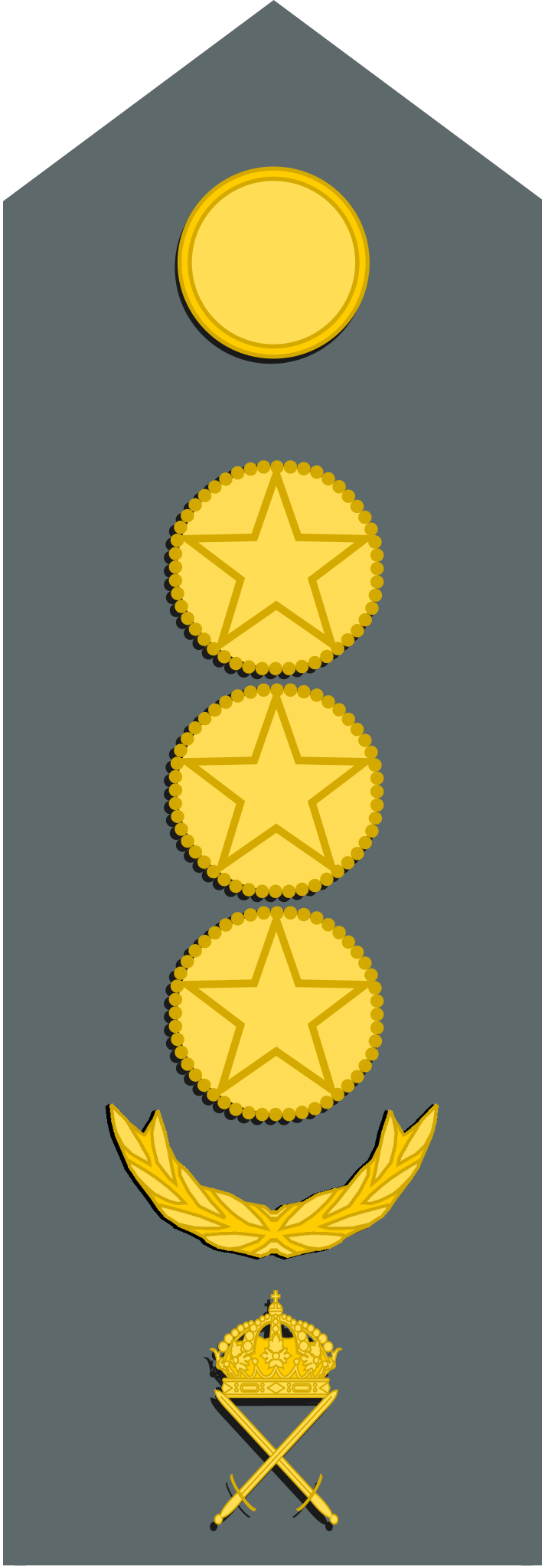
Rank group	Senior NCOs												Junior NCOs						Enlisted
Albanian Land Force
Albanian Land Force	Kryekapter			Kapter		Rreshter		Tetar		Nëntetar			Ushtar IV				Ushtar III		Ushtar II				Ushtar I
Austrian Land Forces
Austrian Land Forces	Vizeleutnant		Offiziersstellvertreter	Oberstabswachtmeister		Stabswachtmeister		Oberwachtmeister		Wachtmeister			Zugsführer				Korporal		Gefreiter				Rekrut
Belarusian Ground Forces
Belarusian Ground Forces	Старшы прапаршчык Staršy praparščyk		Прапаршчык; Praparščyk	Старшына; Staršyna		Старшы сяржант Staršy siaržant		Сяржант; Siaržant		Малодшы сяржант Malodšy siaržant			Яфрэйтар; Jafrejtar				Радавы; Radavy
Belgian Land Component
Belgian Land Component	Adjudant-majoor		Adjudant-chef	Adjudant		1ste sergeant-majoor		1ste sergeant-chef	1ste sergeant	Sergeant			1ste korporaal-chef		Korporaal-chef		Korporaal		1ste soldaat				Soldaat
Belgian Land Component	Adjudant-major		Adjudant-chef	Adjudant		Premier sergent-major		Premier sergent-chef	Premier sergent	Sergent			Premier caporal-chef		Caporal-chef		Caporal		Premier soldat				Soldat
Belgian Land Component	Majoradjutant		Chefadjudant	Adjudant		1er Sergeant major		1er Sergeant chef	1er Sergeant	Sergeant			1er Korporal chef		Korporal chef		Korporal		1er soldat				Soldat
Bosnian Ground Forces
Bosnian Ground Forces	Zastavnik 1 klase			Zastavnik		Stariji vodnik 1 klase		Stariji vodnik		Vodnik			Kaplar						Vojnik 1 klase				Vojnik
Bulgarian Land Forces
Bulgarian Land Forces	Офицерски кандидат Ofitserski kandidat			Старшина; Starshyna		Старши сержант Starshi serzhant		Сержант; Serzhant		Младши сержант Mladshi serzhant			Ефрейтор; Efreytor				Редник; Rednik
Croatian Army																							No insignia
Croatian Army	Časnički namjesnik			Stožerni narednik		Nadnarednik		Narednik		Desetnik			Skupnik				Razvodnik		Pozornik				Vojnik
Cypriot Ground Forces																							Arm/corps insignia only
Cypriot Ground Forces	Ανθυπασπιστής; Anthypaspistís			Αρχιλοχίας; Archilochías		Επιλοχίας; Epilochías		Λοχίας; Lochías					Δεκανέας; Dekanéas				Υποδεκανέας; Ypodekanéas						Στρατιώτης; Stratiótis
Northern Cypriot; Security Forces Command																							No insignia
Northern Cypriot; Security Forces Command	Astsubay kıdemli baş çavuş			Astsubay baş çavuş		Astsubay kıdemli üst çavuş		Astsubay üst çavuş		Astsubay kıdemli çavuş	Astsubay çavuş		Çavuş				Onbaşı						Erler
Czech Land Forces
Czech Land Forces	Štábní praporčík			Nadpraporčík		Praporčík		Nadrotmistr		Rotmistr			Rotný				Četař		Desátník				Svobodník	Vojín
Royal Danish Army
Royal Danish Army	Chefsergent			Seniorsergent		Oversergent				Sergent	Sergent (Officerselev)		Korporal				Overkonstabel af 1. grad		Overkonstabel				Konstabel
Rank group	Senior NCOs												Junior NCOs						Enlisted
Estonian Land Forces
Estonian Land Forces	Ülemveebel		Staabiveebel	Vanemveebel		Veebel		Nooremveebel		Vanemseersant			Seersant		Nooremseersant				Kapral				Reamees
French Army
French Army	Major		Adjudant-chef	Adjudant		Sergent-chef BM2/ Maréchal-des-logis-chef de 1^{ere} classe		Sergent-chef/ Maréchal-des-logis-chef		Sergent/ Maréchal-des-logis			Caporal-chef de 1^{re} classe		Caporal-chef/ Brigadier-chef		Caporal/ Brigadier		Soldat de 1^{re} classe				Soldat
Finnish Army
Finnish Army	Sotilasmestari			Ylivääpeli		Vääpeli		Ylikersantti		Kersantti			Alikersantti				Korpraali		Sotamies
Finnish Army	Militärmästare			Överfältväbel		Fältväbel		Översergeant		Sergeant			Undersergeant				Korpral		Soldat
Georgian Land Forces
მთავარი სერჟანტი Mtavari serzhant’i				მასტერ-სერჟანტი Mast’er-serzhant’i	უფროსი სერჟანტი Uprosi serzhant’i		სერჟანტი Serzhant’i		უმცროსი სერჟანტი Umtsrosi serzhant’i	კაპრალ-სპეციალისტი K’ap’ral-sp’etsialist’i	კაპრალი K’ap’rali		I კლასის რიგითი I k’lasis rigiti					რიგითი Rigiti
German Army
German Army	Oberstabsfeldwebel			Stabsfeldwebel		Hauptfeldwebel		Oberfeldwebel	Feldwebel	Stabsunteroffizier	Unteroffizier		Stabskorporal	Korporal	Oberstabsgefreiter	Stabsgefreiter	Hauptgefreiter	Obergefreiter	Gefreiter				Soldat
German Army (Officer designate)
German Army (Officer designate)						Oberfähnrich		Fähnrich		Fahnenjunker
Hellenic Army																							Arm/corps insignia only
Hellenic Army	Ανθυπασπιστής (Note: Greece has only one level of Warrant Officer. According to the current issue (2021) of STANAG 2116, the Greek Warrant Officers are included in OR-9, however they are afforded the privileges of an officer. See STANAG 2116 note 29, page D-9); Anthypaspistis			Αρχιλοχίας; Archilochias		Επιλοχίας; Epilochias		Λοχίας; Lochias					Δεκανέας; Dekaneas				Υποδεκανέας; Ypodekaneas						Στρατιώτης; Stratiotis
Hungarian Ground Forces
Hungarian Ground Forces	Főtörzszászlós			Törzszászlós	Zászlós	Főtörzsőrmester		Törzsőrmester		Őrmester			Szakaszvezető				Tizedes		Őrvezető				Közkatona
Iceland Crisis Response Unit
Iceland Crisis Response Unit								Flokkstjóri 1.		Flokkstjóri 2.			Korporáll										Óbreyttur
Irish Army																							No insignia
Irish Army	Sergeant major			Regimental Quartermaster Sergeant		Company sergeant		Company quartermaster sergeant		Sergeant			Corporal				Private, 3 star		Private, 2 star				Recruit
Irish Army	Maor-Sáirsint Cathláin/Reisimint (Note: Battalion (Cathlán), Regiment (Reisimint))			Ceathrúsháirsint Cathláin/Reisimint		Sáirsint Complachta (Note: Battery (Ceallraí) in the Artillery. Squadron (Scuadrún) in the Cavalry.)		Ceathrúsháirsint Complachta		Sáirsint			Ceannaire				Saighdiúr Singil, 3 Réalta		Saighdiúr Singil, 2 Réalta				Earcach
Italian Army				Maresciallo capo / Maresciallo ordinario / Maresciallo									Gradutato aiutante / Primo graduato / Graduato capo / Graduato scelto / Graduato
Italian Army	Primo luogotenente	Luogotenente	Primo maresciallo	Maresciallo capo / Maresciallo ordinario / Maresciallo		Sergente maggiore aiutante	Sergente maggiore capo	Sergente maggiore		Sergente			Gradutato aiutante / Primo graduato / Graduato capo / Graduato scelto / Graduato				Caporal maggiore		Caporale				Soldato
Kosovo Security Force
Kosovo Security Force	Rreshter major			Rreshter i parë	Rreshter master	Rreshter i klasit të parë		Rreshter i stafit		Rreshter			Tetar		Specialist		Ushtari o klasit te parë		Ushtar
Rank group	Senior NCOs												Junior NCOs						Enlisted
Latvian Land Forces
Latvian Land Forces	Augstākais virsseržants			Galvenais virsseržants		Štāba virsseržants		Virsseržants		Seržants			Kaprālis				Dižkareivis		Kareivis
Liechtenstein	No army
Lithuanian Land Force
Lithuanian Land Force	Seržantas majoras			Viršila		Štabo seržantas		Vyresnysis seržantas		Seržantas			Grandinis				Vyresnysis eilinis		Eilinis				Jaunesnysis eilinis
Luxembourg Army
Luxembourg Army	Adjudant-major		Adjudant-chef	Adjudant		Sergent-chef		Premier sergent		Sergent			Premier caporal-chef		Caporal-chef		Caporal de première classe	Caporal	Premier soldat-chef		Soldat-chef		Soldat de première classe	Soldat
North Macedonia Ground Forces																							No insignia
North Macedonia Ground Forces	Главен наредник Glaven narednik			Наредник; Narednik		Постар водник I класа Postar vodnik I klasa		Постар водник Postar vodnik		Водник 1 класа Vodnik 1 klasa			Водник; Vodnik				Помлад водник Pomlad vodnik	Десетар; Desetar	Разводник; Razvodnik				Војник; Vojnik
Army of Malta																			No insignia
Army of Malta	Warrant officer class 1			Warrant officer class 2		Staff sergeant		Sergeant					Bombardier				Lance bombardier		Gunner (or equivalent)
Moldovan Ground Forces
Moldovan Ground Forces	Plutonier-adjutant		Plutonier-major	Plutonier		Sergent-major		Sergent		Sergent-interior			Caporal				Soldat
Army of Monaco
Army of Monaco	Adjudant-chef			Adjudant		Maréchal-des-logis-major		Maréchal-des-logis-chef		Maréchal-des-logis							Brigadier		Carabinier de première classe				Carabinier de deuxième classe
Montenegrin Ground Army
Montenegrin Ground Army	Zastavnik 1 klase			Zastavnik		Stariji vodnik 1 klase		Stariji vodnik		Vodnik 1 klase			Vodnik				Mlađi vodnik		Desetar				Razvodnik
Rank group	Senior NCOs												Junior NCOs						Enlisted
Royal Netherlands Army
Royal Netherlands Army	Adjudant-onderofficier					Sergeant-majoor/ Opperwachtmeester		Sergeant der 1e klasse/ Wachtmeester der 1e klasse		Sergeant/ Wachtmeester			Korporaal der 1e klasse				Korporaal		Soldaat/ Huzaar/ Kanonier der 1e klasse		Soldaat/ Huzaar/ Kanonier der 2e klasse		Soldaat/ Huzaar/ Kanonier der 3e klasse
Norwegian Army
Norwegian Army	Sersjantmajor			Kommandérsersjant		Stabssersjant		Oversersjant		Sersjant 1. klasse	Sersjant		Korporal				Visekorporal 1. klasse		Visekorporal				Ledende menig	Menig
Polish Land Forces
Polish Land Forces	Starszy chorąży sztabowy		Starszy chorąży	Chorąży				Młodszy chorąży		Starszy sierżant			Sierżant				Plutonowy	Starszy kapral	Kapral				Starszy szeregowy	Szeregowy
Portuguese Army
Portuguese Army	Sargento-mor		Sargento-chefe	Sargento-ajudante		Primeiro-sargento		Segundo-sargento		Furriel	Segundo-furriel		Cabo de secção				Cabo-adjunto		Primeiro-cabo		Segundo-cabo		Soldado
Romanian Land Forces
Romanian Land Forces	Plutonier adjutant principal		Plutonier adjutant	Plutonier-major		Plutonier		Sergent-major		Sergent			Caporal clasa I	Caporal clasa a II-a	Caporal clasa a III-a		Fruntaș		Soldat
Russian Ground Forces
Russian Ground Forces	Ста́рший пра́порщик Stárshiy práporshchik		Пра́порщик; Práporshchyk	Старшина́ Starshyná		Ста́рший сержа́нт Stárshiy serzhánt		Сержа́нт; Serzhánt		Мла́дший сержа́нт Mládshiy serzhánt			Ефре́йтор; Efréĭtor				Рядово́й; Ryadovóy
Sammarinese Guard of the Rock
Sammarinese Guard of the Rock	Sergente Maggiore aiutante							Sergente maggiore		Sergente							Caporale maggiore		Caporale				Guardia Milite
Serbian Army
Serbian Army	Заставник I класе Zastavnik I klase			Заставник; Zastavnik		Старији Водник I класе Stariji Vodnik I klase		Старији Водник; Stariji Vodnik		Водник; Vodnik			Млађи водник Mlađi vodnik				Десетар; Desetar		Разводник; Razvodnik				Војник; Vojnik
Slovak Ground Forces
Slovak Ground Forces	Štábny nadrotmajster			Nadrotmajster		Rotmajster		Rotný		Čatár			Desiatnik				Slobodník		Vojak 2. stupňa				Vojak 1. stupňa
Slovenian Ground Force
Slovenian Ground Force	Višji štabni praporščak	Štabni praporščak	Višji praporščak	Praporščak	Višji štabni vodnik	Štabni vodnik		Višji vodnik		Vodnik			Naddesetnik				Desetnik		Poddesetnik				Vojak
Rank group	Senior NCOs												Junior NCOs						Enlisted
Spanish Army
Spanish Army	Suboficial mayor		Subteniente	Brigada		Sargento primero		Sargento		Cabo mayor			Cabo primero				Cabo		Soldado de primera				Soldado
Swedish Army
Swedish Army	Regementsförvaltare			Förvaltare		Överfanjunkare	Fanjunkare	Översergeant	Sergeant	Överfurir	Furir		Korpral				Vicekorpral		Menig 4	Menig 3	Menig 2	Menig 1	Menig
Swiss Army																								No insignia
Swiss Army	Chefadjutant		Hauptadjutant	Stabsadjutant	Adjutant unteroffizier	Hauptfeldweibel	Fourier	Feldweibel		Oberwachtmeister	Wachtmeister		Korporal				Obergefreiter		Gefreiter				Soldat	Rekrut
Swiss Army	Adjudant-chef		Adjudant-major	Adjudant d'état-major	Adjudant sous-officier	Sergent-major chef	Fourrier	Sergent-major		Sergent chef	Sergent		Caporal				Appointé-chef		Appointé				Soldat	Recrue
Turkish Land Forces																							No insignia
Turkish Land Forces	Astsubay kıdemli başçavuş			Astsubay başçavuş		Astsubay kıdemli üstçavuş		Astsubay üstçavuş		Astsubay kıdemli çavuş	Astsubay çavuş	Astsubay astçavuş	Uzman çavuş		Çavuş		Uzman onbaşı	Onbaşı					Er
Ukrainian Ground Forces
Ukrainian Ground Forces	Головний майстер-сержант Holovnyi maister-serzhant		Старший майстер-сержант Starshyi maister-serzhant	Майстер-сержант; Maister-serzhant		Штаб-сержант; Shtab-serzhant		Головний сержант Holovnyi serzhant		Старший сержант Starshyi serzhant			Сержант; Serzhant				Молодший сержант Molodshyi serzhant		Старший солдат Starshyi soldat				Солдат; Soldat
British Army																			No insignia
British Army	Warrant officer class 1			Warrant officer class 2		Staff/Colour sergeant		Sergeant					Corporal				Lance corporal		Private (or equivalent)
Pontifical Swiss Guard
Pontifical Swiss Guard						Feldweibel				Wachtmeister			Korporal				Vizekorporal						Hellebardier
Rank group	Senior NCOs												Junior NCOs						Enlisted

== See also ==
- Military rank
- Comparative army officer ranks of Europe
- Comparative army enlisted ranks of the Americas
- Comparative army enlisted ranks of Asia
- Ranks and insignia of NATO armies enlisted
