= Comparative army enlisted ranks of Asia =

Rank comparison chart of non-commissioned officers and other personnel for armies/ land forces of Asian states.

== Other ranks ==
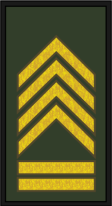
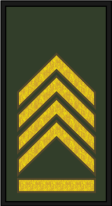
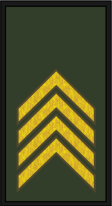
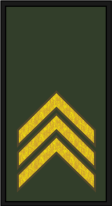
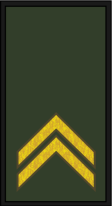
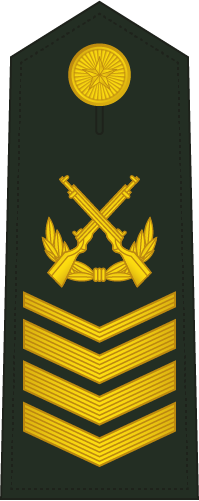
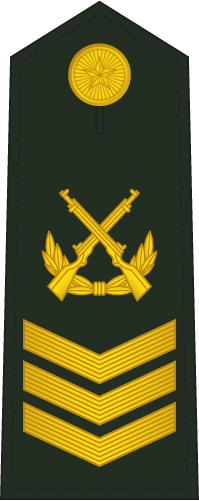
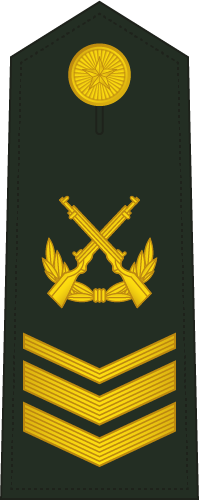
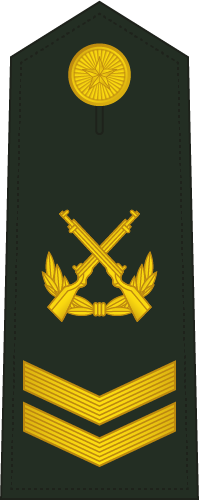
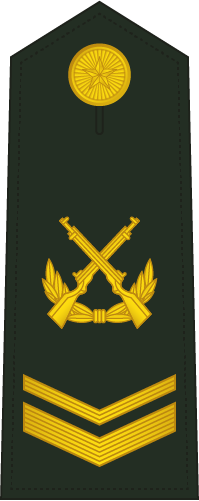
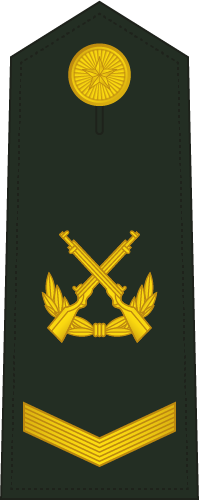
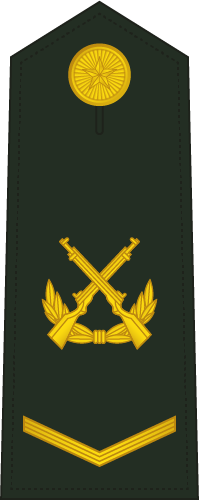
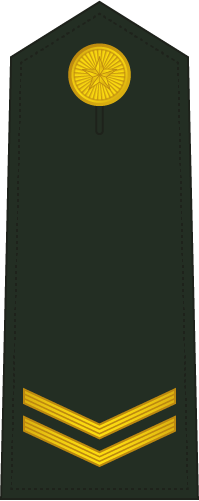
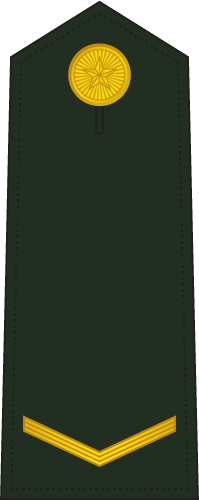
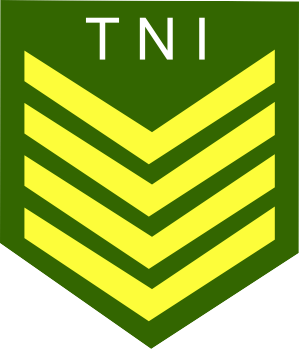
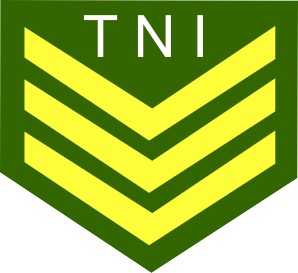
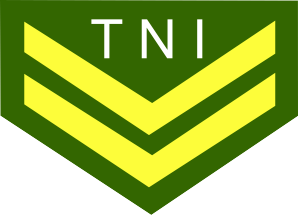
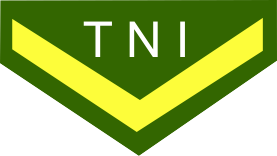
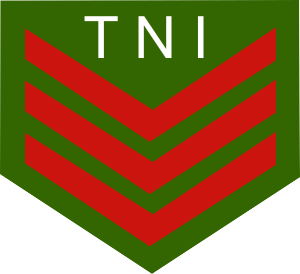
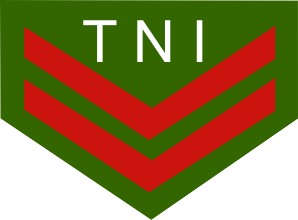
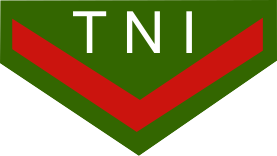
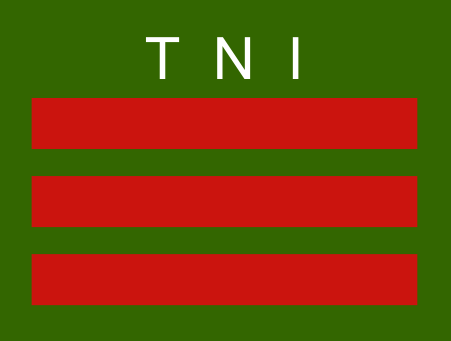
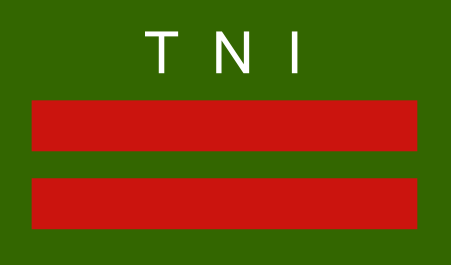
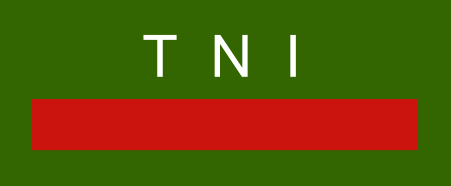
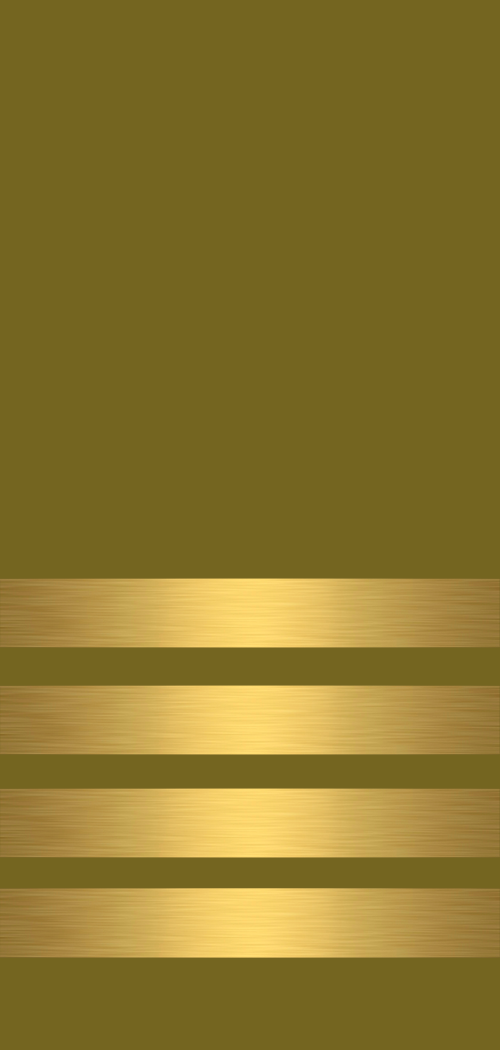
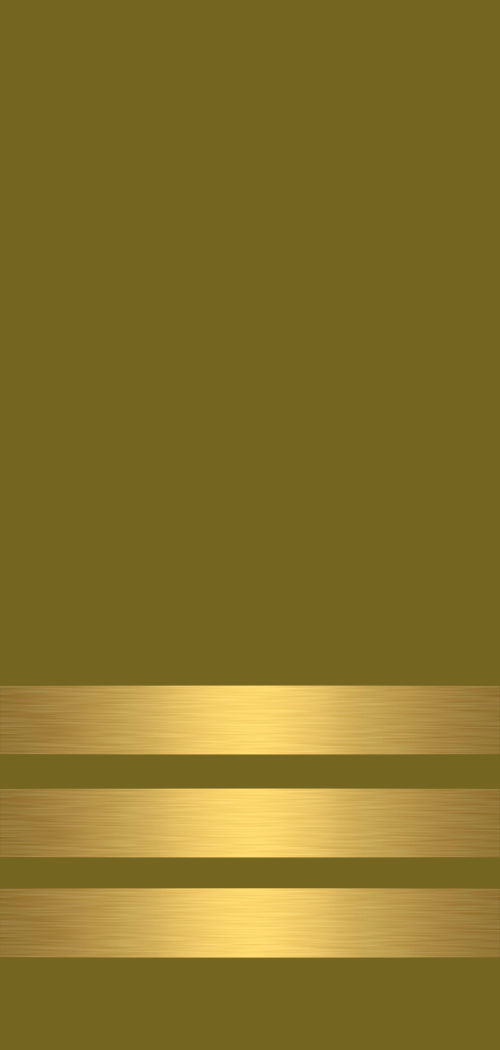
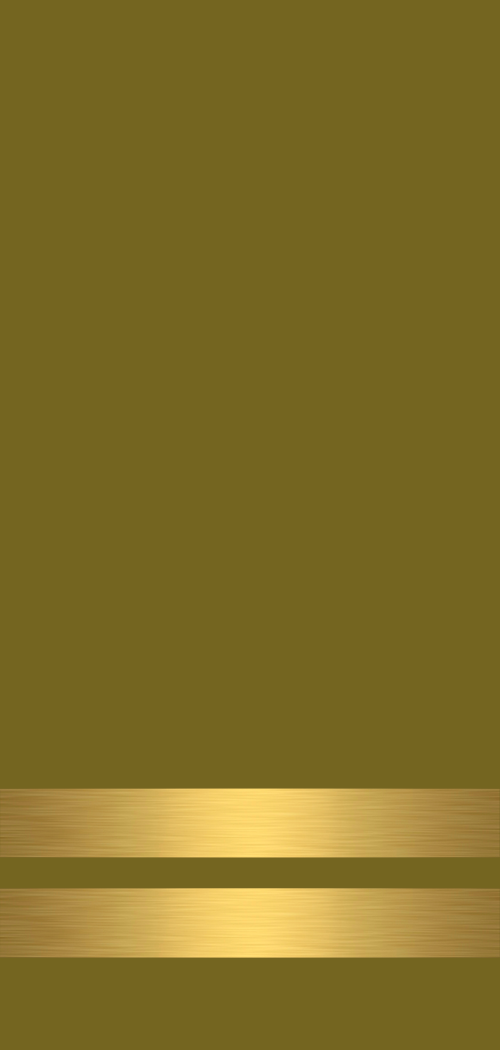
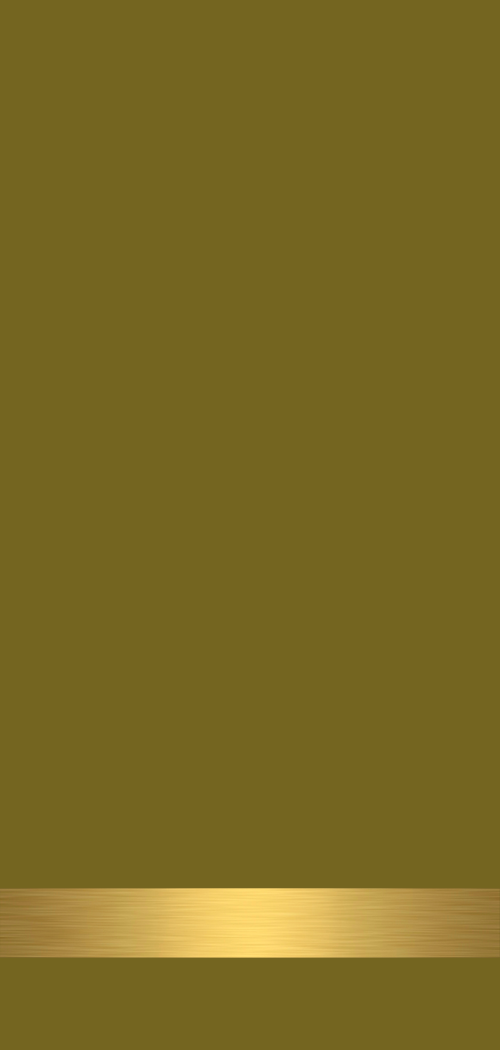
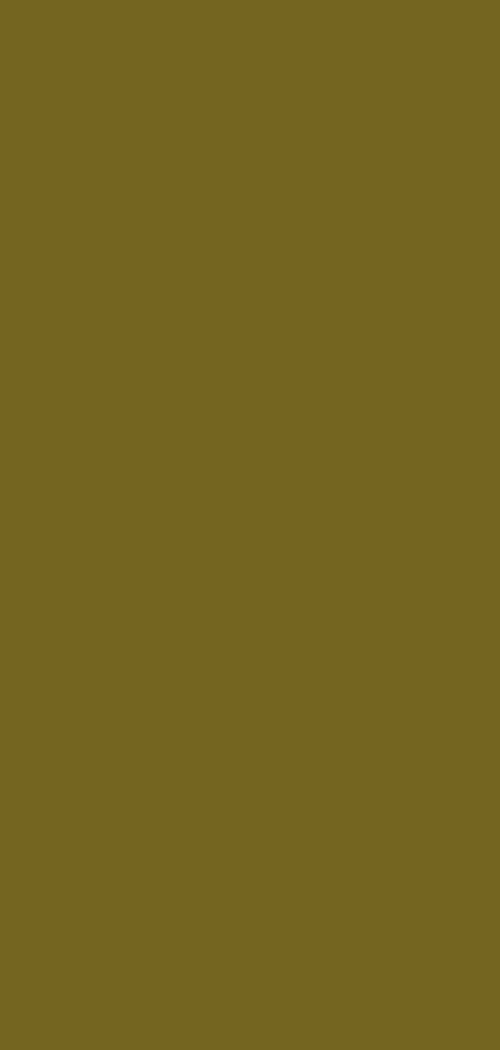
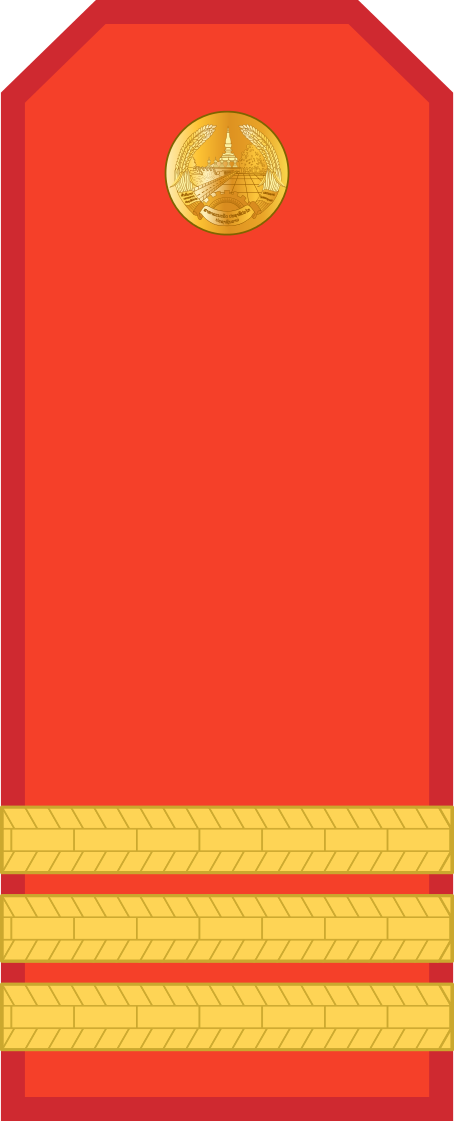
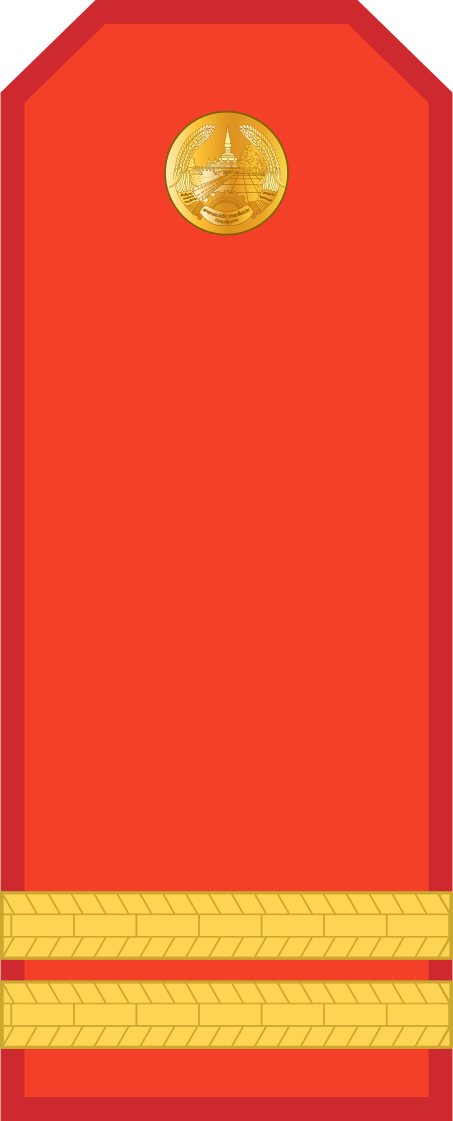
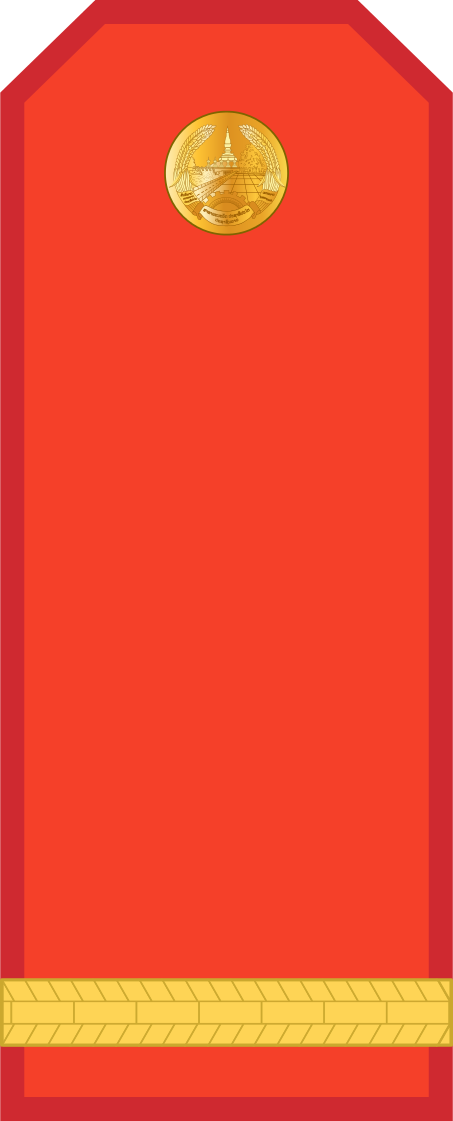
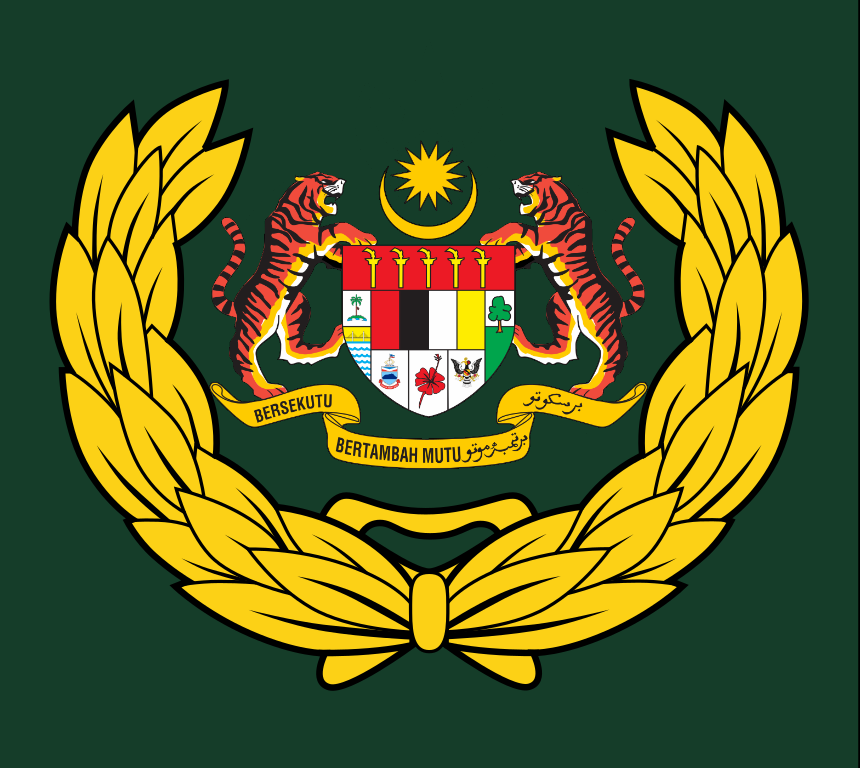
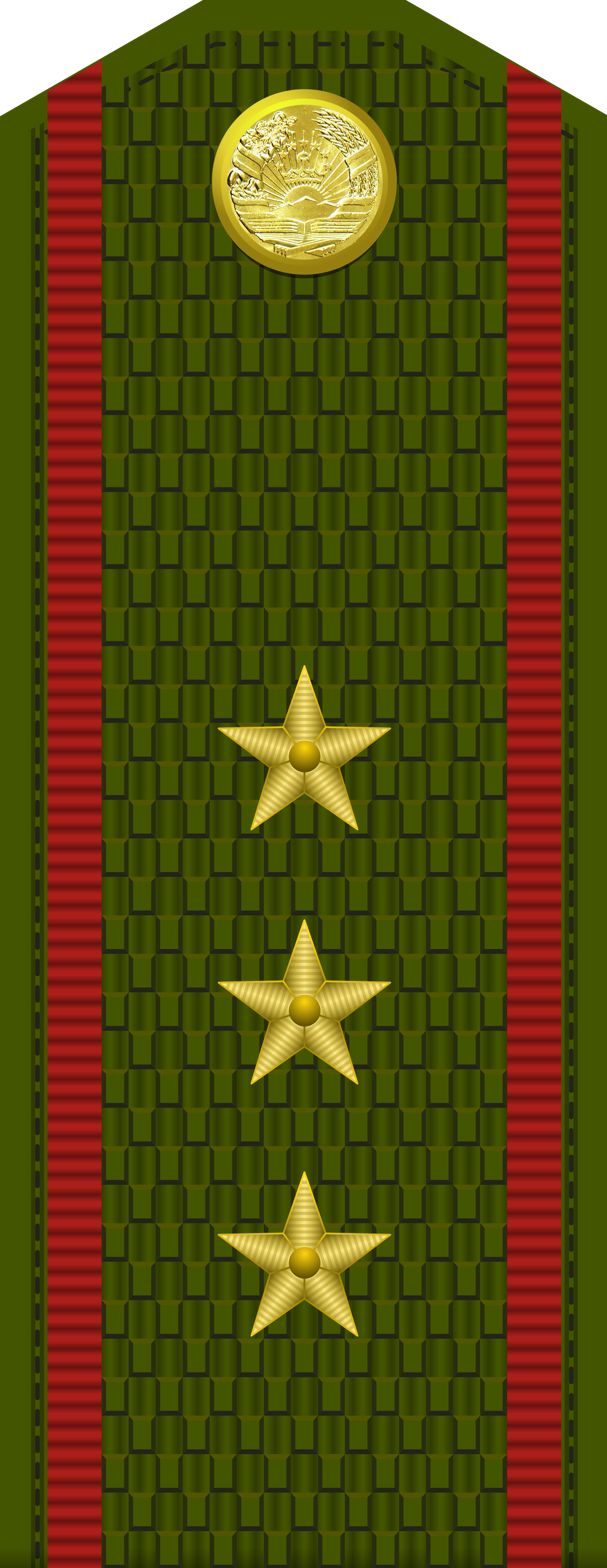
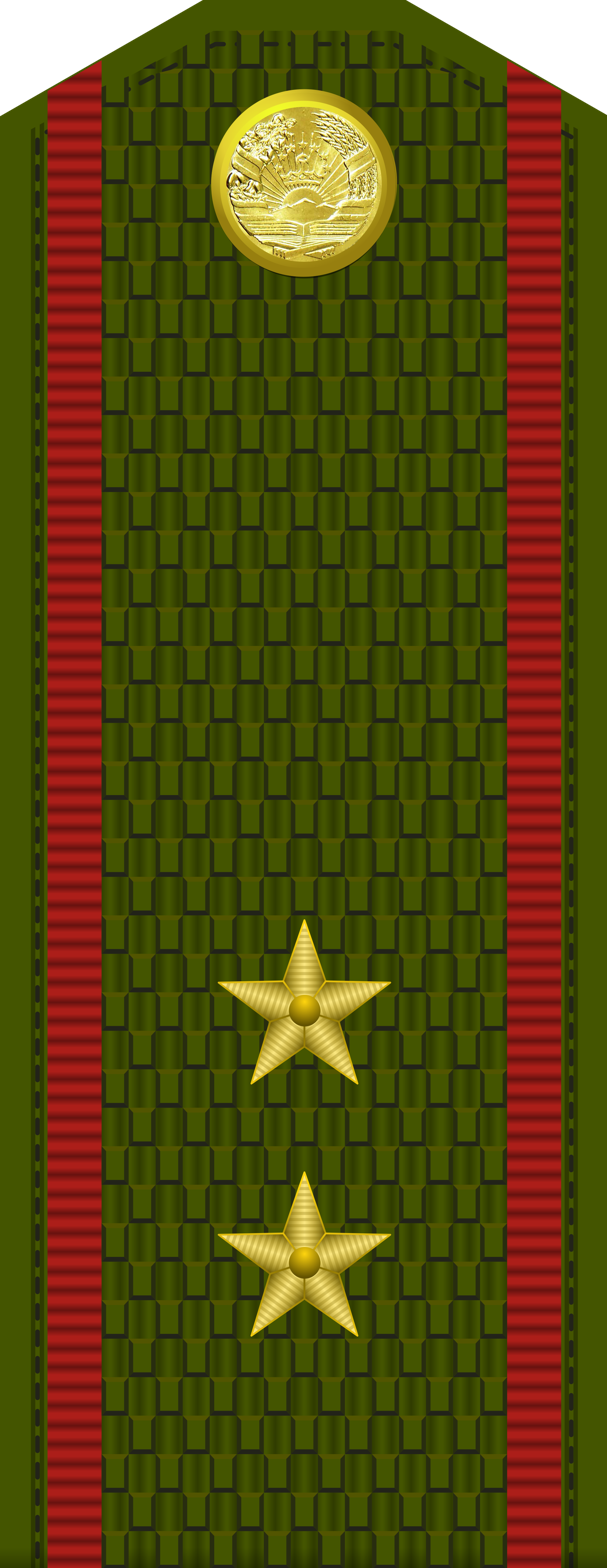
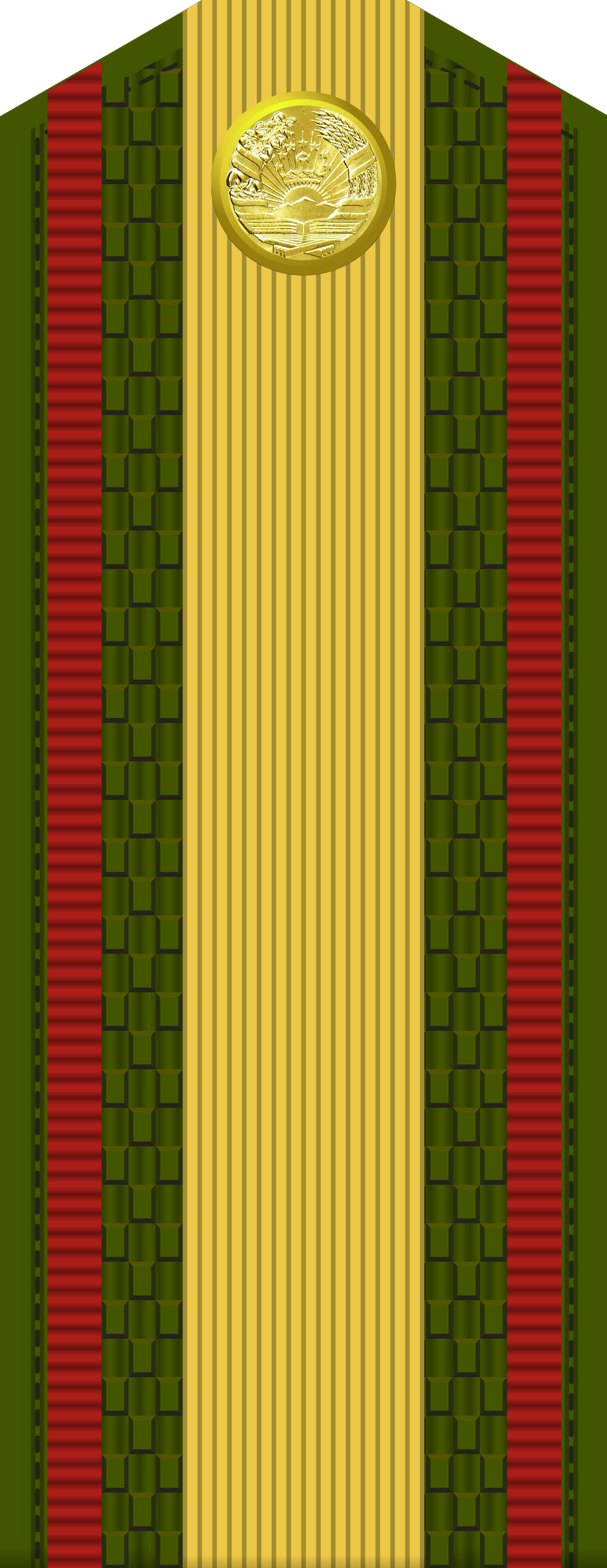
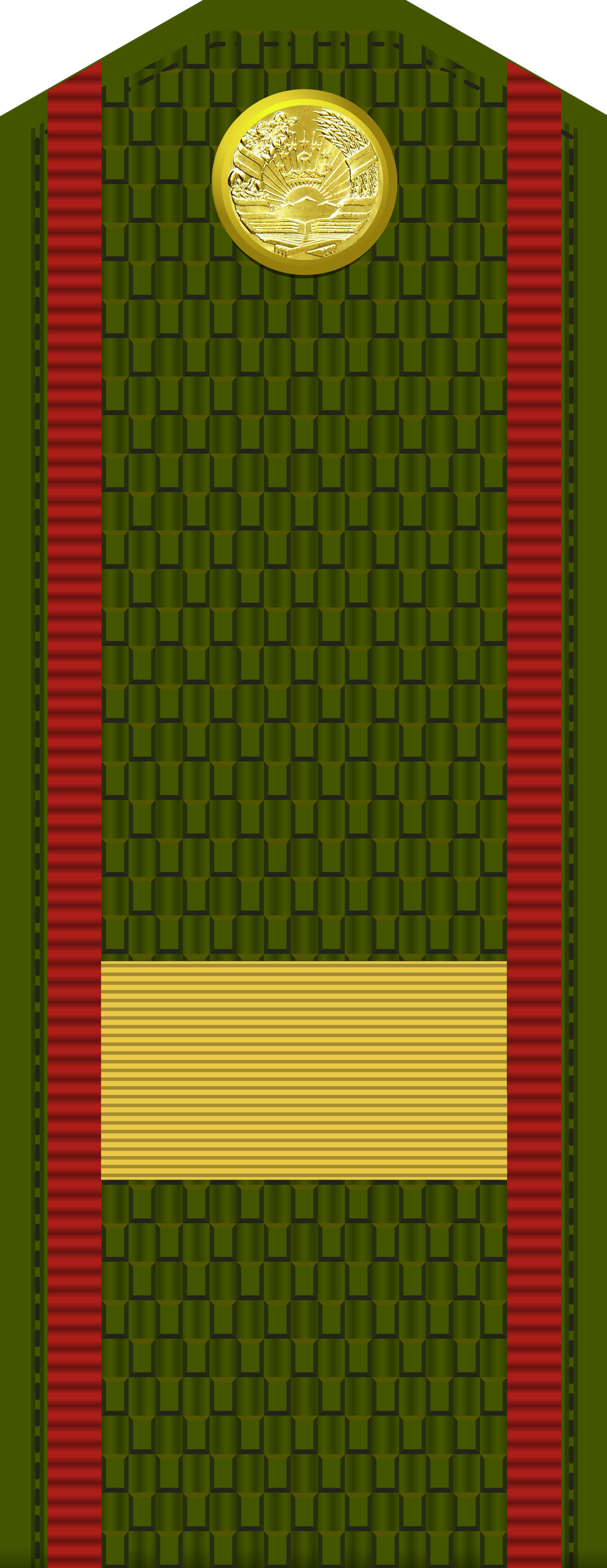
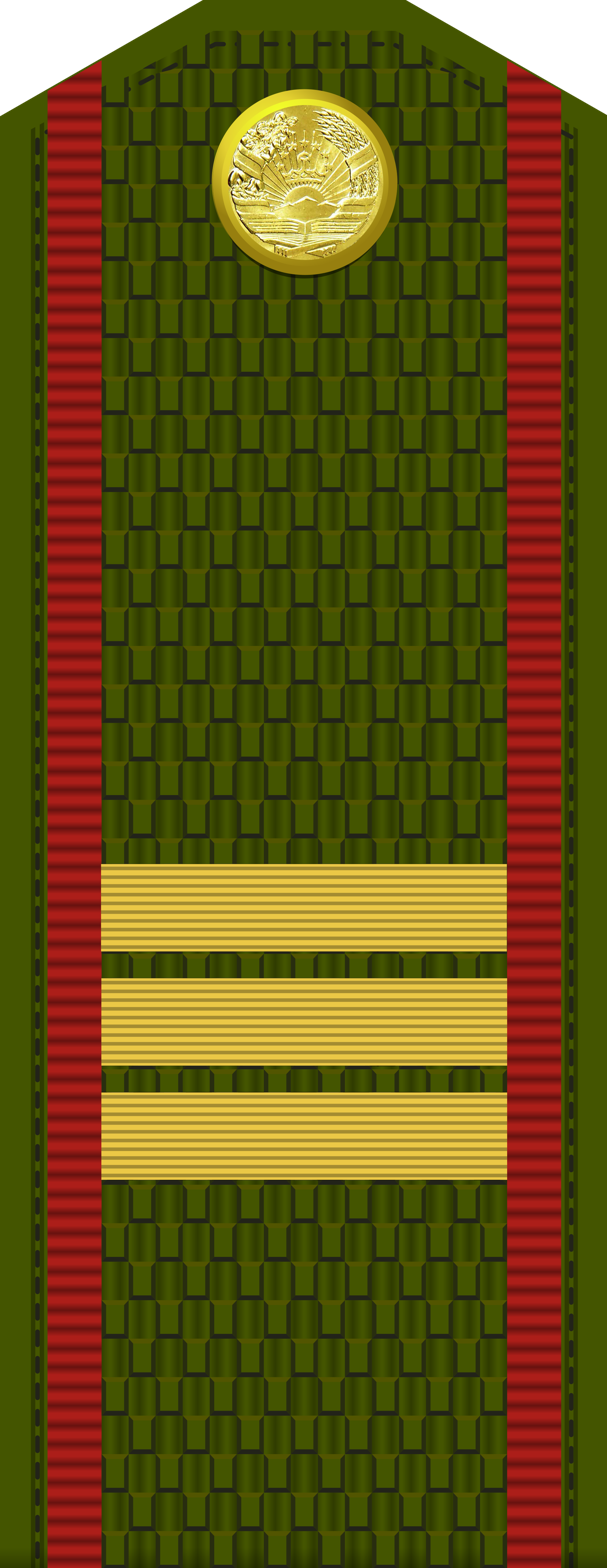
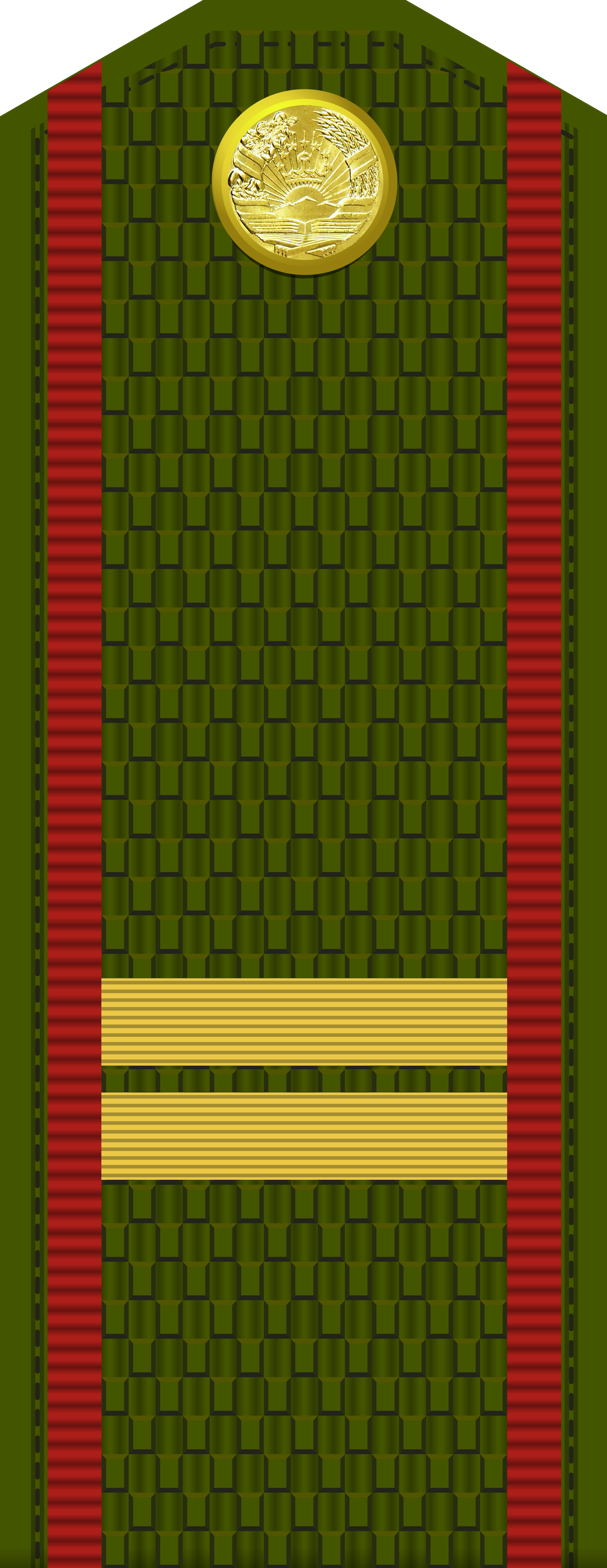
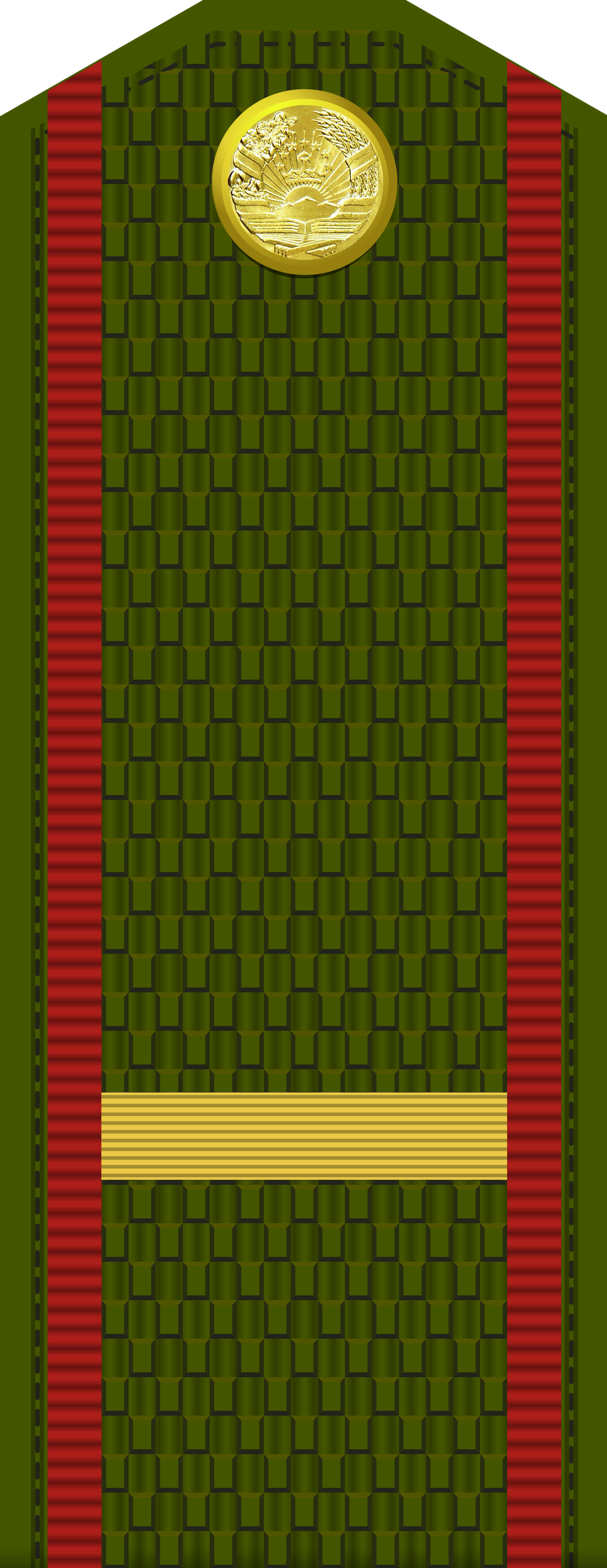
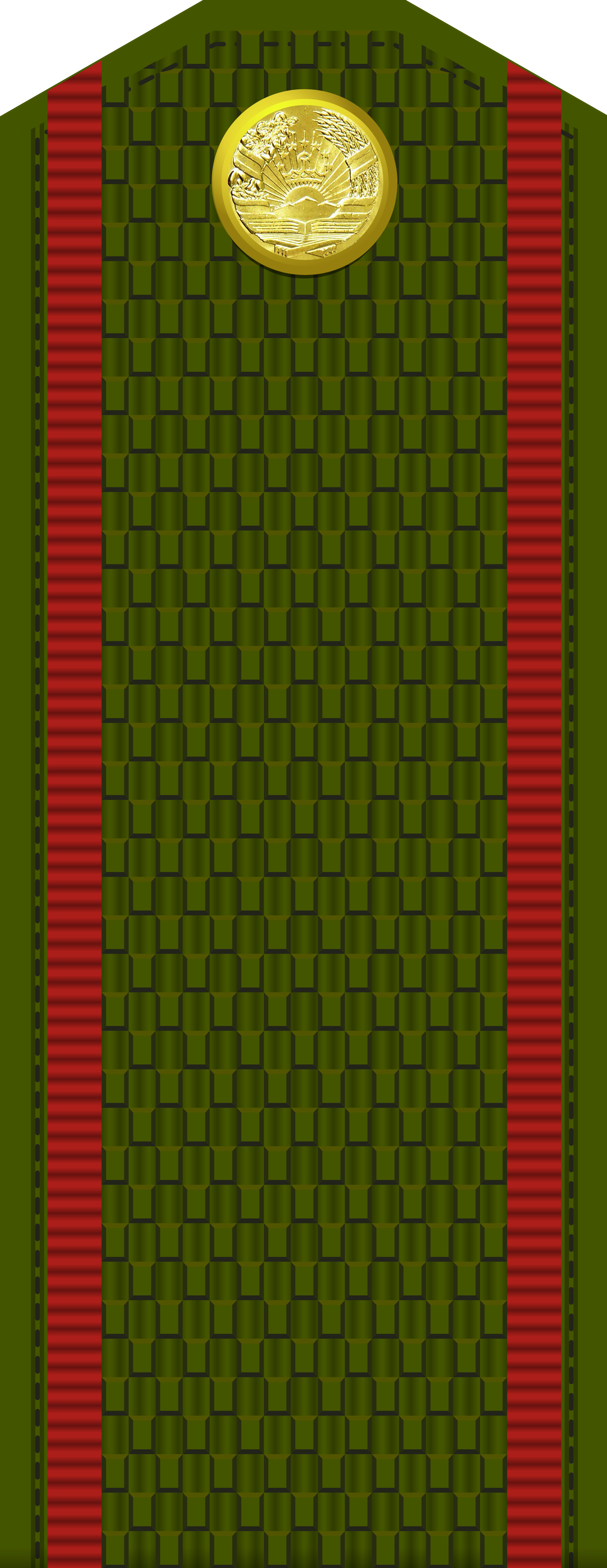
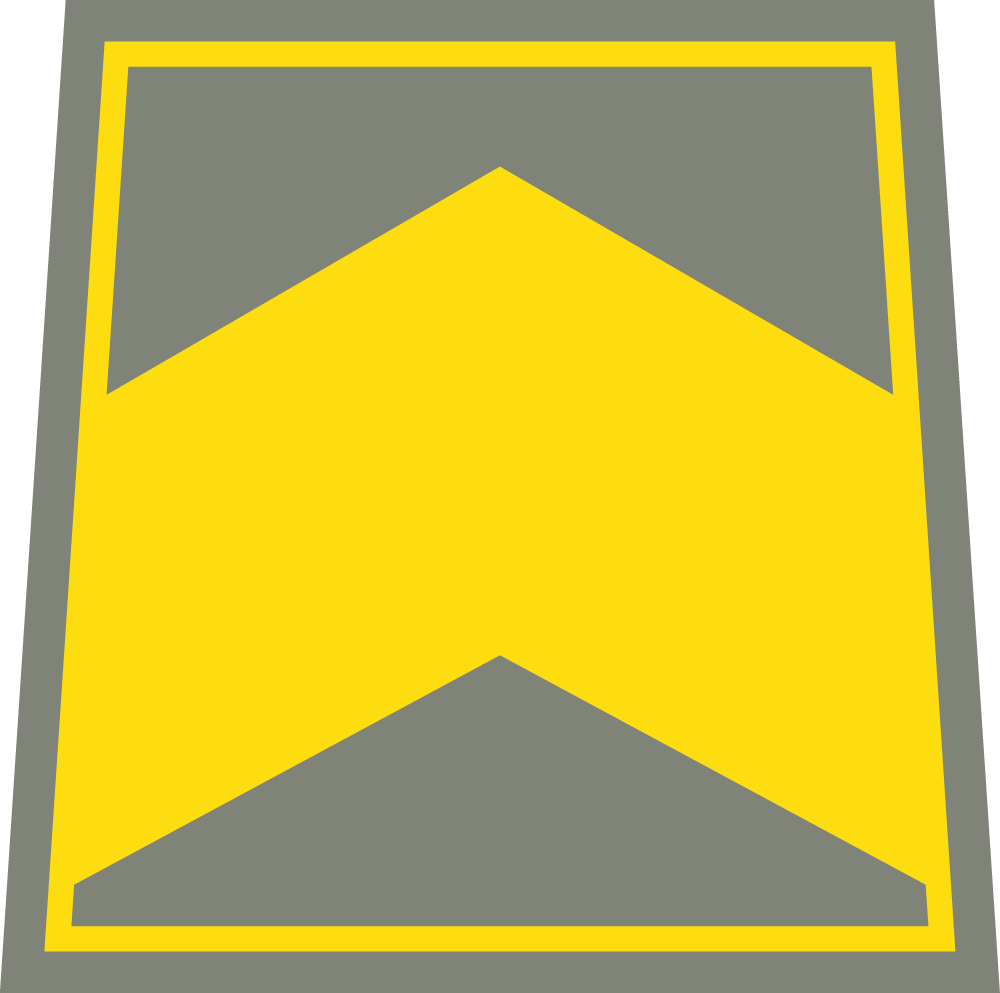
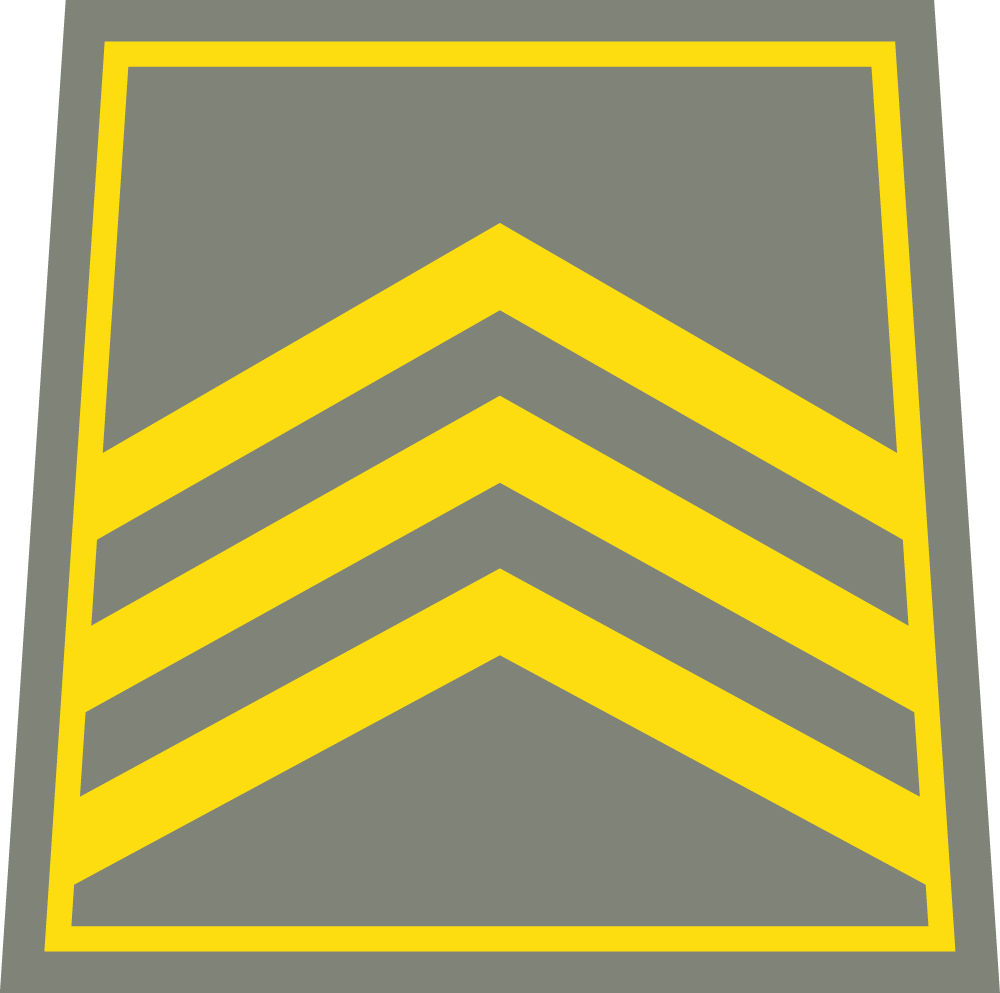
Rank group	Senior NCOs												Junior NCOs			Enlisted
Islamic National Army																		No insignia
Islamic National Army						سرپرگمشر قدمدار; Serebergemser qadamdar		معاون سرپرگمشر قدمدار; Maawan serebergemser qadamdar		سرپرگمشر; Serebergemser			معاون سرپرگمشر; Maawan sarpargamshar			پرگمشر; Pregmesher		جندي; Jondi
Armenian Ground Forces
Armenian Ground Forces	ԱՎԱԳ ԵՆԹԱՍՊԱ; Avag yent’aspa		ԵՆԹԱՍՊԱ; Yent’aspa	ԱՎԱԳ; Avag		ԱՎԱԳ ՍԵՐԺԱՆՏ; Avag serzhant		ՍԵՐԺԱՆՏ; Serzhant		ԿՐՏՍԵՐ ՍԵՐԺԱՆՏ; Krtser Serzhant			ԵՖՐԵՅՏՈՐ; Yefreytor		շարքային Shark’ayin
Azerbaijani Land Forces																No insignia
Azerbaijani Land Forces	Baş gizir		Gizir	Kiçik gizir		Baş çavuş		Çavuş		Kiçik çavuş			Baş əsgər			Əsgər
Royal Bahraini Army																		No insignia
Royal Bahraini Army						رقیب أول; Raqib 'awal				رقیب; Raqib			عريف; Earif			جندي أول; Jundiun awwal		جندي; Jundiun
Bangladesh Army
Bangladesh Army	মাস্টার ওয়ারেন্ট অফিসার; Māsṭār ōẏārēnṭ ôphisār			সিনিয়র ওয়ারেন্ট অফিসার; Siniẏar ōẏārēnṭ ôphisār		ওয়ারেন্ট অফিসার; Ōẏārēnṭ ôphisār		সার্জেন্ট; Sārjēnṭ					কর্পোর‍্যাল kôrpōrāl		ল্যান্স কর্পোর‍্যাল; Lāns kôrpōrāl			সৈনিক; Śoinik
Royal Bhutan Army																No insignia
Royal Bhutan Army	འགྲིམ་ དཔོན་ གོང མ ། Drimpongom			སྡེ་ འགྲིམ ། Dedrim		འགྲིམ་ དཔོན ། Drimpon		སྤེལ་ དཔོན ། Pelpon					སྤེལ་ རྒྱབ ། Peljab		འགོ་ པ ། Gopa
Royal Bhutan Army	Warrant officer 1st class			Warrant officer 2nd class		Warrant officer 3rd class		Sergeant					Corporal		Lance corporal	Private
Royal Brunei Land Force																No insignia
Royal Brunei Land Force	Pegawai waran 1			Pegawai waran 2		Staf sarjan		Sarjan					Koperal		Lans koperal	Prebet/Soldadu
Royal Cambodian Army
Royal Cambodian Army	ព្រឹន្ទបាលឯក; Pruentobal ek			ព្រឹន្ទបាលទោ Pruentobal tou		ពលបាលឯក; Polobal ek		ពលបាលទោ Polobal tou		ពលបាលត្រី Polobal trei			នាយឯក; Neay ek		នាយទោ Neay tou	ពលឯក; Pol ek		ពលទោ Pol tou
PLA Ground Force
PLA Ground Force	一级军士长; Yījí jūnshìzhǎng		二级军士长; Èrjí jūnshìzhǎng	三级军士长; Sānjí jūnshìzhǎng		四级军士长; Sìjí jūnshìzhǎng		上士; Shàngshì		中士; Zhōngshì			下士; Xiàshì			上等兵; Shàngděngbīng		列兵; Lièbīng
Republic of China Army
Republic of China Army	一等士官長; Yīděng shìguānzhǎng			二等士官長; Èrděng shìguānzhǎng		三等士官長; Sānděng shìguānzhǎng		上士; Shàngshì		中士; Zhōngshì			下士; Xiàshì		上等兵; Shàngděngbīng	一等兵; Yīděngbīng		二等兵; Èrděngbīng
Indian Army																No insignia
Indian Army	Subedar-major सूबेदार मेजर			Subedar सूबेदार		Naib subedar नायब सूबेदार		Havildar हवलदार					Naik नायक		Lance naik लांस नायक	Sepoy सिपाही
Rank group	Senior NCOs												Junior NCOs			Enlisted
Indonesian Army
Indonesian Army	Pembantu letnan satu		Pembantu letnan dua	Sersan mayor		Sersan kepala		Sersan satu		Sersan dua			Kopral kepala	Kopral satu	Kopral dua	Prajurit kepala	Prajurit satu	Prajurit dua
Iranian Ground Forces
Iranian Ground Forces	استوار یکم; Ostovar yekom			استوار دوم; Ostovar dovom		گروهبان یکم; Goruhban yekom		گروهبان دوم; Goruhban dovom		گروهبان سوم; Goruhban sevom			سرجوخه; Sarjukheh		سرباز یکم; Sarbaz yekom	سرباز دوم; Sarbaz dovom		سرباز; Sarbaz
Iranian Ground Forces	Chief warrant officer			Warrant officer junior grade		Sergeant first class		Sergeant second class		Sergeant third class			Corporal		Private first class	Private second class		Private
Iraqi Ground Forces
Iraqi Ground Forces	نائب دابيت; Nayib dabit					رقيب أول; Raqib 'awal		رقیب; Raqib					عريف; Earif			جندي أول; Jundiun awwal		جندي; Jundiun
Israeli Ground Forces																No insignia
Israeli Ground Forces	רב-נגד; Rav nagad		רב-סמל בכיר; Rav samal bakhír	רב-סמל מתקדם; Rav samal mitkadem	רב-סמל ראשון; Rav samal rishon	רב-סמל; Rav samal		סמל ראשון; Samal rishon		סמל; Samal			רב טוראי; Rav turai			טוראי; Turai
Japan Ground Self-Defense Force
Japan Ground Self-Defense Force	陸曹長; Rikusōchō					1等陸曹; Ittō rikusō		2等陸曹; Nitō rikusō		3等陸曹; Santō rikusō			陸士長; Rikushichō		1等陸士; Ittō rikushi	2等陸士; Nitō rikushi		自衛官候補生; Jieikan kōhosei
Royal Jordanian Army																		No insignia
Royal Jordanian Army	وكيل أول; Wakil 'awal			وكيل; Wakil		رقيب أول; Raqib 'awal		رقیب; Raqib					عريف; Earif			جندي أول; Jundiun awwal		جندي; Jundiun
Kazakh Ground Forces
Kazakh Ground Forces	Шебер-сержант; Şeber-serjant		Штаб-сержант; Ştab-serjant	Бірінші сыныпты сержант Birinşi sınıptı serjant	Екінші сыныпты сержант Ekinşi sınıptı serjant	Үшінші сыныпты сержант Üşinşi sınıptı serjant	Аға сержант Ağa serjant	Cержант; Serjant		Кіші сержант Kişi serjant			Ефрейтор; Efreĭtor		Қатардағы жауынгер Qatardağı jawınger
Korean People's Army Ground Force
Korean People's Army Ground Force	특무상사; T'ŭkmu-sangsa			상사; Sangsa		중사; Chungsa		하사; Hasa		상급병사; Sanggŭp-pyŏngsa			중급병사; Chungŭp-pyŏngsa		하급병사; Hagŭp-pyŏngsa	전사; Chŏnsa
Republic of Korea Army
Republic of Korea Army	원사; Wonsa			상사; Sangsa		중사; Jungsa		하사; Hasa		병장; Byeongjang			상등병; Sangdeungbyeong		일등병; Ildeungbyeong	이등병; Ideungbyeong
Kuwait Army																		No insignia
Kuwait Army	وكيل أول; Wakil 'awal			وكيل; Wakil		رقيب أول; Raqib 'awal		رقیب; Raqib					عريف; Earif			جندي أول; Jundiun awwal		جندي; Jundiun
Kyrgyz Army
Kyrgyz Army	Улук прапорщик Uluk praporsçik		Прапорщик; Praporsçik	Старшина; Starşina		Улук сержант Uluk serjant		Сержант; Serjant		Кенже сержант Kenje serjant			Ефрейтор; Efreytor		Катардагы жоокер Katardagı jooker
Rank group	Senior NCOs												Junior NCOs			Enlisted
Lao People's Army
Lao People's Army				ວາທີ Va thi				ສິບເອກ; Sib ek		ສິບໂທ; Sib oth			ສິບຕີ Sib ti			ຊັ້ນຫນຶ່ງ; Sannung		ຊັ້ນສອງ; Sansong
Lebanese Ground Forces																		No insignia
Lebanese Ground Forces	مؤهل أول; Muahal 'awal	مؤهل; Muahal	معاون أوّل; Maawan 'awal	معاون; Maawan				رقيب أوّل; Raqib awwl		رقيب; Raqīb			عريف أول; Earif 'awal		عريف; Earif	جندي أول; Jundiun 'awal		جندي; Jundiun
Malaysian Army																		No insignia
Malaysian Army	Pegawai waran I			Pegawai waran II		Staf sarjan		Sarjan					Koperal		Lans koperal			Prebet	Rekrut
Maldives Marine Corps																		No insignia
Maldives Marine Corps	ސާރޖަންޓް މޭޖަރ އޮފް އެމްއެންޑީއެފް Saarjant meyjar of emendeeef	ކޮމާންޑް ސާރޖަންޓް މޭޖަރ; Komaand saarjant meyjar	ސާރޖަންޓް މޭޖަރ; Saarjant meyjar	ފަސްޓް ސާރޖަންޓް Fast saarjant		ސާރޖަންޓް ފަސްޓް ކްލާސް Saarjant fast klaas		ސްޓާފް ސާރޖަންޓް Staaf saarjant		ސާރޖަންޓް Saarjant			ކޯޕްރަލް Koapral		ލާންސް ކޯޕްރަލް Laans koapral			ޕްރައިވެޓް Praivet
Mongolian Ground Force
Mongolian Ground Force	Тэргүүн ахлагч Tergüün akhlagch			Cургагч ахлагч Curgagch akhlagch		Aхлах ахлагч Akhlakh akhlagch		Aхлагч; Akhlagch		Дэд ахлагч Ded akhlagch			Ахлах түрүүч Akhlakh türüüch		Түрүүч; Türüüch	Дэд түрүүч Ded türüüch	Ахлах байлдагч Akhlakh baildagch	Байлдагч; Baildagch
Myanmar Army																		No insignia	No insignia
Myanmar Army	အရာခံဗိုလ် ’araākhaṃ bauilaʻ			ဒုတိယအရာခံဗိုလ် dautaiya ’araākhaṃ bauilaʻ		တပ်ခွဲတပ်ကြပ်ကြီး tapaʻ khavai tapaʻ karpaʻ karīʺ		တပ်ကြပ်ကြီး tapaʻ karpaʻ karīʺ					တပ်ကြပ် tapaʻ karpaʻ		ဒုတိယတပ်ကြပ် dautaiya tapaʻ karpaʻ			တပ်သား tapaʻ saāʺ	တပ်သားသစ် tapaʻ saāʺ sacaʻ
Nepali Army																No insignia		No insignia
Nepali Army	प्रमुख सुवेदार; Pramukh Suvēdār			सुवेदार; Suvēdār		जमदार; Jamadār		हुद्दा Huddā					अमल्दार; Amaldār		प्यूठ; Piyuth	सिपाही Sipahi		फलोअर्स; Phaloars
Nepali Army	Chief warrant officer			Warrant officer first class		Warrant officer second class		Sergeant					Corporal		Lance corporal	Private		Followers
Royal Army of Oman																No insignia
Royal Army of Oman	وکیل کتیبة; Wakil katiba			وکیل; Wakil		رقیب اول; Raqib 'awal		رقیب; Raqib					عریف; Earif		نائب عریف; Nayib earif	جندي; Jundiun
Pakistan Army																No insignia
Pakistan Army	Subedar-major صوبیدار میجر			Subedar صوبیدار		Naib subedar نائب صوبیدار		Havildar حوالدار					Naik نائیک		Lance naik لانس نائیک	Sepoy سپاہی
Philippine Army
Philippine Army	Chief master sergeant		Senior master sergeant	Master sergeant		Technical sergeant		Staff sergeant		Sergeant			Corporal			Private first class		Private
Qatari Emiri Land Force																No insignia
Qatari Emiri Land Force	وكيل اول; Wakil awwal			وكيل ثاني; Wakil thani		رقيب; Raqib		نائب; Nayib					عريف; Earif		وكيل عريف; Wakil earif	جندي; Jundi
Russian Ground Forces
Russian Ground Forces	Ста́рший пра́порщик Stárshiy práporshchik		Пра́порщик; Práporshchyk	Старшина́ Starshyná		Ста́рший сержа́нт Stárshiy serzhánt		Сержа́нт; Serzhánt		Мла́дший сержа́нт Mládshiy serzhánt			Ефре́йтор; Efréĭtor		Рядово́й; Ryadovóy
Rank group	Senior NCOs												Junior NCOs			Enlisted
Saudi Arabian Army																		No insignia
Saudi Arabian Army	رئيس رقباء; Rayiys ruqaba'			رقيب أول; Raqib 'awal		رقيب; Raqib		وكيل رقيب; Wakil raqib					عريف; Earif			جندي أول; Jundiun awwal		جندي; Jundiun
Singapore Army																		No insignia	No insignia
Singapore Army	Master sergeant			Staff sergeant		First sergeant		Second sergeant		Third sergeant			Corporal first class	Corporal	Lance corporal	Private first class		Private	Recruit
Sri Lanka Army																No insignia
Sri Lanka Army	Warrant officer class I			Warrant officer class II		Staff sergeant (Note: For artillery personnel at this rank, the emblem is replaced by towed artillery gun. For engineering personnel at this rank, the emblem is replaced by a bursting grenade.)		Sergeant					Corporal/ Bombardier		Lance corporal/ Lance bombardier	Private (or equivalent)
Syrian Army																		No insignia
Syrian Army	مساعد أول; Musaeid 'awal		مساعد ثاني; Musaeid thani	مساعد; Musaeid		رقيب أول; Raqib 'awal		رقيب ثاني; Raqib thani		رقيب; Raqib			عريف; Earif			جندي أول; Jundiun 'awal		جندي; Jundiun
Tajik Ground Forces
Tajik Ground Forces	Прапоршики калон Praporshiki kalon		Прапоршик; Praporshik	Старшина; Starshyna		Сержанти калон Serzhanti kalon		Сержант; Serzhant		Сержанти хурд Serzhanti xurd			Ефрейтор; Efreytor		Қаторӣ; Qatorī
Royal Thai Army																		No insignia
Royal Thai Army	จ่าสิบเอก; Cha sip ek			จ่าสิบโท; Cha sip tho		จ่าสิบตรี Cha sip tri				สิบเอก; Sip ek			สิบโท; Sip tho		สิบตรี Sip tri			พลทหาร; Phon thahan
Timor-Leste Army
Timor-Leste Army	Sargento-mor			Sargento-chefe		Sargento-ajudante		Primeiro-sargento		Segundo-sargento	Furriel	Segundo-furriel			Cabo-adjunto	Primeiro-cabo	Segundo-cabo	Soldado
Turkmen Ground Forces
Turkmen Ground Forces				Starşina		Uly seržant		Seržant		Kiçi seržant					Hatarçy
United Arab Emirates Army																		No insignia
United Arab Emirates Army				مساعد أول; Musa'id 'awal		مساعد; Musa'id				رقیب; Raqib			عريف; Earif			جندي أول; Jundi awwal		جندي; Jundi
Uzbek Ground Forces
Uzbek Ground Forces						Katta serjant		I darajali serjant	II darajali serjant	III darajali serjant		Kichik serjant			Oddiy askar
Vietnam People's Ground Force
Vietnam People's Ground Force				Thượng sĩ				Trung sĩ					Hạ sĩ			Binh nhất		Binh nhì
Yemeni Land Forces
Yemeni Land Forces	مساعد أول; Musaeid 'awal		مساعد ثان; Musaeid than	مساعد; Musaeid		رقيب أول; Raqib 'awal		رقيب; Raqib					عريف; Earif			جندي; Jundiun
Rank group	Senior NCOs												Junior NCOs			Enlisted

== See also ==
- Comparative army enlisted ranks of the Americas
- Ranks and insignia of NATO armies enlisted
- Comparative military ranks of Korea
