= Comparative army enlisted ranks of the European Union =

Rank comparison chart of non-commissioned officers (NCOs) and enlisted personnel for all armies and land forces of the European Union member states.

== NCO and enlisted ranks ==
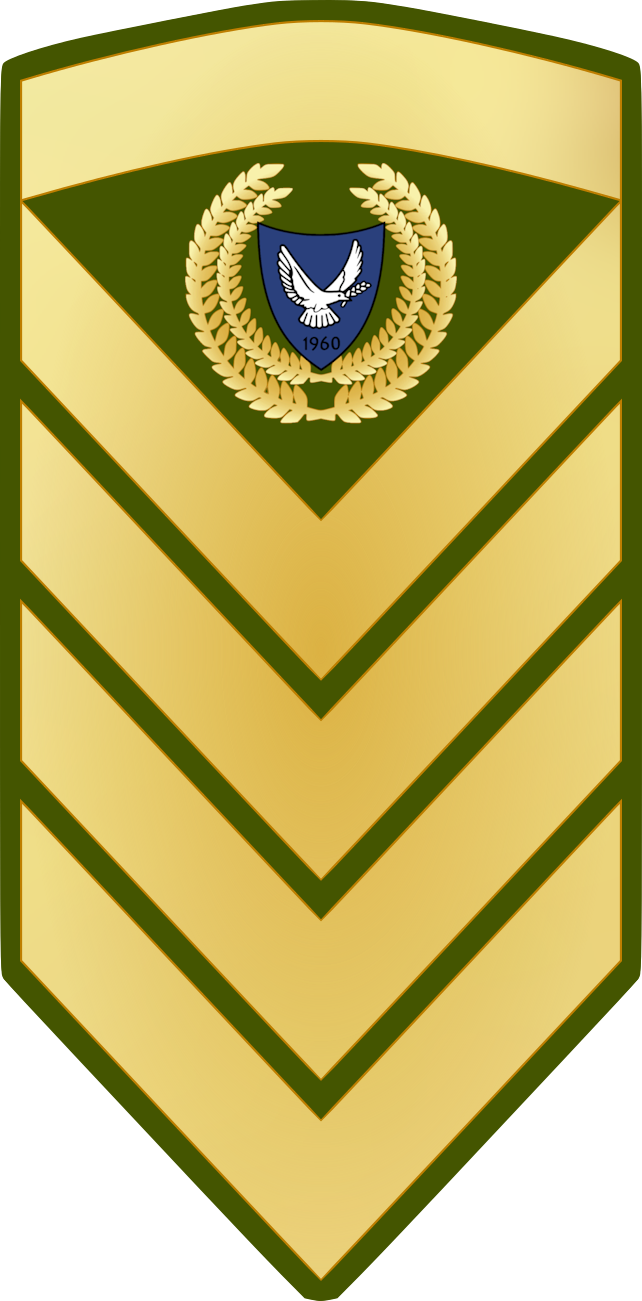
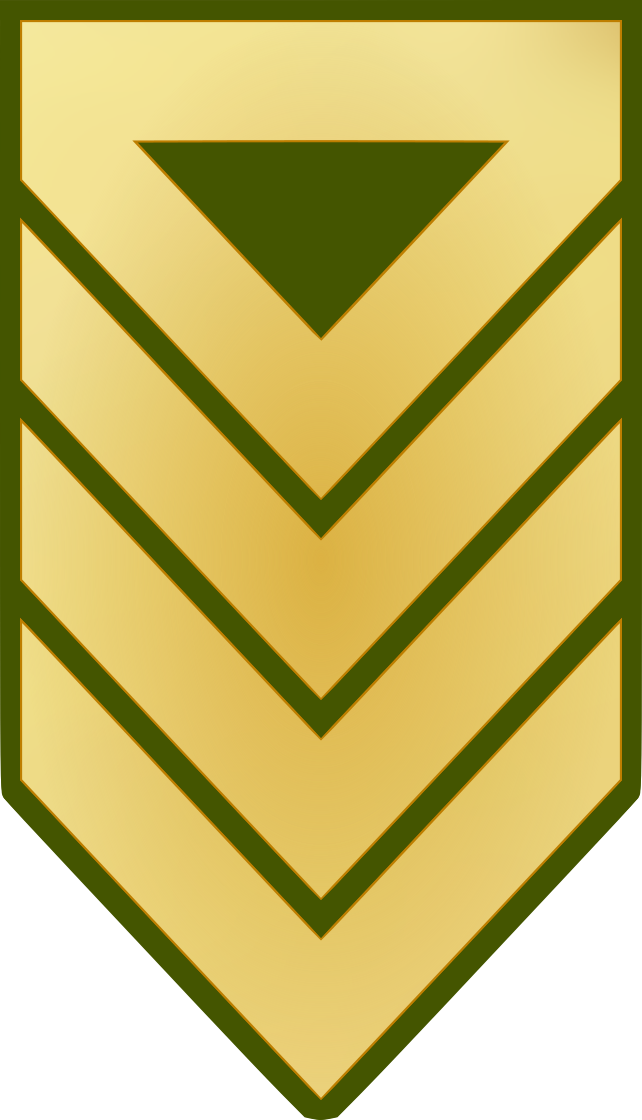
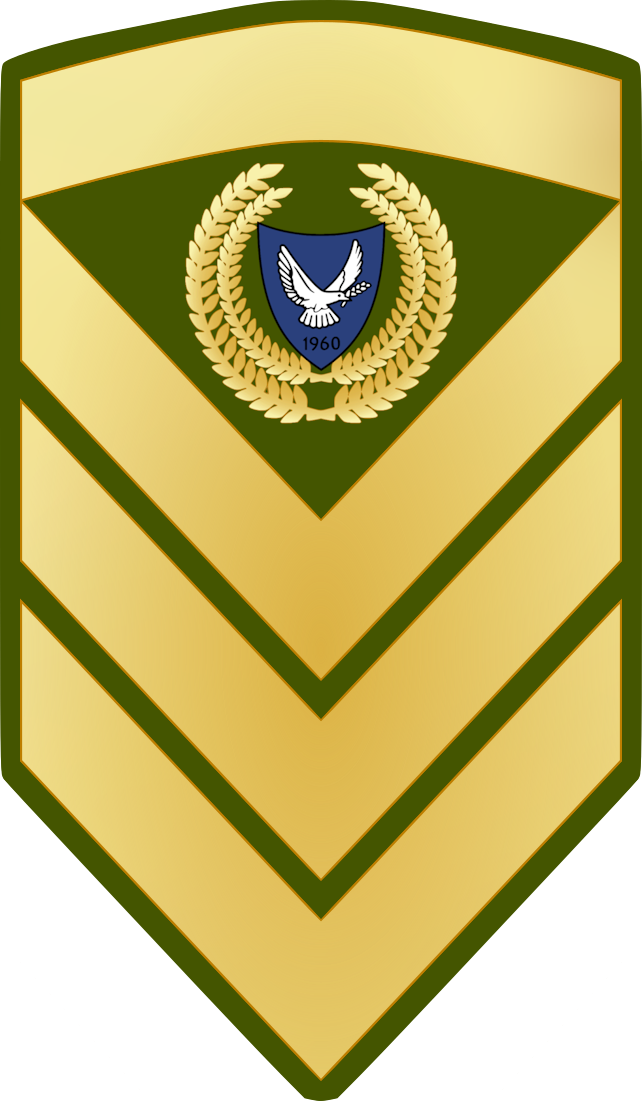
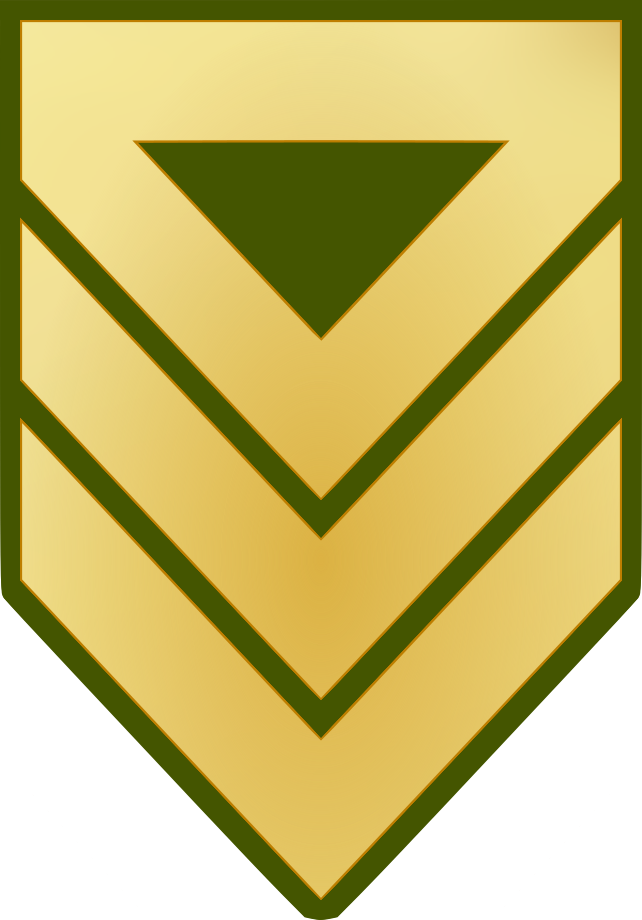
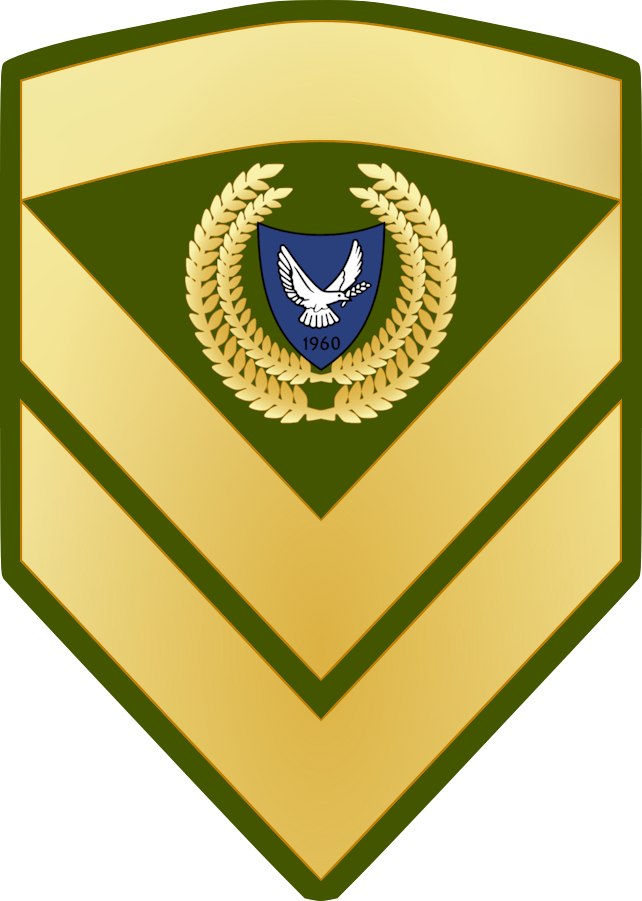
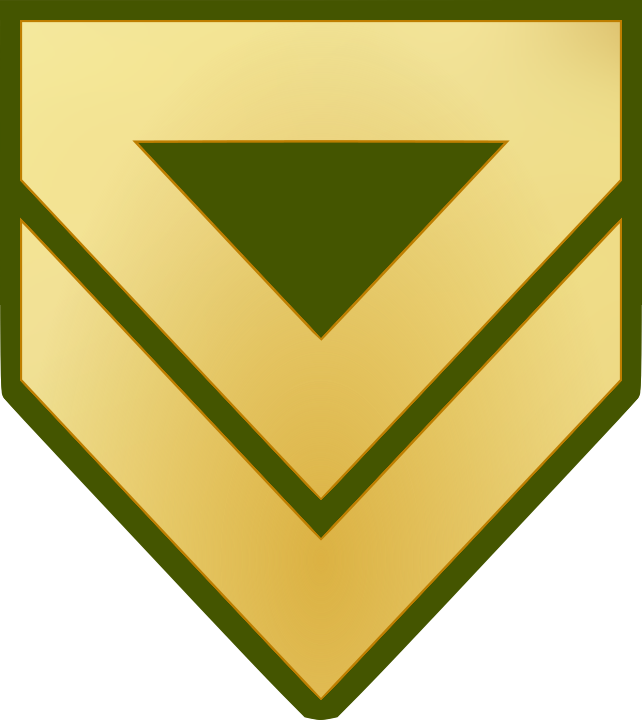
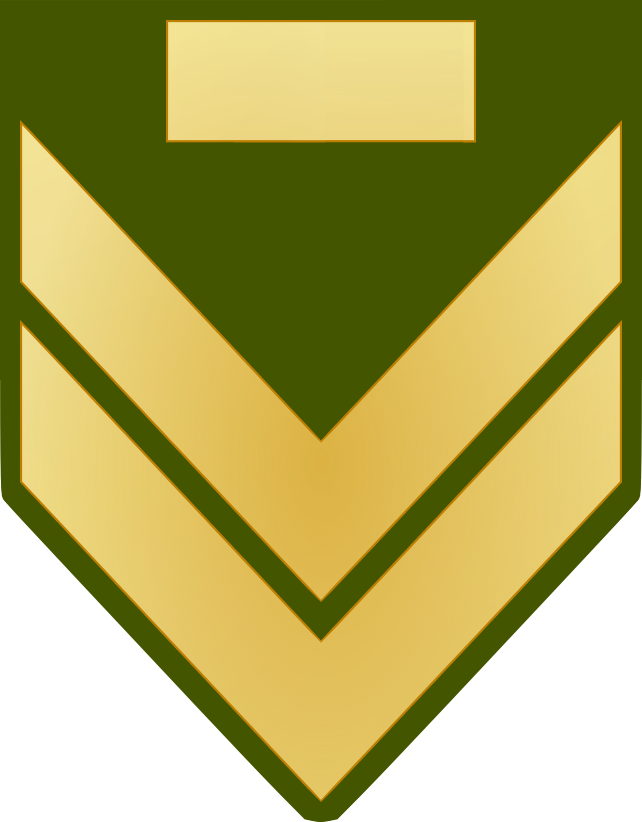
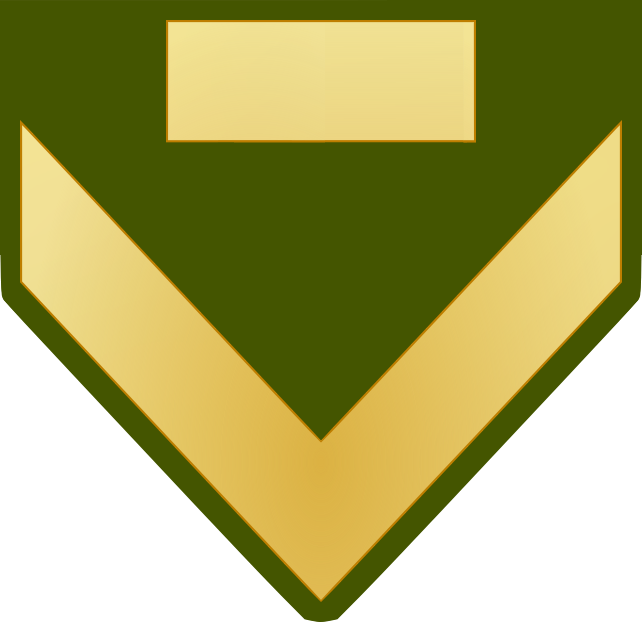
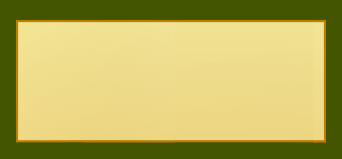
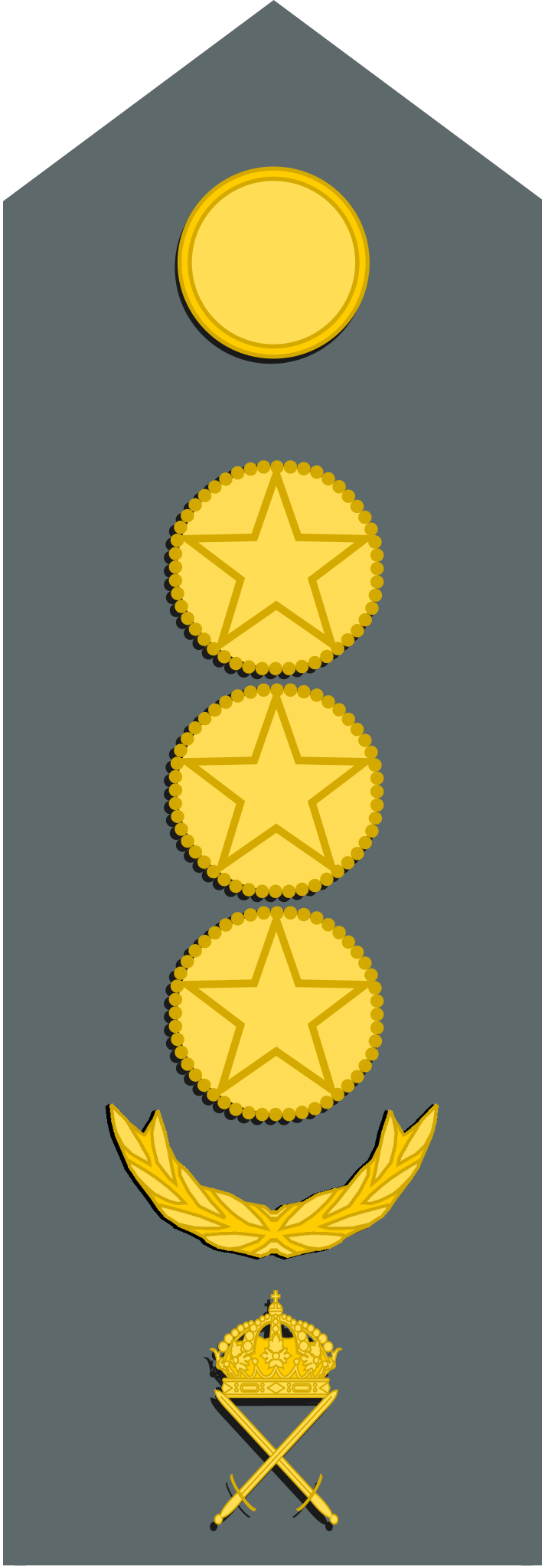
| Rank group | Senior NCOs | | | | | | | | | | | Junior NCOs | | | | | | Enlisted |
|---|---|---|---|---|---|---|---|---|---|---|---|---|---|---|---|---|---|---|---|---|---|---|---|
| Austrian Land Forces |
| Austrian Land Forces | Vizeleutnant | | Offiziersstellvertreter | Oberstabswachtmeister | | Stabswachtmeister | | Oberwachtmeister | | Wachtmeister | | Zugsführer | | | | Korporal | | Gefreiter | | | | Rekrut |
| Belgian Land Component |
| Belgian Land Component | Adjudant-majoor | | Adjudant-chef | Adjudant | | 1ste sergeant-majoor | | 1ste sergeant-chef | 1ste sergeant | Sergeant | | 1ste korporaal-chef | | Korporaal-chef | | Korporaal | | 1ste soldaat | | | | Soldaat |
| Belgian Land Component | Adjudant-major | | Adjudant-chef | Adjudant | | Premier sergent-major | | Premier sergent-chef | Premier sergent | Sergent | | Premier caporal-chef | | Caporal-chef | | Caporal | | Premier soldat | | | | Soldat |
| Belgian Land Component | Majoradjutant | | Chefadjudant | Adjudant | | 1er Sergeant major | | 1er Sergeant chef | 1er Sergeant | Sergeant | | 1er Korporal chef | | Korporal chef | | Korporal | | 1er soldat | | | | Soldat |
| Bulgarian Land Forces |
| Bulgarian Land Forces | Офицерски кандидат Ofitserski kandidat | | | Старшина; Starshyna | | Старши сержант Starshi serzhant | | Сержант; Serzhant | | Младши сержант Mladshi serzhant | | Ефрейтор; Efreytor | | | | Редник; Rednik |
| Croatian Army | | | | | | | | | | | | | | | | | | | | | | No insignia |
| Croatian Army | Časnički namjesnik | | | Stožerni narednik | | Nadnarednik | | Narednik | | Desetnik | | Skupnik | | | | Razvodnik | | Pozornik | | | | Vojnik |
| Cypriot Ground Forces | | | | | | | | | | | | | | | | | | | | | | Arm/corps insignia only |
| Cypriot Ground Forces | Ανθυπασπιστής; Anthypaspistís | | | Αρχιλοχίας; Archilochías | | Επιλοχίας; Epilochías | | Λοχίας; Lochías | | | | Δεκανέας; Dekanéas | | | | Υποδεκανέας; Ypodekanéas | | | | | | Στρατιώτης; Stratiótis |
| Czech Land Forces |
| Czech Land Forces | Štábní praporčík | | | Nadpraporčík | | Praporčík | | Nadrotmistr | | Rotmistr | | Rotný | | | | Četař | | Desátník | | | | Svobodník | Vojín |
| Royal Danish Army |
| Royal Danish Army | Chefsergent | | | Seniorsergent | | Oversergent | | | | Sergent | Sergent (Officerselev) | Korporal | | | | Overkonstabel af 1. grad | | Overkonstabel | | | | Konstabel |
| Estonian Land Forces |
| Estonian Land Forces | Ülemveebel | | Staabiveebel | Vanemveebel | | Veebel | | Nooremveebel | | Vanemseersant | | Seersant | | Nooremseersant | | | | Kapral | | | | Reamees |
| Finnish Army |
| Finnish Army | Sotilasmestari | | | Ylivääpeli | | Vääpeli | | Ylikersantti | | Kersantti | | Alikersantti | | | | Korpraali | | Sotamies |
| Finnish Army | Militärmästare | | | Överfältväbel | | Fältväbel | | Översergeant | | Sergeant | | Undersergeant | | | | Korpral | | Soldat |
| Rank group | Senior NCOs | | | | | | | | | | | Junior NCOs | | | | | | Enlisted |
| French Army |
| French Army | Major | | Adjudant-chef | Adjudant | | Sergent-chef BM2/ Maréchal-des-logis-chef de 1^{ere} classe | | Sergent-chef/ Maréchal-des-logis-chef | | Sergent/ Maréchal-des-logis | | Caporal-chef de 1^{re} classe | | Caporal-chef/ Brigadier-chef | | Caporal/ Brigadier | | Soldat de 1^{re} classe | | | | Soldat |
| German Army |
| German Army | Oberstabsfeldwebel | | | Stabsfeldwebel | | Hauptfeldwebel | | Oberfeldwebel | Feldwebel | Stabsunteroffizier | Unteroffizier | Stabskorporal | Korporal | Oberstabsgefreiter | Stabsgefreiter | Hauptgefreiter | Obergefreiter | Gefreiter | | | | Soldat |
| German Army (Officer designate) |
| German Army (Officer designate) | | | | | | Oberfähnrich | | Fähnrich | | Fahnenjunker |
| Hellenic Army | | | | | | | | | | | | | | | | | | | | | | Arm/corps insignia only |
| Hellenic Army | Ανθυπασπιστής (Note: Greece has only one level of Warrant Officer. According to the current issue (2021) of STANAG 2116, the Greek Warrant Officers are included in OR-9, however they are afforded the privileges of an officer. See STANAG 2116 note 29, page D-9); Anthypaspistis | | | Αρχιλοχίας; Archilochias | | Επιλοχίας; Epilochias | | Λοχίας; Lochias | | | | Δεκανέας; Dekaneas | | | | Υποδεκανέας; Ypodekaneas | | | | | | Στρατιώτης; Stratiotis |
| Hungarian Ground Forces |
| Hungarian Ground Forces | Főtörzszászlós | | | Törzszászlós | Zászlós | Főtörzsőrmester | | Törzsőrmester | | Őrmester | | Szakaszvezető | | | | Tizedes | | Őrvezető | | | | Közkatona |
| Irish Army | | | | | | | | | | | | | | | | | | | | | | No insignia |
| Irish Army | Sergeant major | | | Regimental Quartermaster Sergeant | | Company sergeant | | Company quartermaster sergeant | | Sergeant | | Corporal | | | | Private, 3 star | | Private, 2 star | | | | Recruit |
| Irish Army | Maor-Sáirsint Cathláin/Reisimint (Note: Battalion (Cathlán), Regiment (Reisimint)) | | | Ceathrúsháirsint Cathláin/Reisimint | | Sáirsint Complachta (Note: Battery (Ceallraí) in the Artillery. Squadron (Scuadrún) in the Cavalry.) | | Ceathrúsháirsint Complachta | | Sáirsint | | Ceannaire | | | | Saighdiúr Singil, 3 Réalta | | Saighdiúr Singil, 2 Réalta | | | | Earcach |
| Italian Army | | | | Maresciallo capo / Maresciallo ordinario / Maresciallo | | | | | | | | Gradutato aiutante / Primo graduato / Graduato capo / Graduato scelto / Graduato |
| Italian Army | Primo luogotenente | Luogotenente | Primo maresciallo | Maresciallo capo / Maresciallo ordinario / Maresciallo | | Sergente maggiore aiutante | Sergente maggiore capo | Sergente maggiore | | Sergente | | Gradutato aiutante / Primo graduato / Graduato capo / Graduato scelto / Graduato | | | | Caporal maggiore | | Caporale | | | | Soldato |
| Latvian Land Forces |
| Latvian Land Forces | Augstākais virsseržants | | | Galvenais virsseržants | | Štāba virsseržants | | Virsseržants | | Seržants | | Kaprālis | | | | Dižkareivis | | Kareivis |
| Lithuanian Land Force |
| Lithuanian Land Force | Seržantas majoras | | | Viršila | | Štabo seržantas | | Vyresnysis seržantas | | Seržantas | | Grandinis | | | | Vyresnysis eilinis | | Eilinis | | | | Jaunesnysis eilinis |
| Luxembourg Army |
| Luxembourg Army | Adjudant-major | | Adjudant-chef | Adjudant | | Sergent-chef | | Premier sergent | | Sergent | | Premier caporal-chef | | Caporal-chef | | Caporal de première classe | Caporal | Premier soldat-chef | | Soldat-chef | | Soldat de première classe | Soldat |
| Rank group | Senior NCOs | | | | | | | | | | | Junior NCOs | | | | | | Enlisted |
| Army of Malta | | | | | | | | | | | | | | | | | | No insignia |
| Army of Malta | Warrant officer class 1 | | | Warrant officer class 2 | | Staff sergeant | | Sergeant | | | | Bombardier | | | | Lance bombardier | | Gunner (or equivalent) |
| Royal Netherlands Army |
| Royal Netherlands Army | Adjudant-onderofficier | | | | | Sergeant-majoor/ Opperwachtmeester | | Sergeant der 1e klasse/ Wachtmeester der 1e klasse | | Sergeant/ Wachtmeester | | Korporaal der 1e klasse | | | | Korporaal | | Soldaat/ Huzaar/ Kanonier der 1e klasse | | Soldaat/ Huzaar/ Kanonier der 2e klasse | | Soldaat/ Huzaar/ Kanonier der 3e klasse |
| Polish Land Forces |
| Polish Land Forces | Starszy chorąży sztabowy | | Starszy chorąży | Chorąży | | | | Młodszy chorąży | | Starszy sierżant | | Sierżant | | | | Plutonowy | Starszy kapral | Kapral | | | | Starszy szeregowy | Szeregowy |
| Portuguese Army |
| Portuguese Army | Sargento-mor | | Sargento-chefe | Sargento-ajudante | | Primeiro-sargento | | Segundo-sargento | | Furriel | Segundo-furriel | Cabo de secção | | | | Cabo-adjunto | | Primeiro-cabo | | Segundo-cabo | | Soldado |
| Romanian Land Forces |
| Romanian Land Forces | Plutonier adjutant principal | | Plutonier adjutant | Plutonier-major | | Plutonier | | Sergent-major | | Sergent | | Caporal clasa I | Caporal clasa a II-a | Caporal clasa a III-a | | Fruntaș | | Soldat |
| Slovak Ground Forces |
| Slovak Ground Forces | Štábny nadrotmajster | | | Nadrotmajster | | Rotmajster | | Rotný | | Čatár | | Desiatnik | | | | Slobodník | | Vojak 2. stupňa | | | | Vojak 1. stupňa |
| Slovenian Ground Force |
| Slovenian Ground Force | Višji štabni praporščak | Štabni praporščak | Višji praporščak | Praporščak | Višji štabni vodnik | Štabni vodnik | | Višji vodnik | | Vodnik | | Naddesetnik | | | | Desetnik | | Poddesetnik | | | | Vojak |
| Spanish Army |
| Spanish Army | Suboficial mayor | | Subteniente | Brigada | | Sargento primero | | Sargento | | Cabo mayor | | Cabo primero | | | | Cabo | | Soldado de primera | | | | Soldado |
| Swedish Army |
| Swedish Army | Regementsförvaltare | | | Förvaltare | | Överfanjunkare | Fanjunkare | Översergeant | Sergeant | Överfurir | Furir | Korpral | | | | Vicekorpral | | Menig 4 | Menig 3 | Menig 2 | Menig 1 | Menig |
| Rank group | Senior NCOs | | | | | | | | | | | Junior NCOs | | | | | | Enlisted |

== See also ==
- Comparative army officer ranks of the European Union
- Military rank
- Comparative navy officer ranks of the European Union
- Comparative navy enlisted ranks of the European Union
- Comparative air force officer ranks of the European Union
- Comparative air force enlisted ranks of the European Union
- Ranks and insignia of NATO armies enlisted
- Comparative army enlisted ranks of Europe
