= Comparative air force enlisted ranks of the European Union =

Rank comparison chart of air forces non-commissioned officers and other personnel of the European Union member states.

== Other ranks ==
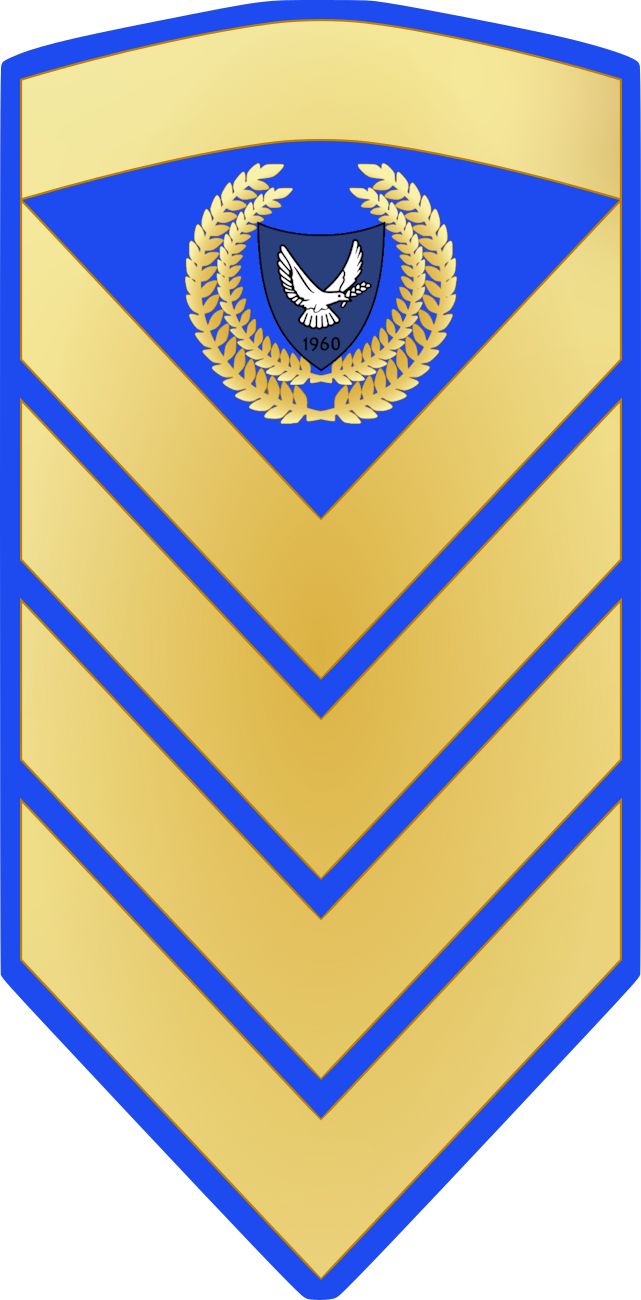
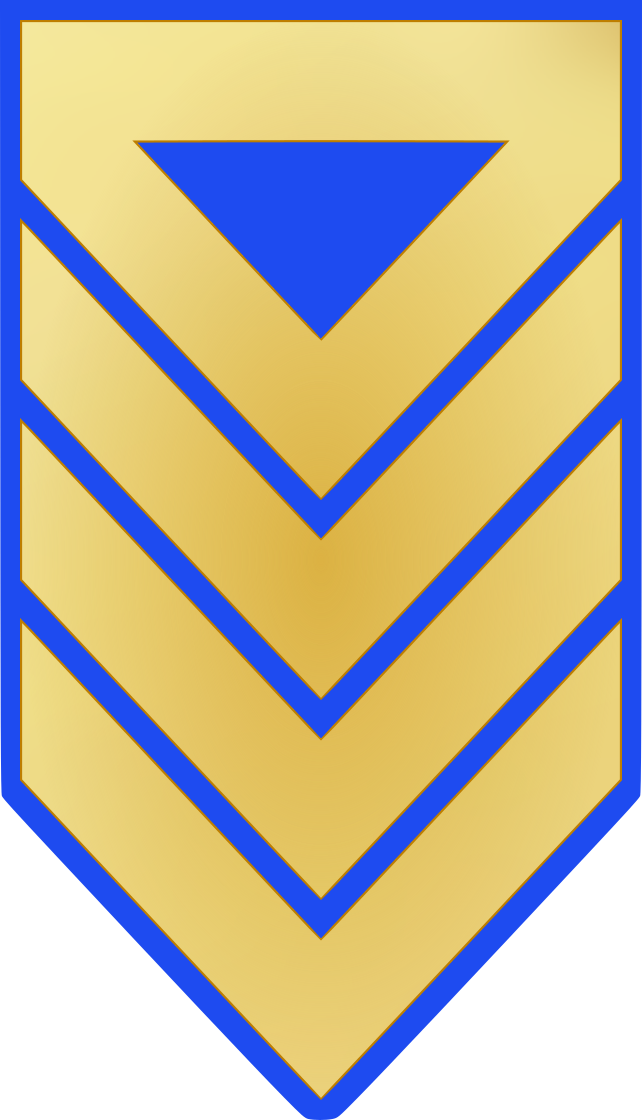
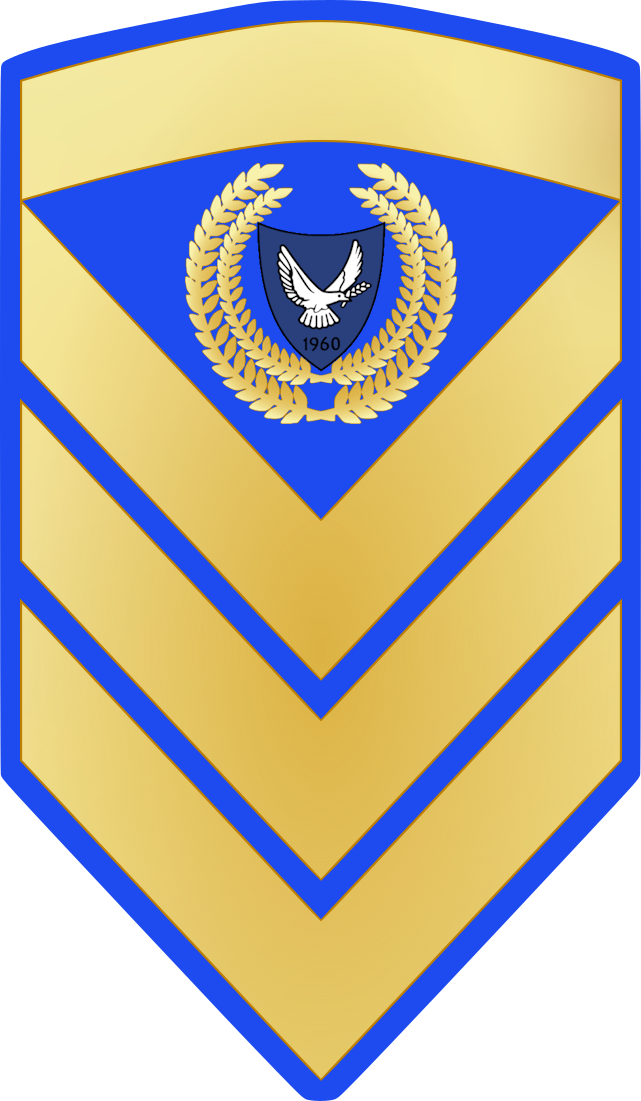
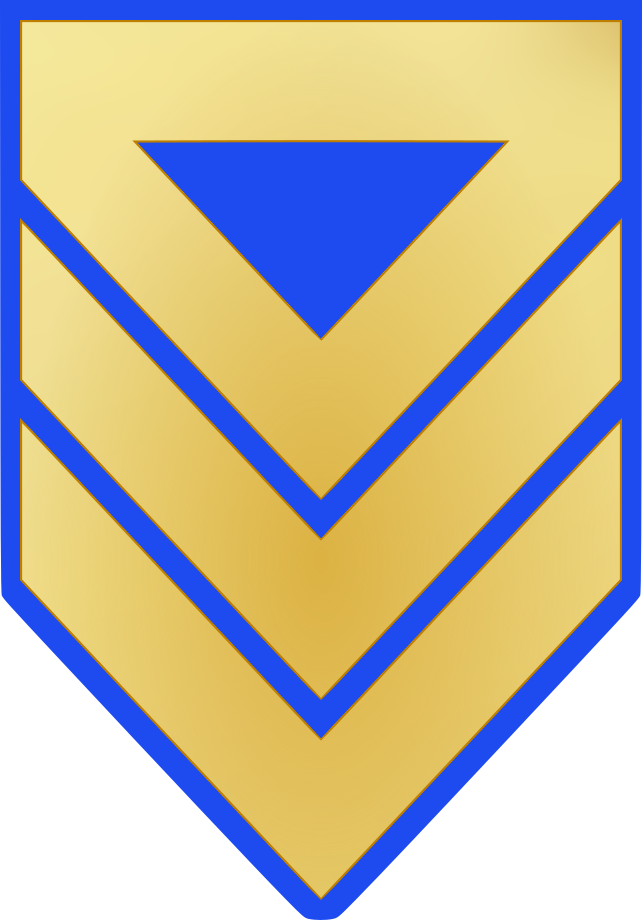
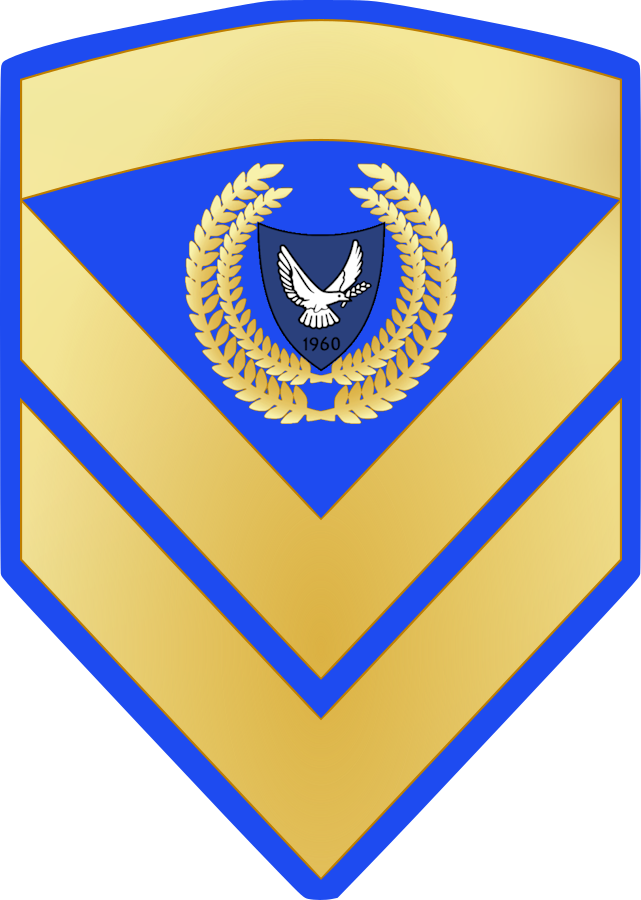
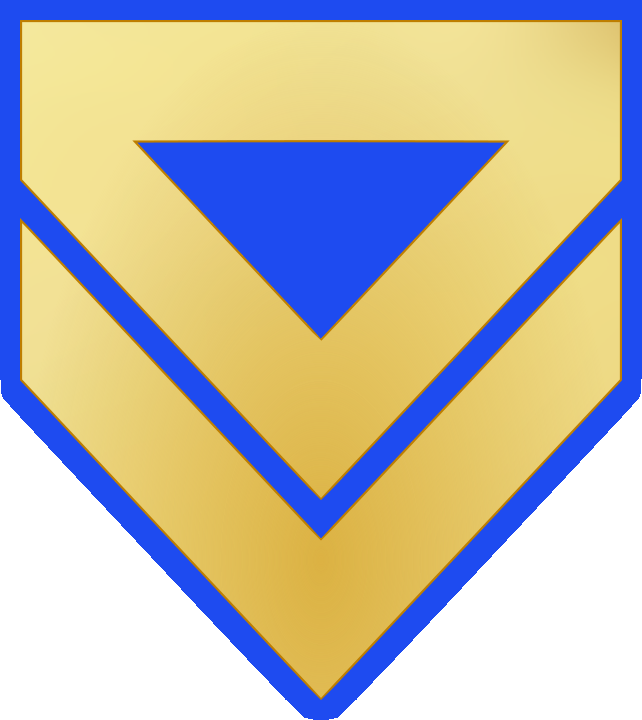
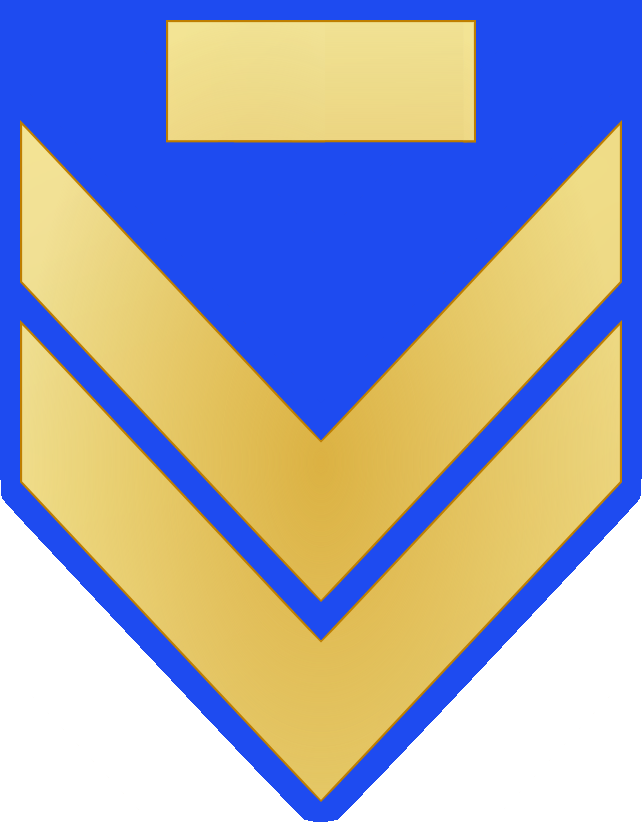
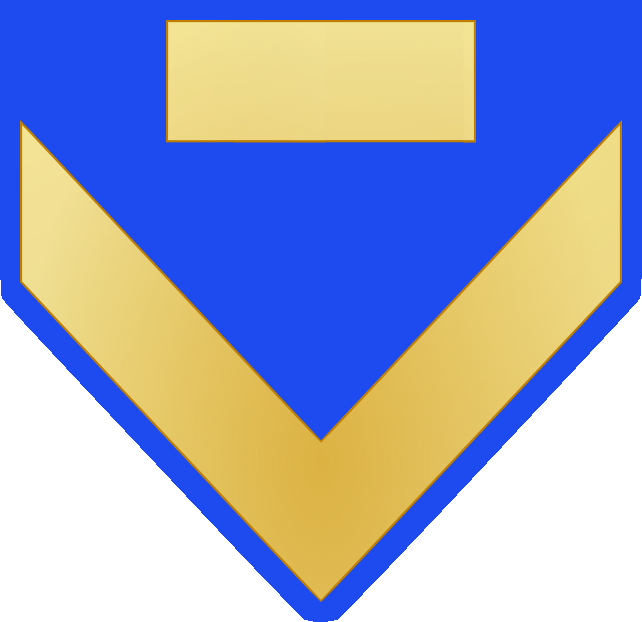
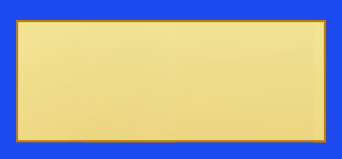
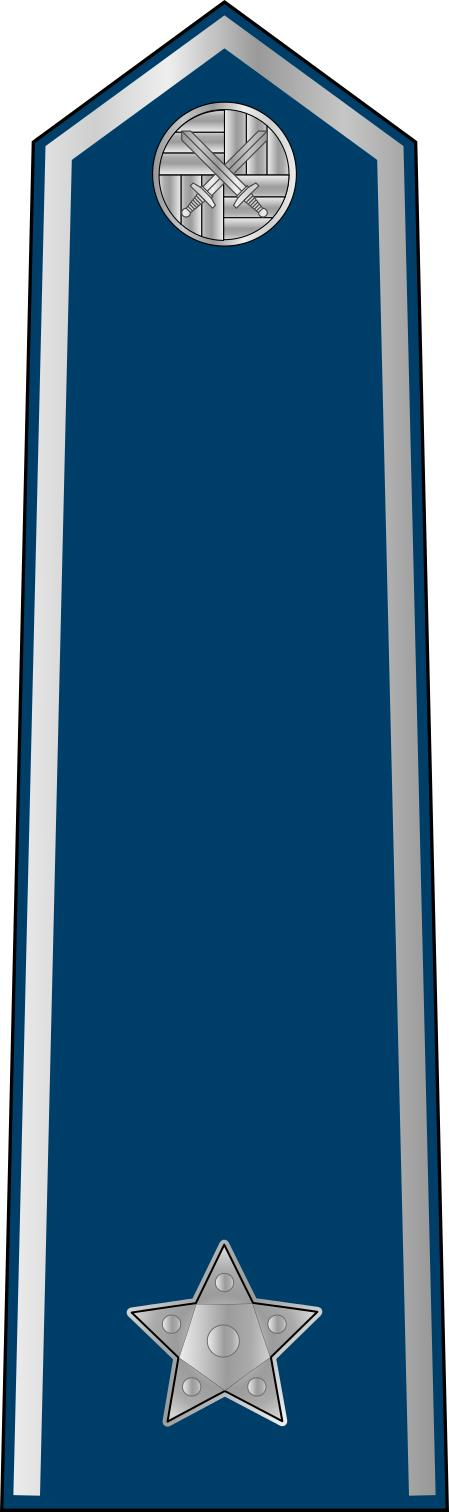
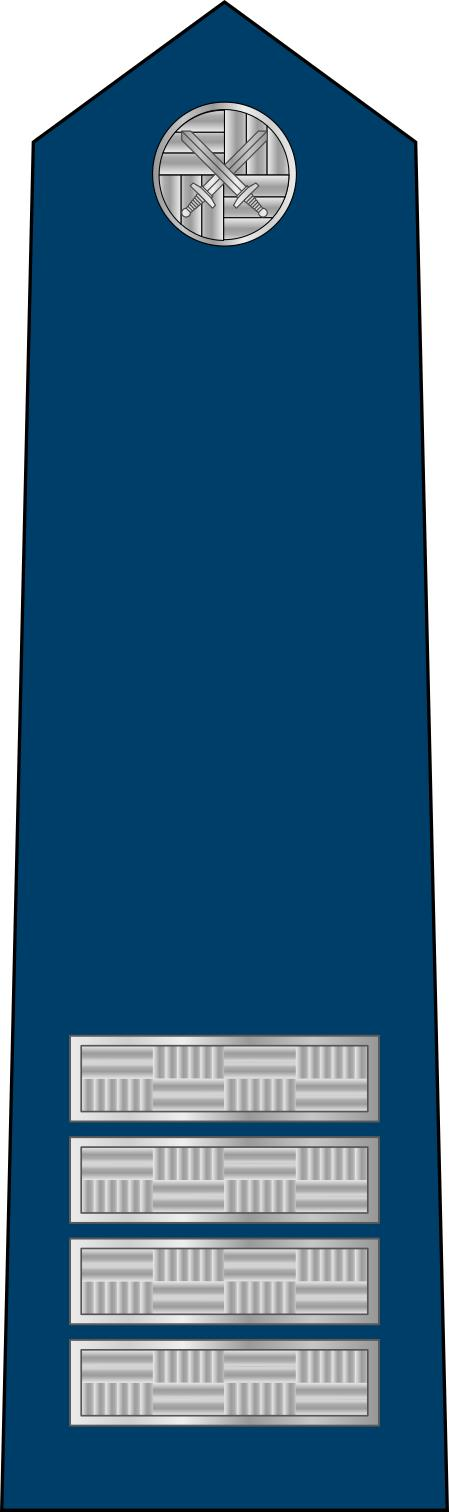
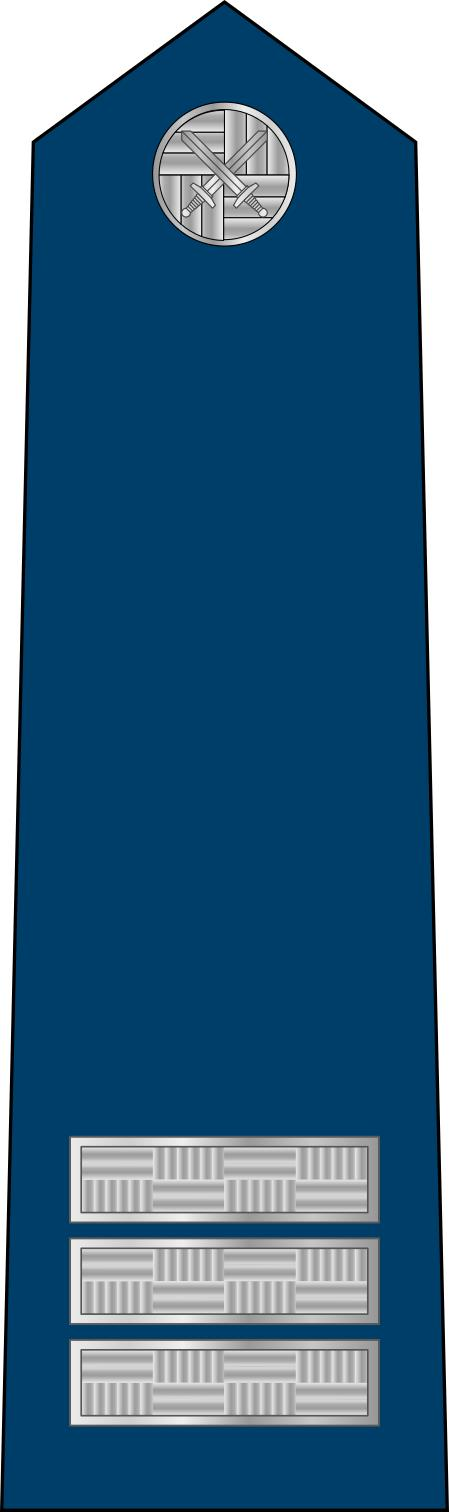
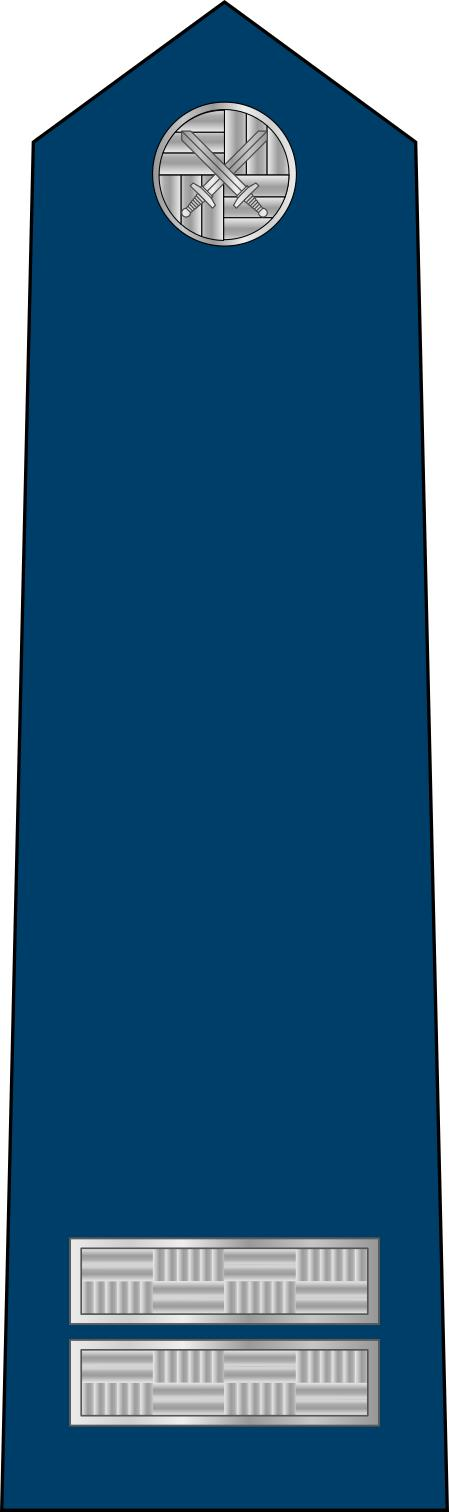
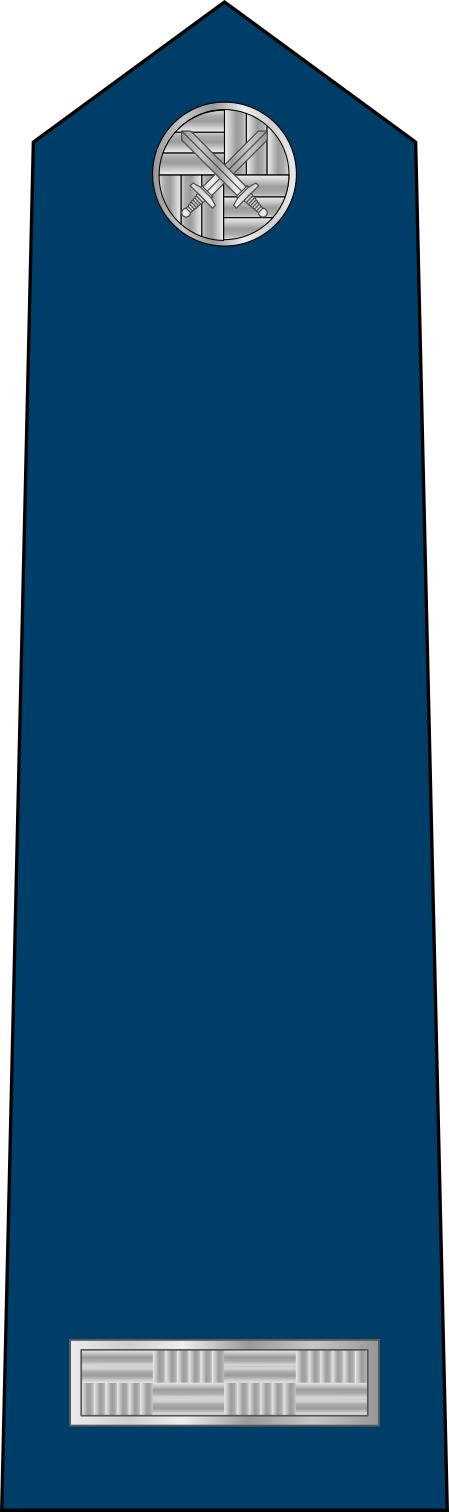
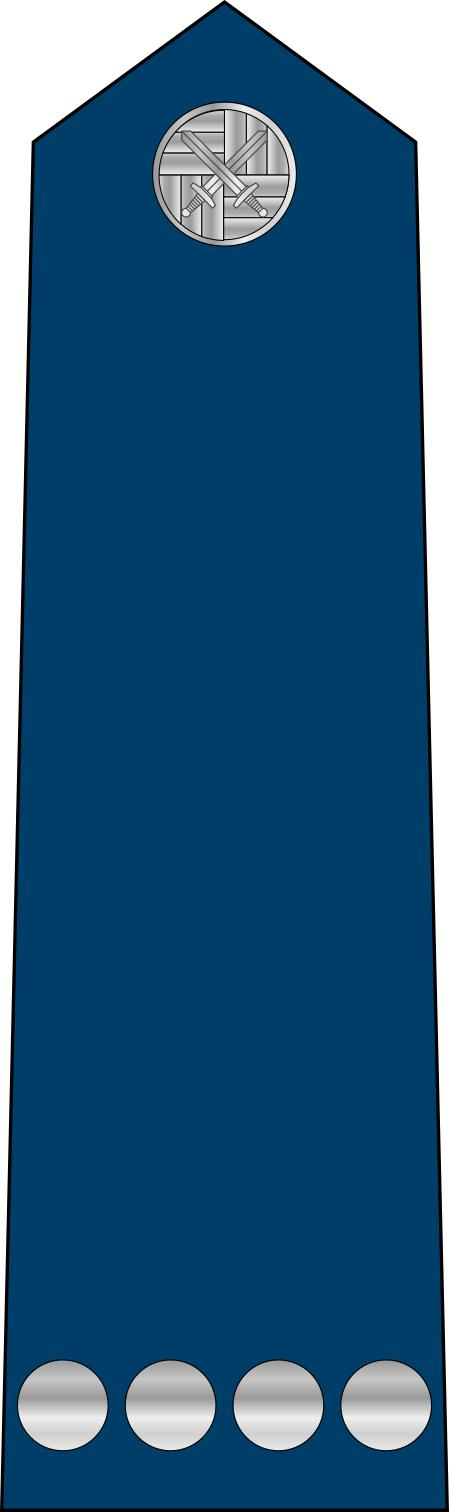
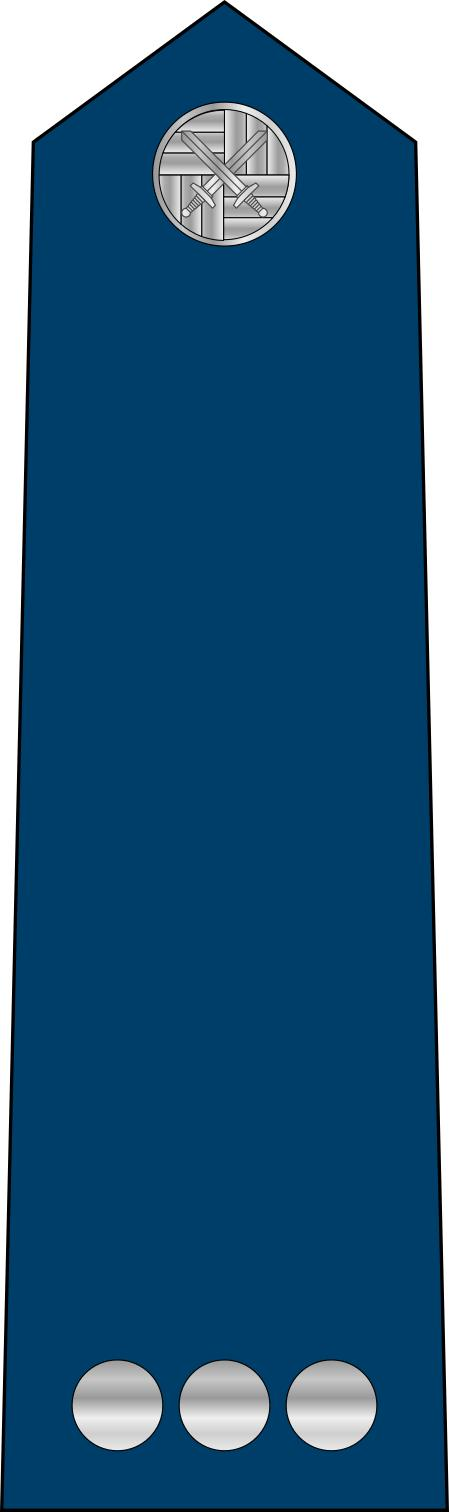
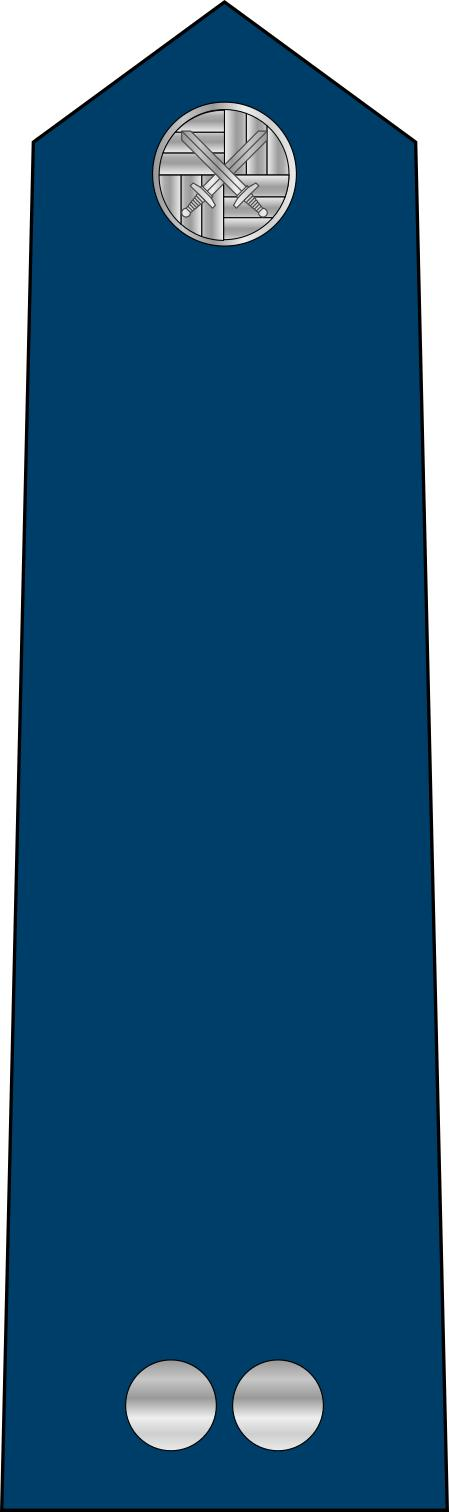
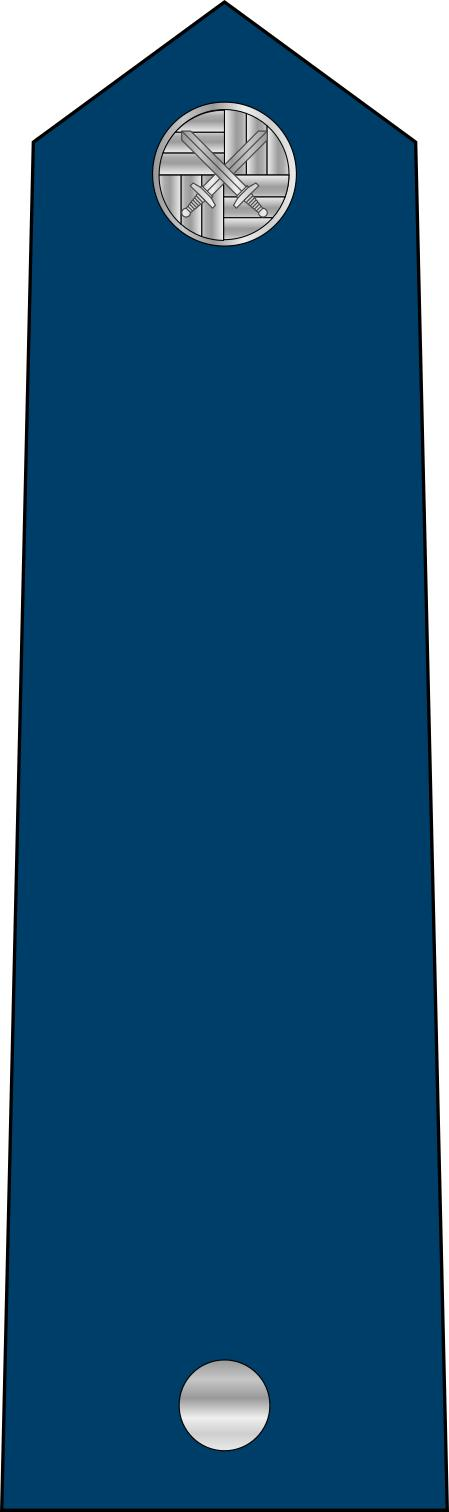
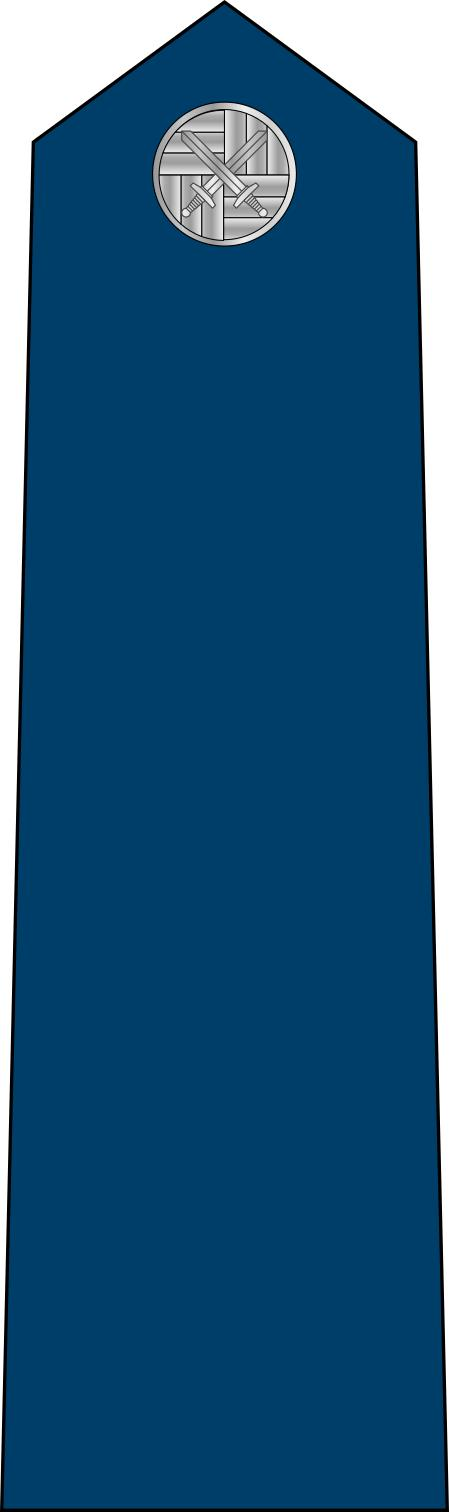
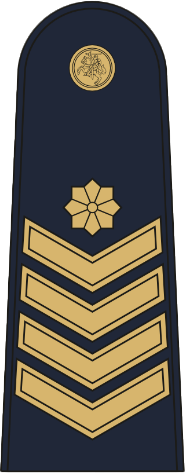
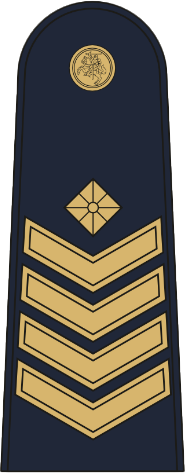
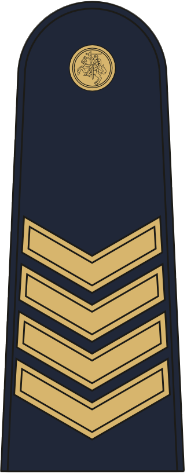
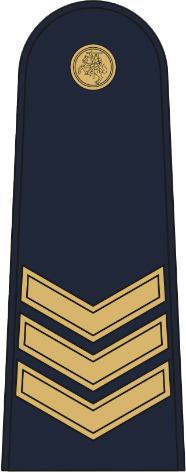
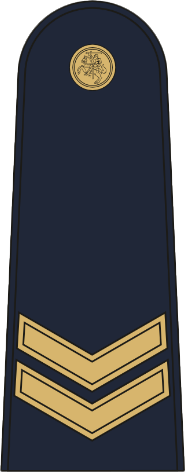
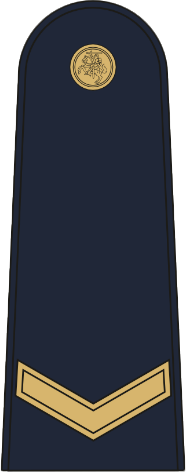
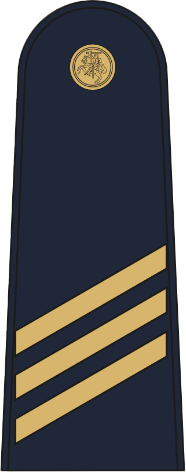
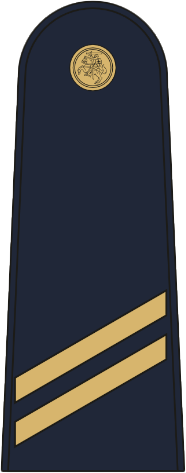
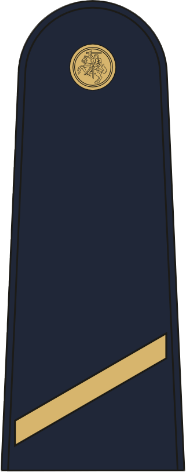
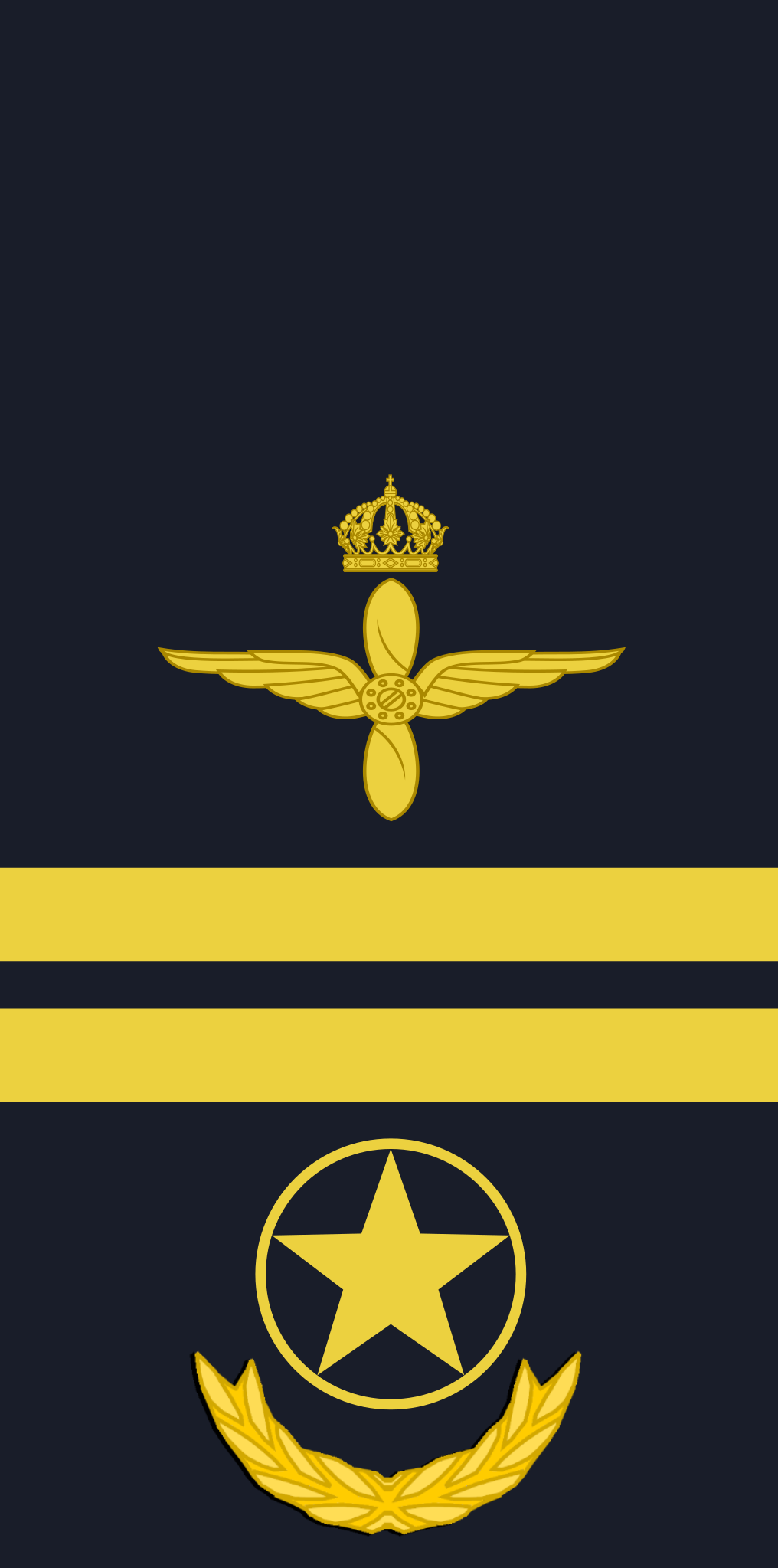
Rank group	Senior NCOs											Junior NCOs						Enlisted
Austrian Air Force
Austrian Air Force	Vizeleutnant		Offiziersstellvertreter	Oberstabswachtmeister		Stabswachtmeister		Oberwachtmeister		Wachtmeister		Zugsführer				Korporal		Gefreiter				Rekrut
Belgian Air Component
Belgian Air Component	Adjudant-Majoor		Adjudant-chef	Adjudant		1ste sergeant-majoor		1ste sergeant-chef	1ste sergeant	Sergeant		1ste korporaal-chef		Korporaal-chef		Korporaal		1ste soldaat				Soldaat
Belgian Air Component	Adjudant-Major		Adjudant-chef	Adjudant		Premier sergent-major		Premier sergent-chef	Premier sergent	Sergent		Premier caporal-chef		Caporal-chef		Caporal		Premier soldat				Soldat
Belgian Air Component	Majoradjutant		Chefadjudant	Adjudant		1er Sergeant Major		1er Sergeant Chef	1er Sergeant	Sergeant		1er Korporal Chef		Korporal Chef		Korporal		1er soldat				Soldat
Bulgarian Air Force
Bulgarian Air Force	Офицерски кандидат Ofitserski kandidat			Старшина; Starshyna		Старши сержант Starshi serzhant		Сержант; Serzhant		Младши сержант Mladshi serzhant		Ефрейтор; Efreytor				Редник; Rednik
Croatian Air Force																						No insignia
Croatian Air Force	Časnički namjesnik			Stožerni narednik		Nadnarednik		Narednik		Desetnik		Skupnik				Razvodnik		Pozornik				Vojnik
Cyprus Air Forces																						Arm/corps insignia only
Cyprus Air Forces	Ανθυπασπιστής; Anthypaspistís			Αρχισμηνίας; Archisminías		Επισμηνίας; Episminías		Σμηνίας; Sminías				Υποσμηνίας; Yposminías				Ανθυποσμηνίας; Anthyposminías						Σμηνίτης; Sminítis
Czech Air Force
Czech Air Force	Štábní praporčík			Nadpraporčík		Praporčík		Nadrotmistr		Rotmistr		Rotný				Četař		Desátník				Svobodník	Vojín
Royal Danish Air Force
Royal Danish Air Force	Chefsergent			Seniorsergent		Oversergent				Sergent	Sergent (Officerselev)	Korporal				Flyverspecialist		Flyveroverkonstabel				Flyverkonstabel
Estonian Air Force
Estonian Air Force	Ülemveebel		Staabiveebel	Vanemveebel		Veebel		Nooremveebel		Vanemseersant		Seersant		Nooremseersant				Kapral				Reamees
Finnish Air Force
Finnish Air Force	Sotilasmestari			Ylivääpeli		Vääpeli		Ylikersantti		Kersantti		Alikersantti				Korpraali		Lentosotamies
Finnish Air Force	Militärmästare			Överfältväbel		Fältväbel		Översergeant		Sergeant		Undersergeant				Korpral		Soldat
Rank group	Senior NCOs											Junior NCOs						Enlisted
(France) French Air and Space Force
(France) French Air and Space Force	Major		Adjudant-chef	Adjudant				Sergent-chef		Sergent		Caporal-chef				Caporal		Aviateur 1^{e} classe				Aviateur 2^{e} classe
German Air Force
German Air Force	Oberstabsfeldwebel			Stabsfeldwebel		Hauptfeldwebel		Oberfeldwebel	Feldwebel	Stabsunteroffizier	Unteroffizier	Stabskorporal	Korporal	Oberstabsgefreiter	Stabsgefreiter	Hauptgefreiter	Obergefreiter	Gefreiter				Flieger
German Air Force (Officer designate)
German Air Force (Officer designate)						Oberfähnrich		Fähnrich		Fahnenjunker
Hellenic Air Force
Hellenic Air Force	Ανθυπασπιστής (Note: Greece has only one level of Warrant Officer. According to the current issue (2021) of STANAG 2116, the Greek Warrant Officers are included in OR-9, however they are afforded the privileges of an officer. See STANAG 2116 note 29, page D-9); Anthypaspistis			Αρχισμηνίας; Archisminias		Επισμηνίας; Episminias		Σμηνίας; Sminias				Υποσμηνίας; Yposminias										Σμηνίτης; Sminitis
Hungarian Air Force
Hungarian Air Force	Főtörzszászlós			Törzszászlós	Zászlós	Főtörzsőrmester		Törzsőrmester		Őrmester		Szakaszvezető				Tizedes		Őrvezető				Közkatona
Irish Air Corps																							No insignia
Irish Air Corps	Regimental sergeant major Maor-sáirsint reisiminte			Regimental quartermaster sergeant Ceathrúsháirsint reisiminte		Flight sergeant Sáirsint eitleoige		Flight quartermaster sergeant Ceathrúsháirsint eitleoige		Sergeant; Sáirsint		Corporal; Ceannaire				Airman 3 star Eitleoir, 3 réalta		Airman 2 Star; Eitleoir, 2 réalta				Apprentice; Printíseach	Recruit; Earcach
Italian Air Force				Maresciallo di prima classe / Maresciallo di seconda classe / Maresciallo di terza classe								Graduato aiutante / Primo graduato / Primo aviere capo / Primo aviere scelto / Aviere capo										No insignia
Italian Air Force	Primo luogotenente	Luogotenente	Primo maresciallo	Maresciallo di prima classe / Maresciallo di seconda classe / Maresciallo di terza classe		Sergente maggiore aiutante	Sergente maggiore capo	Sergente maggiore		Sergente		Graduato aiutante / Primo graduato / Primo aviere capo / Primo aviere scelto / Aviere capo				Primo aviere		Aviere scelto				Aviere
Latvian Air Force
Latvian Air Force	Augstākais virsseržants			Galvenais virsseržants		Štāba virsseržants		Virsseržants		Seržants		Kaprālis				Dižkareivis		Kareivis
Lithuanian Air Force
Lithuanian Air Force	Seržantas majoras			Viršila		Štabo seržantas		Vyresnysis seržantas		Seržantas		Grandinis				Vyresnysis eilinis		Eilinis				Jaunesnysis eilinis
Luxembourg	No air force
Rank group	Senior NCOs											Junior NCOs						Enlisted
Royal Netherlands Air Force
Royal Netherlands Air Force	Adjudant-onderofficier					Sergeant-majoor		Sergeant der 1e klasse		Sergeant		Korporaal der 1e klasse				Korporaal		Soldaat der 1ste klasse		Soldaat der 2de klasse		Soldaat der 3de klasse
Polish Air Force
Polish Air Force	Starszy chorąży sztabowy		Starszy chorąży	Chorąży				Młodszy chorąży		Starszy sierżant		Sierżant				Plutonowy	Starszy kapral	Kapral				Starszy szeregowy	Szeregowy
Portuguese Air Force
Portuguese Air Force	Sargento-mor		Sargento-chefe	Sargento-ajudante		Primeiro-sargento		Segundo-sargento		Furriel	Segundo-furriel	Cabo-de-secção				Cabo-adjunto		Primeiro-cabo		Segundo-cabo		Soldado
Romanian Air Force
Romanian Air Force	Plutonier adjutant principal		Plutonier adjutant	Plutonier-major		Plutonier		Sergent-major		Sergent		Caporal clasa I	Caporal clasa a II-a	Caporal clasa a III-a		Fruntaș		Soldat
(Slovakia) Slovak Air Force
(Slovakia) Slovak Air Force	Štábny nadrotmajster			Nadrotmajster		Rotmajster		Rotný		Čatár		Desiatnik				Slobodník		Vojak 2. stupňa				Vojak 1. stupňa
(Slovenia) Slovenian Air Force and Air Defence
(Slovenia) Slovenian Air Force and Air Defence	Višji štabni praporščak	Štabni praporščak	Višji praporščak	Praporščak	Višji štabni vodnik	Štabni vodnik		Višji vodnik		Vodnik		Naddesetnik				Desetnik		Poddesetnik				Vojak
Spanish Air and Space Force
Spanish Air and Space Force	Suboficial mayor		Subteniente	Brigada		Sargento primero		Sargento		Cabo mayor		Cabo primero				Cabo		Soldado de primera				Soldado
Swedish Air Force
Swedish Air Force	Flottiljförvaltare			Förvaltare		Överfanjunkare	Fanjunkare	Översergeant	Sergeant	Överfurir	Furir	Korpral				Vicekorpral		Menig 4	Menig 3	Menig 2	Menig 1	Menig
Rank group	Senior NCOs											Junior NCOs						Enlisted

== See also ==
- Comparative air force officer ranks of the European Union
- Military rank
- Comparative army officer ranks of the European Union
- Comparative army enlisted ranks of the European Union
- Comparative navy officer ranks of the European Union
- Comparative navy enlisted ranks of the European Union
- Ranks and insignia of NATO air forces enlisted
- Comparative air force enlisted ranks of Europe
