= Comparative navy enlisted ranks of the European Union =

Rank comparison chart of all navies of the European Union member states. Some EU member states do not have naval forces, either because they are landlocked Austria, the Czech Republic, Hungary, Luxembourg and Slovakia.

The Cyprus Navy is the naval branch of the Cypriot National Guard. NATO has a scheme for comparative ranks for member countries; non-NATO countries equivalence is determined against this system.

== Enlisted (OR 1–9) ==
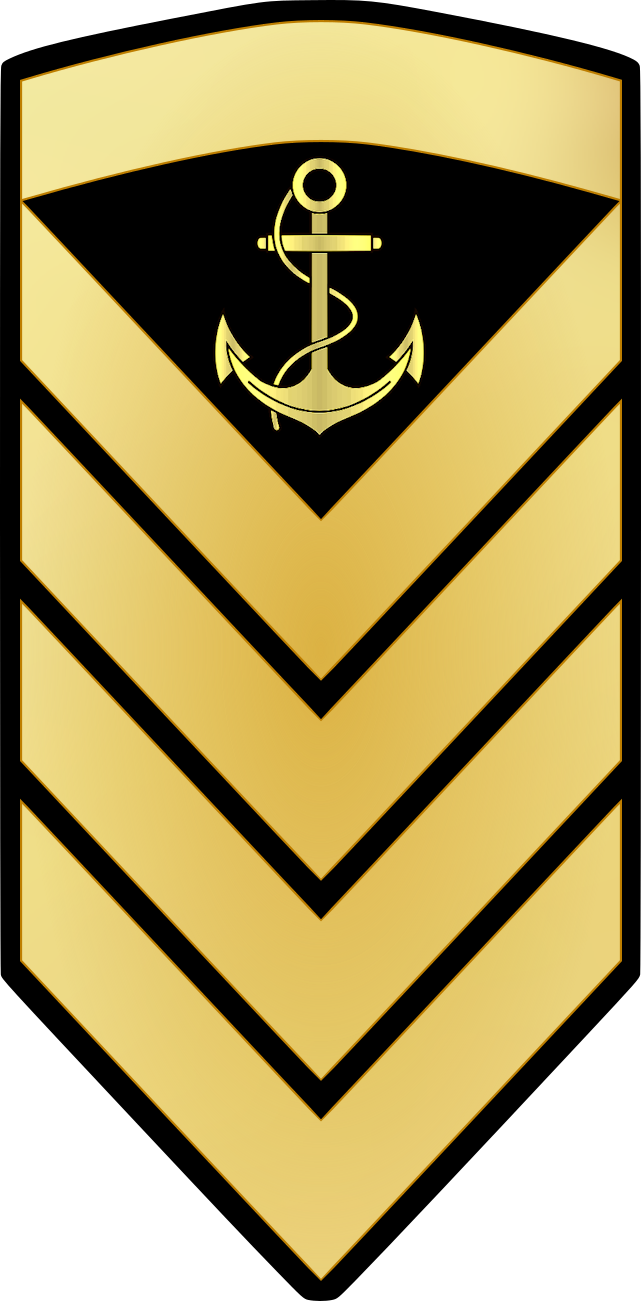
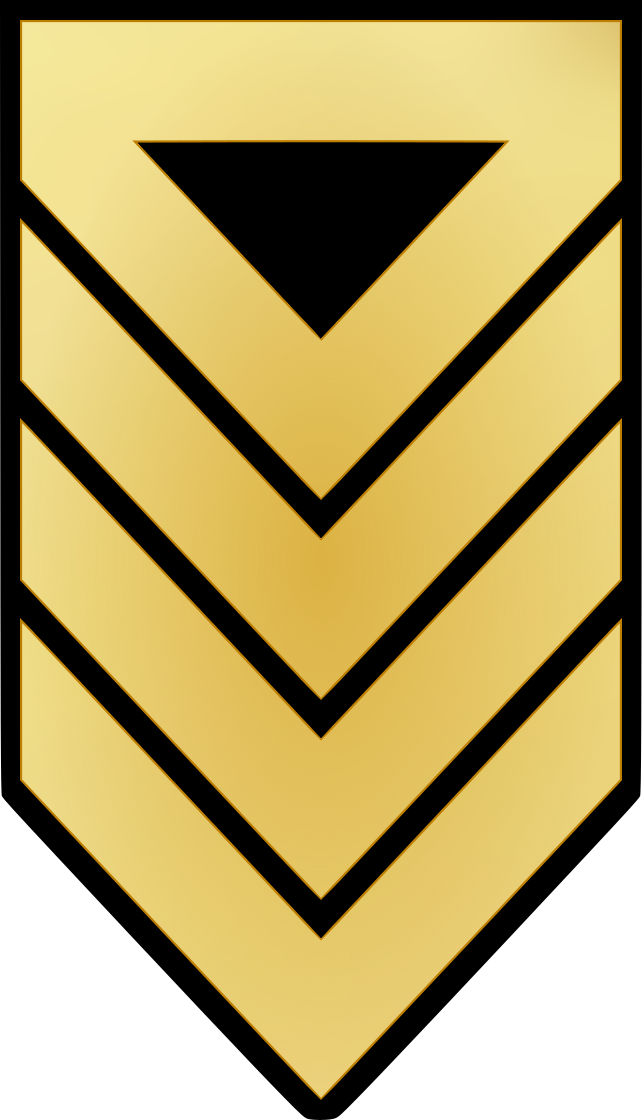
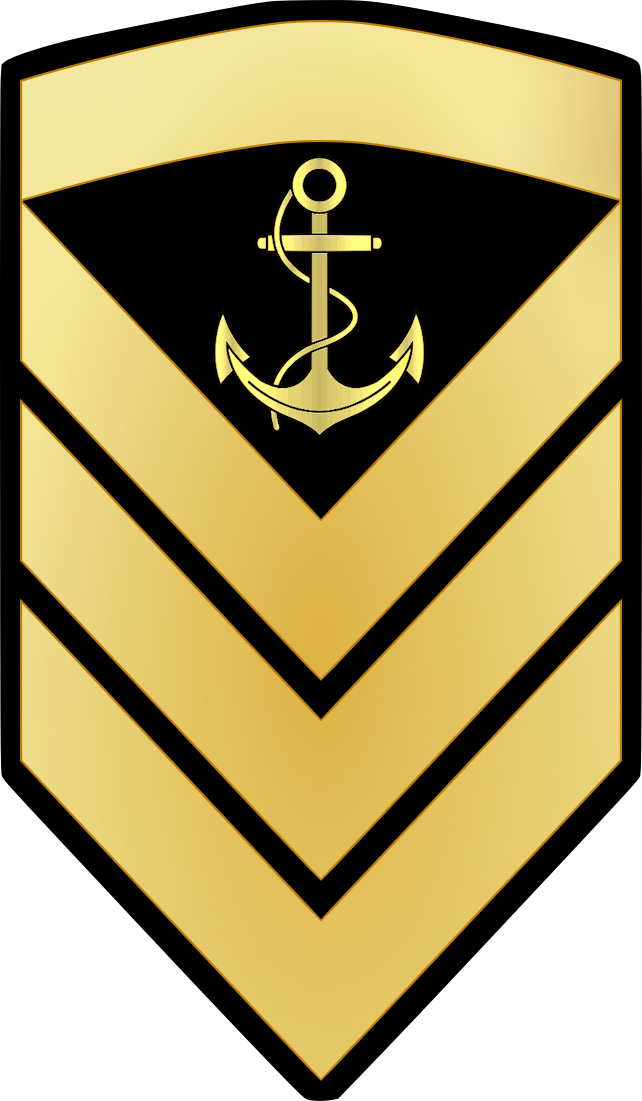
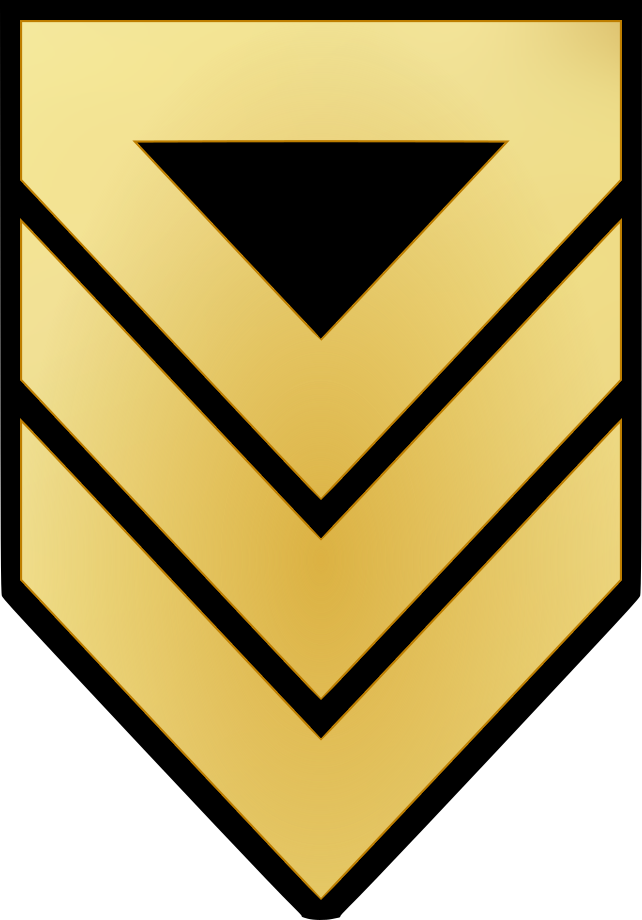
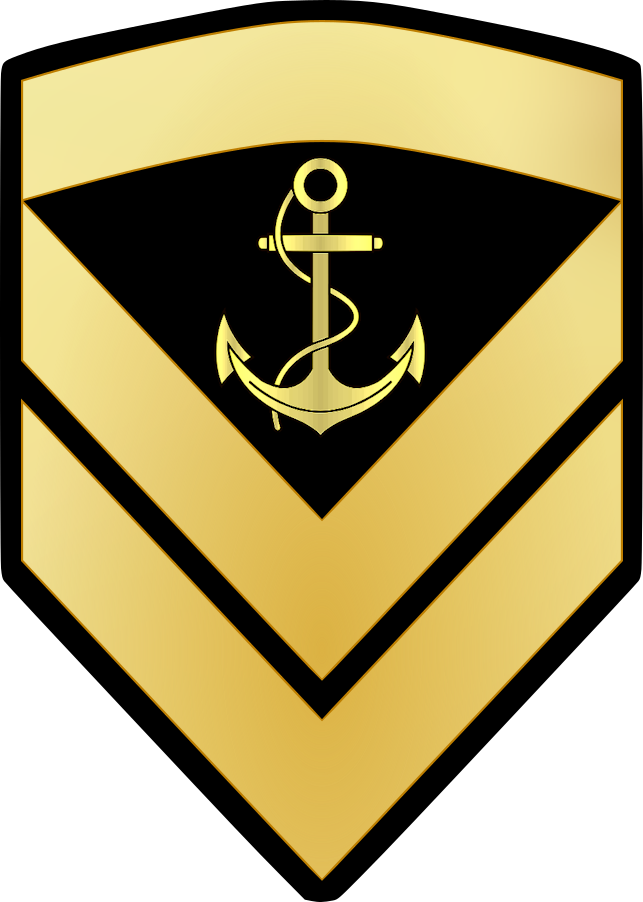
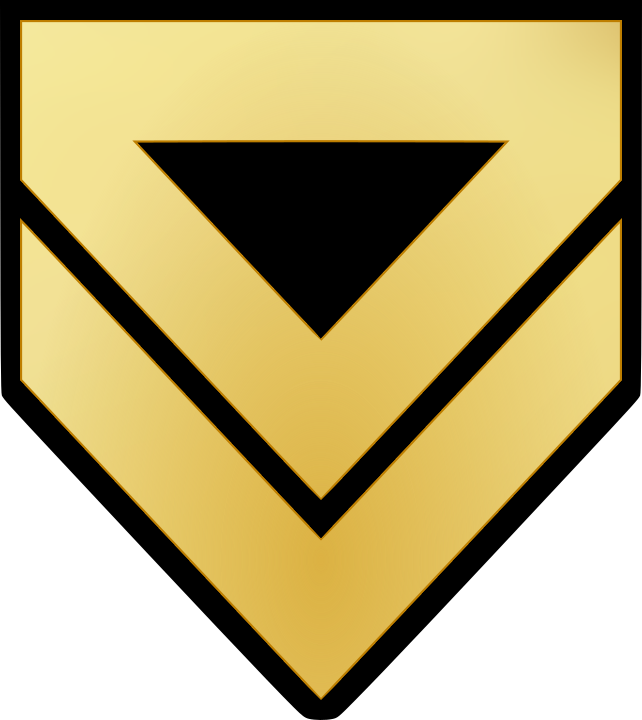
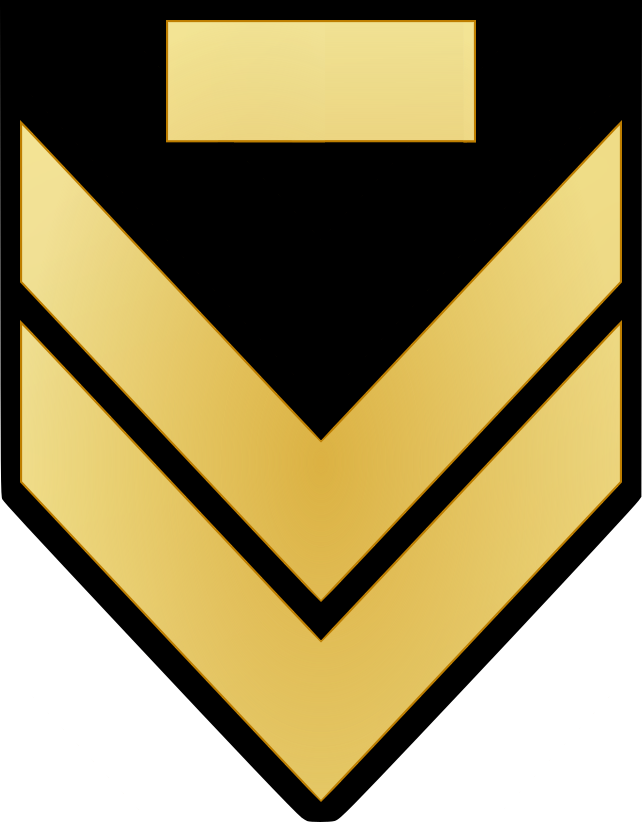
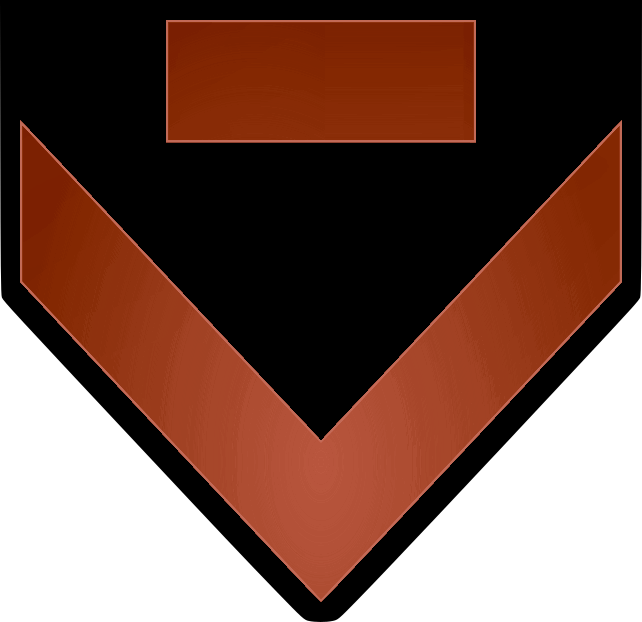
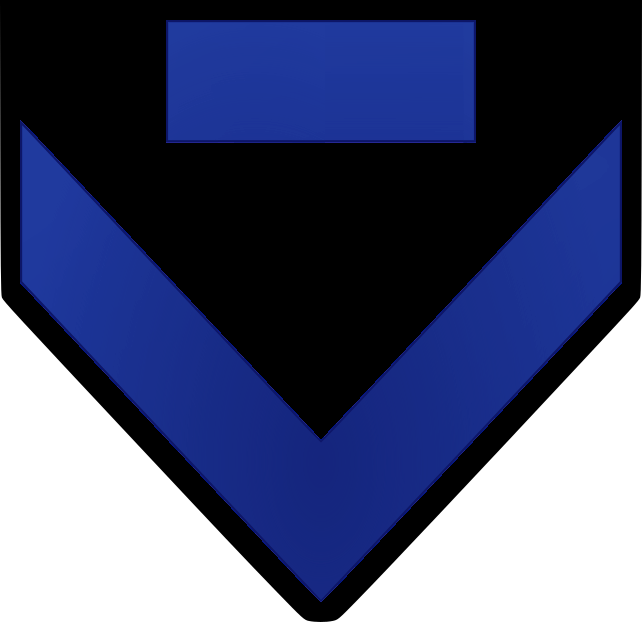
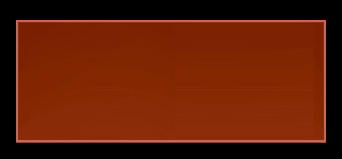
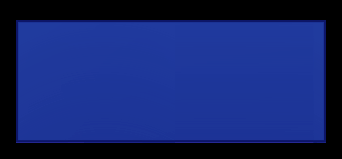
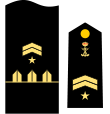
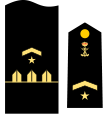
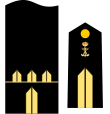
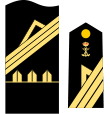
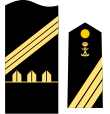
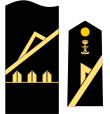
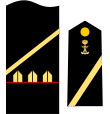
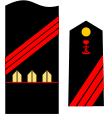
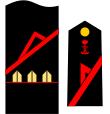
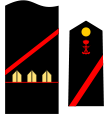
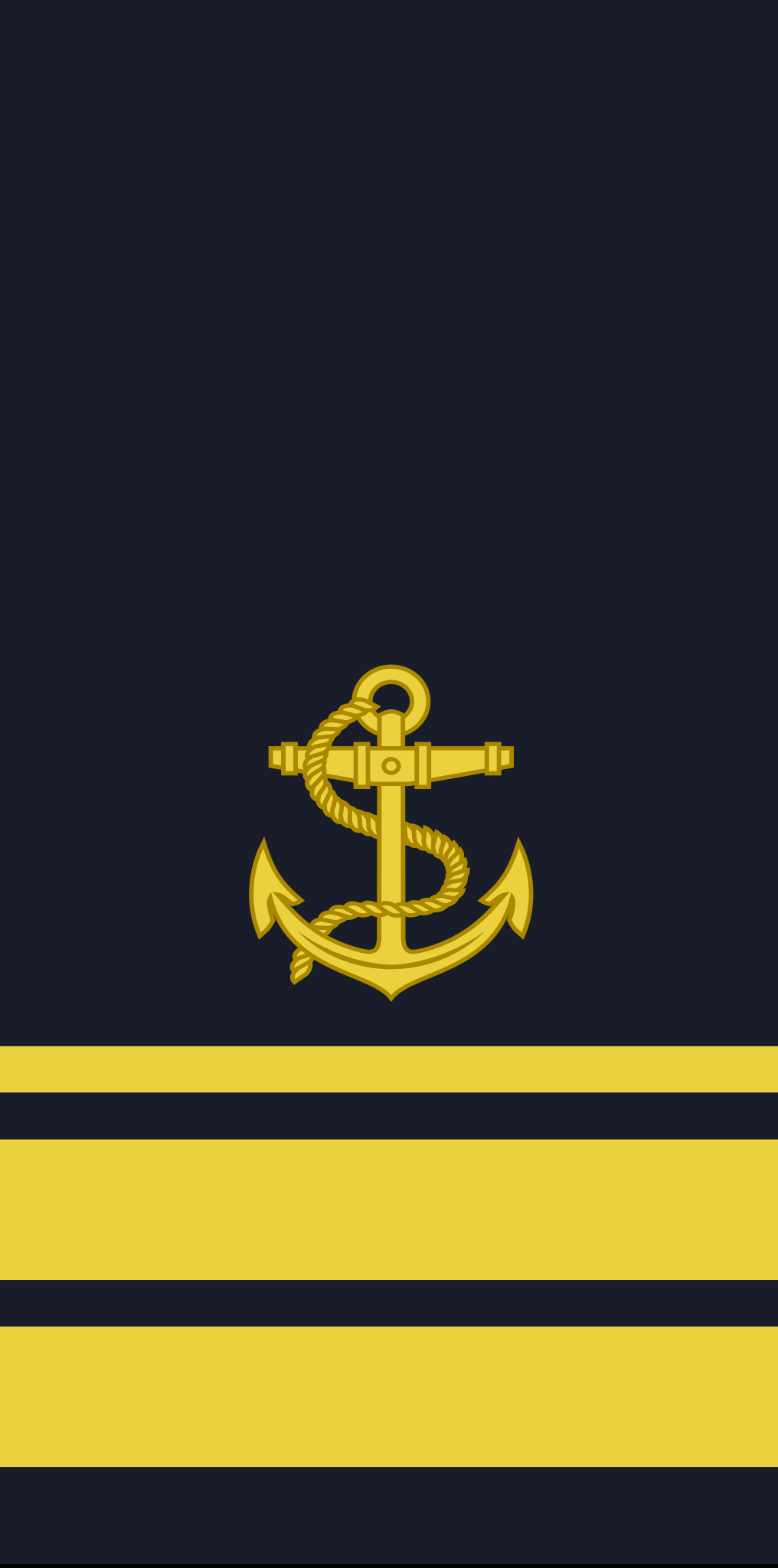
Rank group	Senior NCOs											Junior NCOs						Enlisted
Austria	No navy
Belgian Navy
Belgian Navy	Oppermeester-chef		Oppermeester	Eerste meesterchef		Eerste meester		Meester-chef	Meester	Tweede meester		Eerste kwartiermeester-chef		Kwartiermeester-chef		Kwartiermeester		Eerste matroos				Matroos
Belgian Navy	Maître principal-chef		Maître-principal	Premier-maître chef		Premier maître		Maître-chef	Maître	Second-maître		Premier quartier-maître-chef		Quartier-maître-chef		Quartier maître		Premier matelot				Matelot
Belgian Navy	Chefhauptmeister		Hauptmeister	Erster chefmeister		Erster meister		Meister-chef	Meister	Zweiter meister		Erster oberquartiermeister		Oberquartiermeister		Quartiermeister		Erster matrose				Matrose
Bulgarian Navy
Bulgarian Navy	Офицерски кандидат Ofitserski kandidat			Мичман; Mičman		Главен старшина Glaven starshina		Старшина 1 степен Starshina 1 stepen		Старшина 2 степен Starshina 2 stepen		Старши матрос Starshi matros				Матрос; Matros
Croatian Navy																						No insignia
Croatian Navy	Časnički namjesnik			Stožerni narednik		Nadnarednik		Narednik		Desetnik		Skupnik				Razvodnik		Pozornik				Mornar
Cyprus Navy																						Arm/corps insignia only
Cyprus Navy	Ανθυπασπιστής; Anthypaspistís			Αρχικελευστής; Archikelefstís		Επικελευστής; Epikelefstís		Κελευστής; Kelefstís				Δίοπος; Díopos				Υποδίοπος; Ypodíopos						Ναύτης; Náftis
Czech Republic	No navy
Royal Danish Navy
Royal Danish Navy	Chefsergent			Seniorsergent		Oversergent				Sergent	Sergent SØ	Korporal				Marinespecialist		Marineoverkonstabel				Marinekonstabel
Estonian Navy
Estonian Navy	Ülemveebel		Staabiveebel	Vanemveebel		Veebel		Nooremveebel		Vanemmaat		Maat		Nooremmaat				Vanemmadrus				Madrus
Finnish Navy
Finnish Navy	Sotilasmestari			Ylipursimies		Pursimies		Ylikersantti		Kersantti		Alikersantti				Ylimatruusi		Matruusi
Finnish Navy	Militärmästare			Överbåtsman		Båtsman		Översergeant		Sergeant		Undersergeant				Övermatros		Matros
Rank group	Senior NCOs											Junior NCOs						Enlisted
French Navy
French Navy	Major		Maître principal	Premier maître				Maître		Second-maître		Quartier-maître de 1^{ère} classe				Quartier-maître de 2^{ème} classe		Matelot breveté				Matelot
German Navy																						No insignia
German Navy	Oberstabsbootsmann			Stabsbootsmann		Hauptbootsmann		Oberbootsmann	Bootsmann	Obermaat	Maat	Stabskorporal	Korporal	Oberstabsgefreiter	Stabsgefreiter	Hauptgefreiter	Obergefreiter	Gefreiter				Matrose
German Navy (Officer designate)
German Navy (Officer designate)						Oberfähnrich zur See		Fähnrich zur See		Seekadett
Hellenic Navy												male		female								male	female
Hellenic Navy	Ανθυπασπιστής (Note: Greece has only one level of Warrant Officer. According to the current issue (2021) of STANAG 2116, the Greek Warrant Officers are included in OR-9, however they are afforded the privileges of an officer. See STANAG 2116 note 29, page D-9); Anthypaspistis			Αρχικελευστής; Archikelefstis		Επικελευστής; Epikelefstis		Κελευστής; Kelefstis				Δίοπος; Diopos										Ναύτης; Naftis
Hungarian River Guard
Hungarian River Guard	Főtörzszászlós			Törzszászlós	Zászlós	Főtörzsőrmester		Törzsőrmester		Őrmester		Szakaszvezető				Tizedes		Őrvezető				Közkatona
Irish Naval Service																						No insignia
Irish Naval Service	Warrant officer Oifigeach barántais			Senior chief petty officer Ard-mhion-oifigeach sinsearach		Chief petty officer Ard-mhion-oifigeach		Senior petty officer Mion-oifigeach sinsearach		Petty officer Mion-oifigeach		Leading seaman Mairnéalach ceannais				Able seaman Mairnéalach inniúil		Ordinary seaman Mairnéalach				Seaman recruit Earcach
Italian Navy				Capo di prima classe / Capo di seconda classe / Capo di terza classe								Sottocapo aiutante / Sottocapo scelto / Sottocapo di prima classe / Sottocapo di seconda classe / Sottocapo di terza classe										No insignia
Italian Navy	Primo luogotenente	Luogotenente	Primo maresciallo	Capo di prima classe / Capo di seconda classe / Capo di terza classe		Secondo aiutante	Secondo capo scelto	Secondo capo		Sergente		Sottocapo aiutante / Sottocapo scelto / Sottocapo di prima classe / Sottocapo di seconda classe / Sottocapo di terza classe				Comune scelto		Comune di prima classe				Comune di seconda classe
Latvian Naval Forces
Latvian Naval Forces	Vecākais virsniekvietnieks			Virsniekvietnieks		Vecākais bocmanis		Bocmanis		Seržants		Kaprālis				Dižmatrozis		Matrozis
Lithuanian Naval Force
Lithuanian Naval Force	Vyresnysis laivūnas			Laivūnas		Štabo laivūnas		Vyresnysis seržantas		Seržantas		Grandinis				Vyresnysis jūreivis		Jūreivis				Jaunesnysis jūreivis
(Luxembourg) Luxemburg	No navy
Rank group	Senior NCOs											Junior NCOs						Enlisted
Maritime Squadron of Malta																		No insignia
Maritime Squadron of Malta	Warrant Officer Class 1			Warrant Officer Class 2		Staff Sergeant		Sergeant				Bombardier				Lance Bombardier		Gunner (or equivalent)
Royal Netherlands Navy																						No insignia
Royal Netherlands Navy	Adjudant-onderofficier/ Opperschipper					Sergeant-majoor/ Schipper		Sergeant/ Bootsman				Korporaal/ Kwartiermeester						Matroos der 1e klasse		Matroos der 2e klasse		Matroos der 3e klasse
Polish Navy																							No insignia
Polish Navy	Starszy chorąży sztabowy marynarki		Starszy chorąży marynarki	Chorąży marynarki				Młodszy chorąży marynarki		Starszy bosman		Bosman				Bosmanmat	Starszy mat	Mat				Starszy marynarz	Marynarz
Portuguese Navy																				No insignia		No insignia
Portuguese Navy	Sargento-mor		Sargento-chefe	Sargento-ajudante		Primeiro-sargento		Segundo-sargento		Subsargento		Cabo-mor		Cabo		Primeiro-marinheiro		Segundo-marinheiro		Primeiro-grumete		Segundo-grumete
Romanian Naval Forces																		No insignia
Romanian Naval Forces	Plutonier adjutant principal		Plutonier adjutant	Plutonier-major		Plutonier		Sergent-major		Sergent		Caporal clasa I	Caporal clasa a II-a	Caporal clasa a III-a		Fruntaș		Soldat
Slovakia	No navy
Slovenia Navy
Slovenia Navy	Višji štabni praporščak	Štabni praporščak	Višji praporščak	Praporščak	Višji štabni vodnik	Štabni vodnik		Višji vodnik		Vodnik		Naddesetnik				Desetnik		Poddesetnik				Vojak
Spanish Navy
Spanish Navy	Suboficial mayor		Subteniente	Brigada		Sargento primero		Sargento		Cabo mayor		Cabo primero				Cabo		Marinero de primera				Marinero
Spanish Marine Infantry
Spanish Marine Infantry	Suboficial mayor		Subteniente	Brigada		Sargento primero		Sargento		Cabo mayor		Cabo primero				Cabo		Soldado de primera				Soldado
Swedish Navy
Swedish Navy	Flottiljförvaltare			Förvaltare		Överfanjunkare	Fanjunkare	Översergeant	Sergeant	Överfurir	Furir	Korpral				Vicekorpral		Menig 4	Menig 3	Menig 2	Menig 1	Menig
Rank group	Senior NCOs											Junior NCOs						Enlisted

== See also ==
- Comparative navy officer ranks of the European Union
- Military rank
- Comparative army officer ranks of the European Union
- Comparative army enlisted ranks of the European Union
- Comparative air force officer ranks of the European Union
- Comparative air force enlisted ranks of the European Union
- Ranks and insignia of NATO navies enlisted
- Comparative navy enlisted ranks of Europe
