= Maanpuolustusopisto =

Finnish military junior college (1993–2001)

Coordinates: 61°3′31″N 28°10′30″E

Maanpuolustusopisto (MpO, 'National Defence Institute') was a military institution of post-secondary vocational education of the Finnish Defence Forces, located in Lappeenranta. The school had a separate program for training warrant officers "vocationally" such that they would graduate as Second Lieutenants (vänrikki) without going to the national military academy's Cadet School.

In 2001, the school was renamed and repurposed as the Army Academy (Maasotakoulu). The successor institution provides the branch-specific education of all army cadets of the National Defence University as part of their undergraduate studies and trains the NCO corps of the Finnish Army.

The last cohorts from the school were quickly promoted to luutnantti.

== History ==
The origin of the school was in the career non-commissioned officers' school (Finnish: Kanta-aliupseerikoulu) of the Finnish Army. In 1974, however, professional NCOs (Finnish: kanta-aliupseeri) were promoted to warrant officers called toimiupseeri (The Finnish word toimi refers to a specialist post) and the school became Päällystöopisto "Command School". Graduates would be promoted to staff sergeant (Finnish: vääpeli), an NCO rank, but with suitable additional training, they had the possibility of reaching the lowest officer ranks.

In 1993, accordance with the general restructuring of the educational system, where similar postsecondary-level schools were recategorized as tertiary, the school was also renamed as Maanpuolustusopisto. The educational program 2.5 years and graduates were to be promoted directly to Second lieutenant (vänrikki), an officer rank.

The rank of the students was opistoupseerioppilas, which was equivalent to staff sergeant (ylikersantti), and they would be promoted to second lieutenant on graduation. The graduates could be promoted up to first lieutenant (yliluutnantti) and in later years, to captain (kapteeni). During peace-time, the warrant officers would act in duties ranging from training officer and platoon commander to company XO, in units training conscripts. The war time duty would be the XO of a company or the leader of a separate platoon.

The last course of the Maanpuolustusopisto graduated in 2003, and the warrant officer corps will be phased out via retirement. The last graduates will retire in 2037. Today, the warrant officers' careers have mainly surpassed the company level stage and they serve mostly in the various headquarter and staff positions as senior experts of their fields. Some of the warrant officers have taken the opportunity to take a degree in the National Defence University and continue their career as career officers. The duties of the warrant officers will be mostly taken over by the NCO corps.
