= Sotilasmestari =

- Country: Finland
- Next higher rank: Vänrikki (Fänrik)
- Next lower rank: Ylivääpeli (Överfältväbel)

Sotilasmestari (militärmästare in Swedish, chief warrant officer or sergeant major in English) is a Finnish military rank above ylivääpeli (överfältväbel) and below vänrikki (fänrik).

== History and related ranks ==
The rank derives from the erikoismestari (master specialist) rank that was originally available only in some branches of service. Early in the history of independent Finland's armed forces, graduates of the professional NCO school (see Maanpuolustusopisto) were promoted to vääpeli (sergeant first class) upon graduation, but could not be promoted further, which led to frustration among outstandingly competent NCOs. Because of this, the erikoismestari rank was made available to all branches, and renamed sotilasmestari (sergeant major, 'master soldier' directly translated from Finnish). Furthermore, the rank of ylivääpeli (master sergeant) was also introduced. A Finnish speciality was that sotilasmestari was ranked higher in Finnish army than vänrikki (second lieutenant) in peace time. That was because sotilasmestari was a professional soldier with decades of experience, but vänrikki (second lieutenant) was a young reservist or a fresh graduate of the Cadet School. In wartime, the tables turned and vänrikki (second lieutenant) was higher than sotilasmestari.

In a 1993 reform, the professional NCO school (Maanpuolustusopisto) was "upgraded" such that graduates received the rank of vänrikki (second lieutenant) upon graduation, and the intermediate ranks (vääpeli, ylivääpeli, sotilasmestari) were no longer actively awarded. The old NCOs with these ranks in active service were automatically promoted to officers overnight in August 1994. The rank of sotilasmestari remained active until the last NCOs with the rank retired, or were promoted to luutnantti (first lieutenant).

The professional NCO corps was founded again in 2007, and these ranks were reactivated. Only the old Finnish speciality that sotilasmestari was senior to vänrikki in peacetime was abolished.

== See also ==
- Finnish military ranks
