= Ylivääpeli =

Military rank in Finland

- Country: Finland
- Next higher rank: Sotilasmestari (Militärmästare)
- Next lower rank: Vääpeli (Fältväbel)

Ylivääpeli (Swedish: överfältväbel) is a Finnish military rank above vääpeli (fältväbel) and below sotilasmestari (militärmästare).

== History and related ranks ==
The rank was introduced to promote professional NCOs, graduated from Maanpuolustusopisto, in the rank of vääpeli, with a similar purpose as the higher rank of sotilasmestari. Between 1993 and 2007 the rank was not actively awarded.

== See also ==
- Finnish military ranks
