= Corporal major =

Military rank

Corporal major is a non-commissioned officer military rank, used in some countries.

== Italy ==
The rank of caporale maggiore can be traced back to at least 1915, used by the Royal Italian Army. It is still used by the Italian Army.

== Spain ==
The rank of corporal major was introduced on 18 May 1999. One can only be promoted to after serving three years as a first corporal as well as completing a corresponding training course.

== NATO code ==
While the rank is used in some NATO countries, it is ranked differently depending on the country.

NATO code	Country	English equivalent	
NATO code	Country	UK	US
OR-6	Spain	Sergeant	Staff sergeant
OR-3	Italy	Lance corporal	Private first class

== Gallery ==
Cabo mayor
(Spanish Army)

Caporal maggiore
(Italian Army)

== See also ==
- Master corporal
