= Veebel =

Military rank of Estonia

Veebel is an Estonian military rank which has existed since the 20th century. The word veebel is derived from the German rank name of Feldwebel, and is usually, but incorrectly, translated into English as 'sergeant'. The official translation given by the Estonian Army is Warrant Officer, although the rank is equivalent to the British Army rank of Sergeant in the NATO code.

== Defence Forces ==
Pagunid	Auaste	Rank	NATO
Non-commissioned officers
	Veebel	Sergeant First Class	OR-7

The rank marks mainly senior non-commissioned officers in the Estonian Army and Estonian Air Force.

== See also ==
- Military ranks of Estonia
- Ranks and insignia of NATO Armies Enlisted (Army)
- Ranks and insignia of NATO
