= Senior sergeant =

Non-commissioned officer military or police rank

A senior sergeant is often a rank of non-commissioned officer used in the armed forces of many nations. It is usually placed above sergeant.

Police in Australia and New Zealand use the rank senior sergeant as a rank above sergeant, but below an inspector. The rank is equivalent to an inspector in the London Metropolitan Police or a lieutenant in the Los Angeles Police Department.

== Countries ==
=== Australia ===
Other than for the Australian Federal Police, senior sergeant exists for the Australian police ranks. In Tasmania Police, senior sergeant is a title, within the rank of sergeant.

=== Denmark ===
In the Danish Defence, there are two senior sergeant ranks, Oversergent (lit. 'Upper/Senior sergeant') and Seniorsergent (lit. 'Senior sergeant'). However, the Danish Defence officially translates the rank with the equivalents in the British Armed Forces, as such the ranks have different official translations depending on the branch.

NATO Code	OR-8	OR-7
Danish	Seniorsergent	Oversergent
Royal Danish Army
English	Warrant officer class II	Sergeant first class
Royal Danish Navy
English	Senior chief petty officer	Chief petty officer
Royal Danish Air Force
English	Warrant officer	Flight sergeant

=== Russia ===
Senior sergeant (Russian: Ста́рший сержант, romanized: Stárshiy serzhant) is the designation to the second highest rank in the non-commissioned officer's career group in the army, airborne troops, naval infantry and air force of the Russian Federation. The rank is equivalent to glavny starshina in the navy.

The rank was introduced in the Red Army in 1940.

== Insignia of senior sergeants ==
=== Army ===
ԱՎԱԳ ՍԵՐԺԱՆՏ
Avag Serzhant
(Armenian Ground Forces)

Baş çavuş
(Azerbaijani Land Forces)

Старшы сяржант
Staršy siaržant
(Belarusian Ground Forces)

Stariji vodnik
(Bosnian Ground Forces)

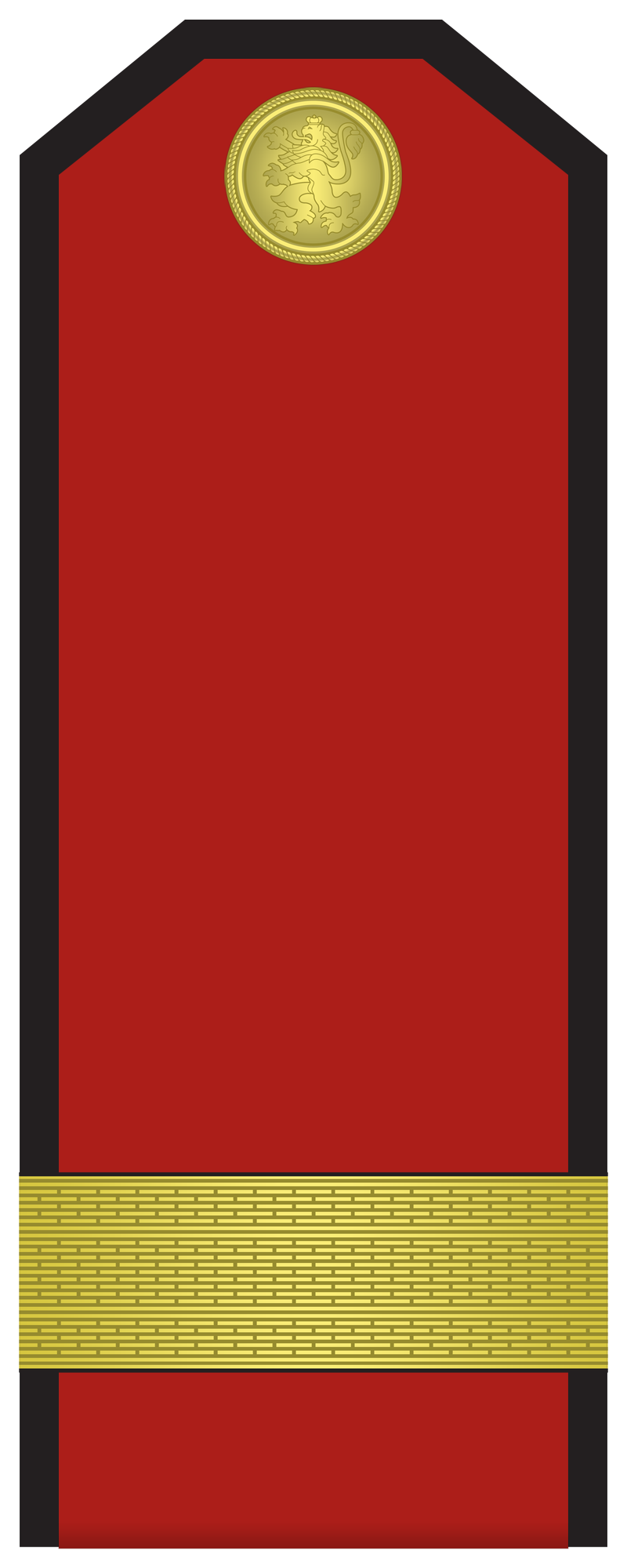
Старши сержант
Starshi serzhant
(Bulgarian Land Forces)

Nadnarednik
(Croatian Army)

Seniorsergent
(Royal Danish Army)

Vanemseersant
(Estonian Ground Forces)

Översergeant
(Finnish: Ylikersantti)
(Finnish Army)

უფროსი სერჟანტი
Uprosi serzhant'i
(Georgian Land Forces)

Аға сержант
Ağa serjant
(Kazakh Ground Forces)

Улук сержант
Uluk serjant
(Kyrgyz Army)

Vyresnysis seržantas
(Lithuanian Land Force)

Постар водник
Postar vodnik
(North Macedonian Ground Forces)

Aхлах ахлагч
Akhlakh akhlagch
(Mongolian Ground Force)

Stariji vodnik
(Montenegrin Ground Army)

Oversersjant
(Norwegian Army)

Starszy sierżant
(Polish Army)

Ста́рший сержа́нт
Stárshiy serzhánt
(Russian Ground Forces)

Старији водник
Stariji vodnik
(Serbian Army)

Višji vodnik
(Slovenian Ground Force)

Översergeant
(Swedish Army)

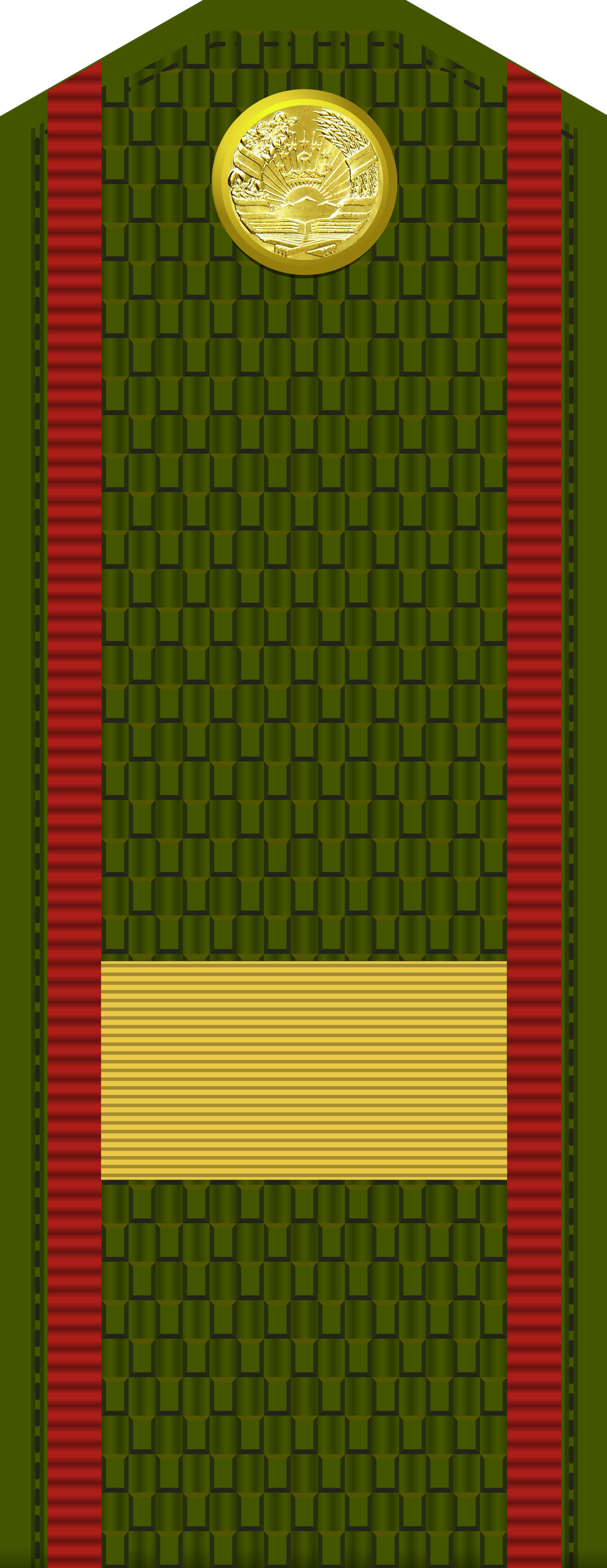
Сержанти калон
Serƶanti kalon
(Tajik Ground Forces)

Uly seržant
(Turkmen Ground Forces)

Старший сержант
Starshyy serzhant
(Ukrainian Ground Forces)

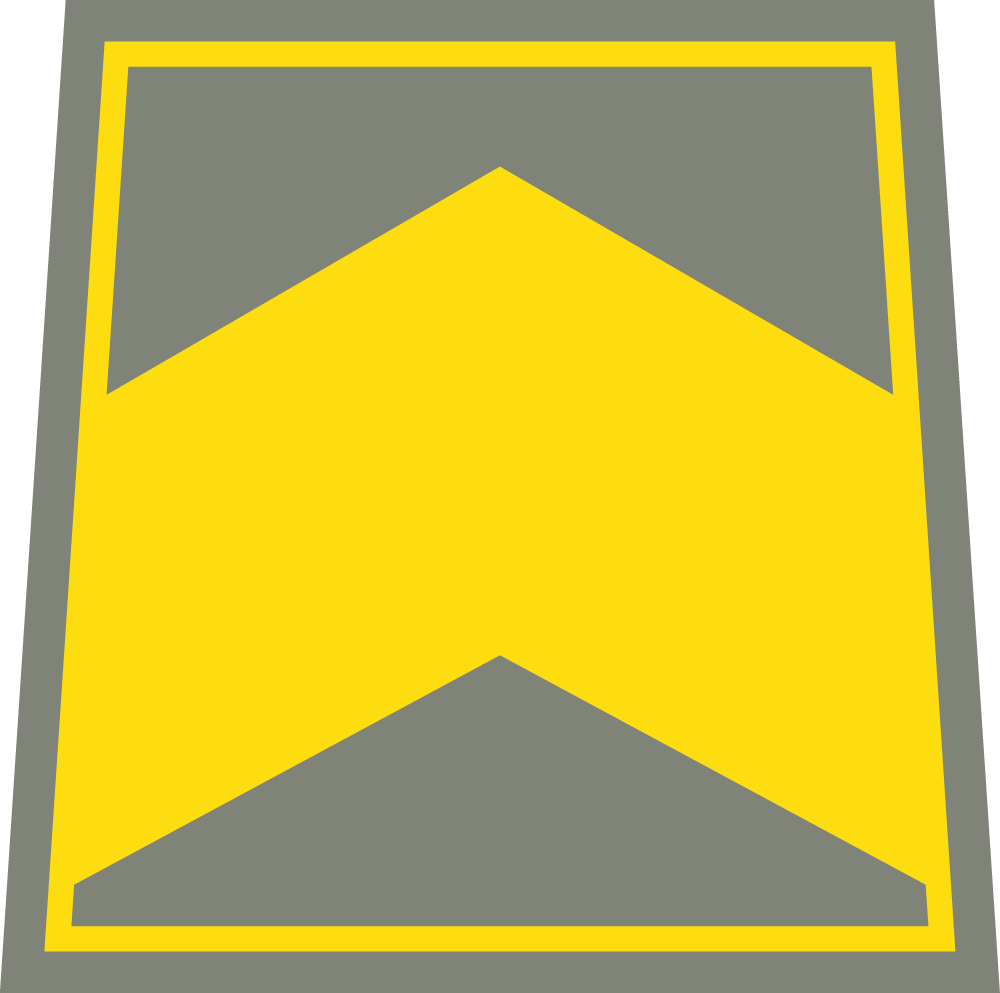
Katta serjant
(Uzbek Ground Forces)

=== Police ===
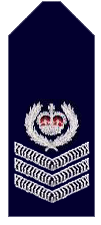
New South Wales Police Force

Northern Territory Police

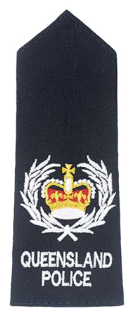
Queensland Police Service

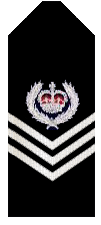
South Australia Police

Tasmania Police

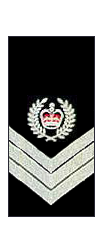
Victoria Police

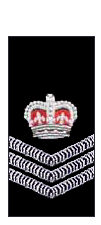
Western Australia Police Force

New Zealand Police

== See also ==
- Sergeant
- Junior sergeant
