= Vääpeli =

Vääpeli fältväbel (Swedish)
- Country: Finland (Sweden)
- Next higher rank: Ylivääpeli (Överfältväbel)
- Next lower rank: Ylikersantti (Översergeant)

Vääpeli (fältväbel in Swedish) is a Finnish and former Swedish non-commissioned officer military rank above ylikersantti (översergeant) and below ylivääpeli (överfältväbel). The rank is derived from the German rank Feldwebel and was used as a rank in the Landsknecht (15th and 16th century) for the one who was responsible for aligning troops during battle.

Vääpelis were trained at the Maanpuolustusopisto, a military junior college, and were usually salaried staff NCOs, as opposed to conscripts or officers.

== Yksikön vääpeli ==
Vääpeli may also refer to a position – rather than a rank – of yksikön vääpeli ('vääpeli of the unit'), commonly komppanian vääpeli or patterin vääpeli ('vääpeli of the company', 'vääpeli of the battery'), which is a position similar to first sergeant in the US Armed Forces or company sergeant major of the British and Commonwealth Armed Forces. Yet, in the Finnish Defence Force, this position may be held by either a commissioned or a non-commissioned officer, while in the US, UK and Commonwealth militaries, the equivalent position is always held by an NCO.

In the chain of command of a company (or an artillery battery) the yksikön vääpeli is second only to the company commander and therefore may be in command of officers that are, technically, of a higher rank. Usually the position is held by a lieutenant or an yliluutnantti (senior lieutenant), but it is not unheard of for it to be held by a sergeant.

The term yksikköupseeri ('officer of the unit'), although officially discontinued since July 2009, may regardless unofficially be used of the position. In the artillery, the equivalent was patteriupseeri ('officer of the battery') which continues to be used similarly in unofficial contexts.

== History and related ranks ==
=== Sweden ===
Fältväbel has been used as the designation for the highest non-commissioned officer rank in the infantry since the 16th century. It was replaced in 1837 with the rank of fanjunkare. During the 1940s, the rank was used within the youth organization of the Swedish Central Federation for Voluntary Military Training.

=== Finland ===
The rank was established as the highest non-commissioned officer rank in the 16th century.

Vääpelis were traditionally responsible for much of the practical tasks in training conscripts and keeping them in line (often literally), in a manner similar to drill sergeant. They were the lowest rank of permanent salaried NCO and thus to a conscript, they were the first and most often encountered of career personnel. (In regular units, lower ranks were either conscripts or temporarily employed.) Obtaining the rank of vääpeli required completion of a degree from Päällystöopisto, a military junior college. Vääpelis were career NCOs and could be promoted to ylivääpeli and sotilasmestari, but not to commissioned officers; this would require attending the Finnish National Defence University.

== See also ==
- Finnish military ranks
