= Översergeant =

Finnish and Swedish military rank

- Army Navy
- Country: Sweden
- Service branch: Army; Navy
- Next higher rank: Fanjunkare; Löjtnant
- Next lower rank: Sergeant

Ylikersantti
- Army Navy
- Country: Finland
- Service branch: Army; Navy; Air Force; Border Guard
- NATO rank code: OR-6
- Next higher rank: Vääpeli (Fältväbel) Navy: Pursimies (Bootsmann)
- Next lower rank: Kersantti

Ylikersantti (Swedish: översergeant) is a Finnish military rank above kersantti (sergeant) and below vääpeli (fältväbel). The rank was introduced in the Swedish Armed Forces in 2019. It is above sergeant and below fanjunkare. Both sergeant and översergeant are OR6.

== Finland ==
Formerly the rank was mainly used by junior officers-in-reserve (with a reserve rank of at least vänrikki) working as temporary contractual personnel. This gave them seniority over conscript sergeants or officer cadets, but subordinated them to commissioned officers (with an active service rank of vänrikki or higher). However, currently it is either a reserve rank, or a rank available to professional NCOs.

== Sweden ==
The översergant has the same relative rank as the fänrik.

Promotion

Promotion to översergeant requires a minimum of two years in-grade as a sergeant.

Duties

Översergeanter are Specialist Officers at Skill Levels B (Intermediate) and C (Advanced). The översergeant typically serves as a squad leader or platoon sergeant.

== See also ==
- Finnish military ranks
