= Ranks and insignia of marine forces =

Commissioned officers' and enlisted rank comparison chart of all marine forces.

== Officers ==
Rank group	General/flag officers						Senior officers				Junior officers
Argentine Marines
Argentine Marines		Almirante IM	Vicealmirante IM	Contralmirante IM			Capitán de navío IM	Capitán de fragata IM		Capitán de corbeta IM	Teniente de navío IM		Teniente de fragata IM	Teniente de corbeta IM	Guardiamarina IM
Royal Bahamas Defence Force
Royal Bahamas Defence Force					Commodore		Captain	Senior commander	Commander	Lieutenant commander	Senior lieutenant	Lieutenant	Sub-lieutenant		Acting sub-lieutenant
Brazilian Marine Corps
Brazilian Marine Corps		Almirante-de-esquadra fuzileiro naval	Vice-almirante fuzileiro naval	Contra-almirante fuzileiro naval			Capitão-de-Mar-e-Guerra fuzileiro naval	Capitão-de-Fragata fuzileiro naval		Capitão-de-corveta fuzileiro naval	Capitão-tenente fuzileiro naval		Primeiro-tenente fuzileiro naval		Segundo-tenente fuzileiro naval
Republic of China Marine Corps
Republic of China Marine Corps		二級上將; Jī-kip siōng-chiòng	中將; Tiong-chiòng	少將; Siáu-chiòng			上校; Siōng-hāu	中校; Tiong-hāu		少校; Siáu-hāu	上尉; Siōng-ùi		中尉; Tiong-ùi		少尉; Siáu-ùi
Colombian Naval Infantry
Colombian Naval Infantry		General		Mayor general	Brigadier general		Coronel	Teniente coronel		Mayor	Capitán		Teniente		Subteniente
Ecuadorian Naval Infantry Corps
Ecuadorian Naval Infantry Corps		Almirante	Vicealmirante	Contralmirante			Capitán de navío	Capitán de fragata		Capitán de corbeta	Teniente de navío		Teniente de fragata		Alferez de fragata
Rank group	General/flag officers						Senior officers				Junior officers
Falkland Islands Defence Force
Falkland Islands Defence Force										Major	Captain		Lieutenant		Second lieutenant
Indonesian Marine Corps
Indonesian Marine Corps		Jenderal	Letnan jenderal	Mayor jenderal	Brigadir jenderal		Kolonel	Letnan kolonel		Mayor	Kapten		Letnan satu		Letnan dua
Iranian Navy
Iranian Navy		دریابد; Daryabod	دریاسالار; Daryasalar	دریابان; Daryaban	دریادار; Daryadar	دریادار دوم; Daryadar dovom	ناخدا یکم; Nakhoda yekom	ناخدا دوم; Nakhoda dovom		ناخدا سوم; Nakhoda sevom	ناوسروان; Navsarvan		ناوبان یکم; Navban yekom	ناوبان دوم; Navban dovom	ناوبان سوم; Navban sevom
Iranian Navy		Admiral	Vice admiral	Rear admiral	Flotilla admiral	Second flotilla admiral	Captain	Commander		Lieutenant Commander	Lieutenant		Lieutenant Junior Grade	Ensign	Ensign Junior Grade
Republic of Korea Marine Corps
Republic of Korea Marine Corps		대장; Daejang	중장; Jungjang	소장; Sojang	준장; Junjang		대령; Daeryeong	중령; Jungnyeong		소령; Soryeong	대위; Daewi		중위; Jungwi		소위; Sowi
Maldives Marine Corps
Maldives Marine Corps		ޖެނެރަލް Jeneral	ލެފްޓިނަންޓް ޖެނެރަލް Leftinant jeneral	މޭޖަރ ޖެނެރަލް Meyjar jeneral	ބްރިގޭޑިއަރ ޖެނެރަލް Brigeydiar jeneral		ކާނަލް Kaanal	ލެފްޓިނަންޓް ކާނަލް Leftinant kaanal		މޭޖަރ; Meyjar	ކެޕްޓަން Keptan		ފަސްޓް ލެފްޓިނަންޓް Fast leftinant		ލެފްޓިނަންޓް Leftinant
Namibian Marine Corps
Namibian Marine Corps							Marine Commandant	Commander		Lieutenant commander	Lieutenant		Lieutenant (junior grade)		Ensign
Netherlands Marine Corps
Netherlands Marine Corps		Generaal	Lieutenant-generaal	Generaal-majoor	Brigade-generaal		Kolonel	Lieutenant-kolonel		Majoor	Kapitein		1e Luitenant		2e Luitenant
Rank group	General/flag officers						Senior officers				Junior officers
Pakistan Marines
Pakistan Marines			Vice admiral	Rear admiral	Commodore		Captain	Commander		Lieutenant commander	Lieutenant		Sub-lieutenant		Midshipman
Philippine Marine Corps
Philippine Marine Corps		General	Lieutenant general	Major general	Brigadier general		Colonel	Lieutenant colonel		Major	Captain		First lieutenant		Second lieutenant
Russian Navy
Russian Navy		Адмирал флота Admiral flota	Адмирал; Admiral	Вице-адмирал; Vitse-admiral	Контр-адмирал; Contre-admiral		Капитан 1-го ранга Kapitan 1-go ranga	Капитан 2-го ранга Kapitan 2-go ranga		Капитан 3-го ранга Kapitan 3-go ranga	Капитан-лейтенант; Kapitan-leytenant		Старший лейтенант Starshiy leytenant	Лейтенант; Leytenant	Младший лейтенант Mladshiy leytenant
Spanish Marine Infantry
Spanish Marine Infantry			Teniente general	General de división	General de brigada		Coronel	Teniente coronel		Comandante	Capitán		Teniente		Alférez
(Sweden) Swedish Amphibious Corps
(Sweden) Swedish Amphibious Corps		General	Generallöjtnant	Generalmajor	Brigadgeneral		Överste	Överstelöjtnant		Major	Kapten		Löjtnant		Fänrik
Royal Thai Navy
Royal Thai Navy	จอมพลเรือ; Chom phon ruea	พลเรือเอก; Phon ruea ek	พลเรือโท; Phon ruea tho	พลเรือตรี Phon ruea tri			นาวาเอก; Nawa ek	นาวาโท; Nawa tho		นาวาตรี Nawa tri	เรือเอก; Ruea ek		เรือโท; Ruea tho		เรือตรี Ruea tri
Ukrainian Marine Corps
Ukrainian Marine Corps		Генерал; Heneral	Генерал-лейтенант; Heneral-leytenant	Генерал-майор; Heneral-mayor	Бригадний генерал Bryhadnyy heneral		Полковник; Polkovnyk	Підполковник; Pidpolkovnyk		Майор; Mayor	Капітан; Kapitan		Старший лейтенант Starshyy leytenant	Лейтенант; Leytenant	Молодший лейтенант Molodshyy leytenant
Royal Marines
Royal Marines	Captain General; Royal Marines	General	Lieutenant-general	Major-general	Brigadier		Colonel	Lieutenant colonel		Major	Captain		Lieutenant		Second lieutenant
United States Marine Corps
United States Marine Corps		General	Lieutenant general	Major general	Brigadier general		Colonel	Lieutenant colonel		Major	Captain		First lieutenant		Second lieutenant
Rank group	General/flag officers						Senior officers				Junior officers

== Warrant officers ==
Warrant Officers (WO) and Chief Warrant Officers (CWO) in the US Military rank below officers but above officer candidates and enlisted servicemen. The first warrant officer rank, WO1 does not have a "commission" associated with it, instead having a "Warrant" from the Secretary of the Army. Warrant officers are allowed the same courtesies as a commissioned officer, but may have some restrictions on their duties that are reserved for commissioned officers. Warrant officers usually receive a commission once they are promoted to Chief Warrant Officer 2 (CW2), but are usually not referred to as "commissioned officers". WO1s may be and sometimes are appointed by commission as stated in title 10USC.

Equivalent NATO rank	WO-5	WO-4	WO-3	WO-2	WO-1
Republic of China Marine Corps
Republic of China Marine Corps					Warrant Officer (纯尉; Chunwèi)
Republic of Korea Marine Corps
Republic of Korea Marine Corps					Jun-wi 준위; Warrant Officer
Maldivian Marine Corps
Maldivian Marine Corps	Chief warrant officer	Warrant officer grade 4	Warrant officer grade 3	Warrant officer grade 2	Warrant officer grade 1
United States Marine Corps
United States Marine Corps	Chief warrant officer 5	Chief warrant officer 4	Chief warrant officer 3	Chief warrant officer 2	Warrant officer 1
NATO rank	WO-5	WO-4	WO-3	WO-2	WO-1

== Enlisted ==
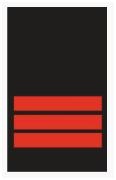
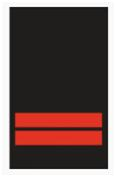
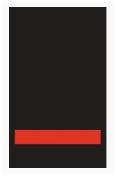
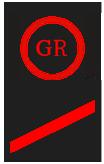
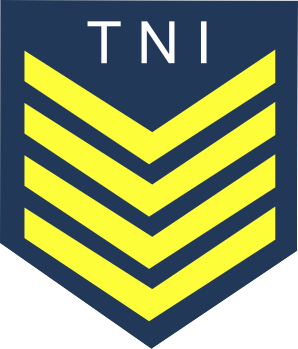
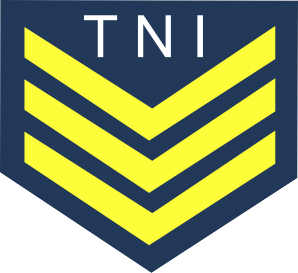
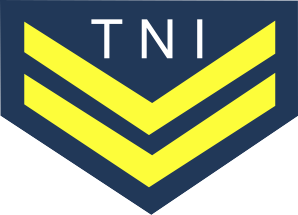
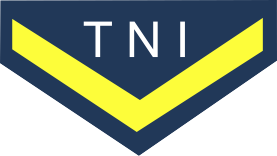
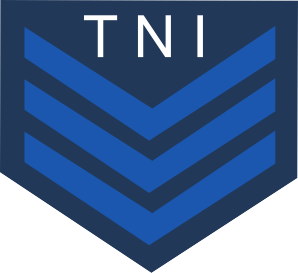
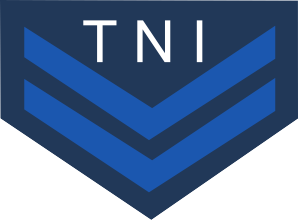
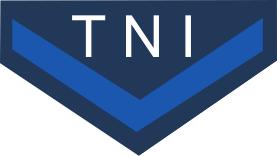
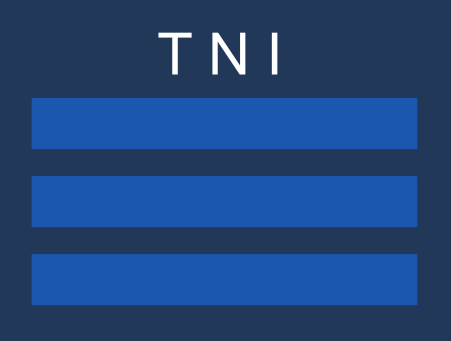
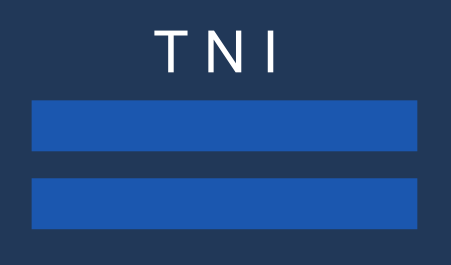
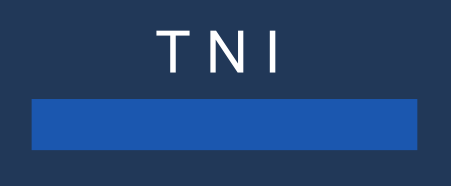
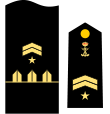
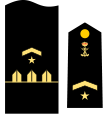
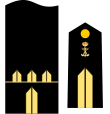
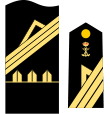
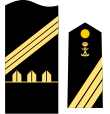
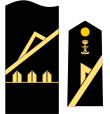
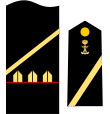
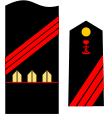
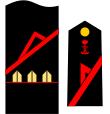
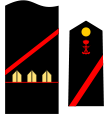
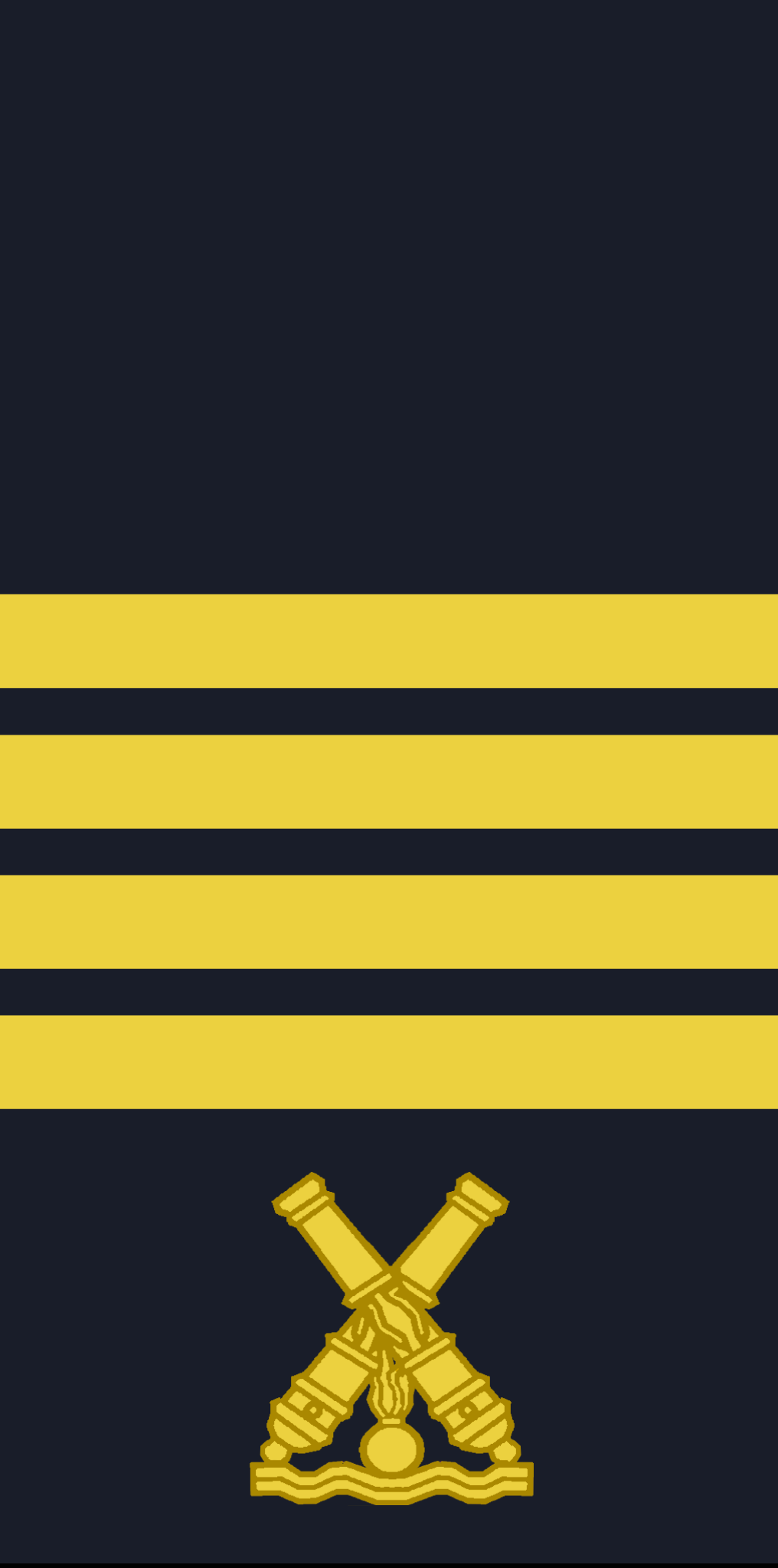
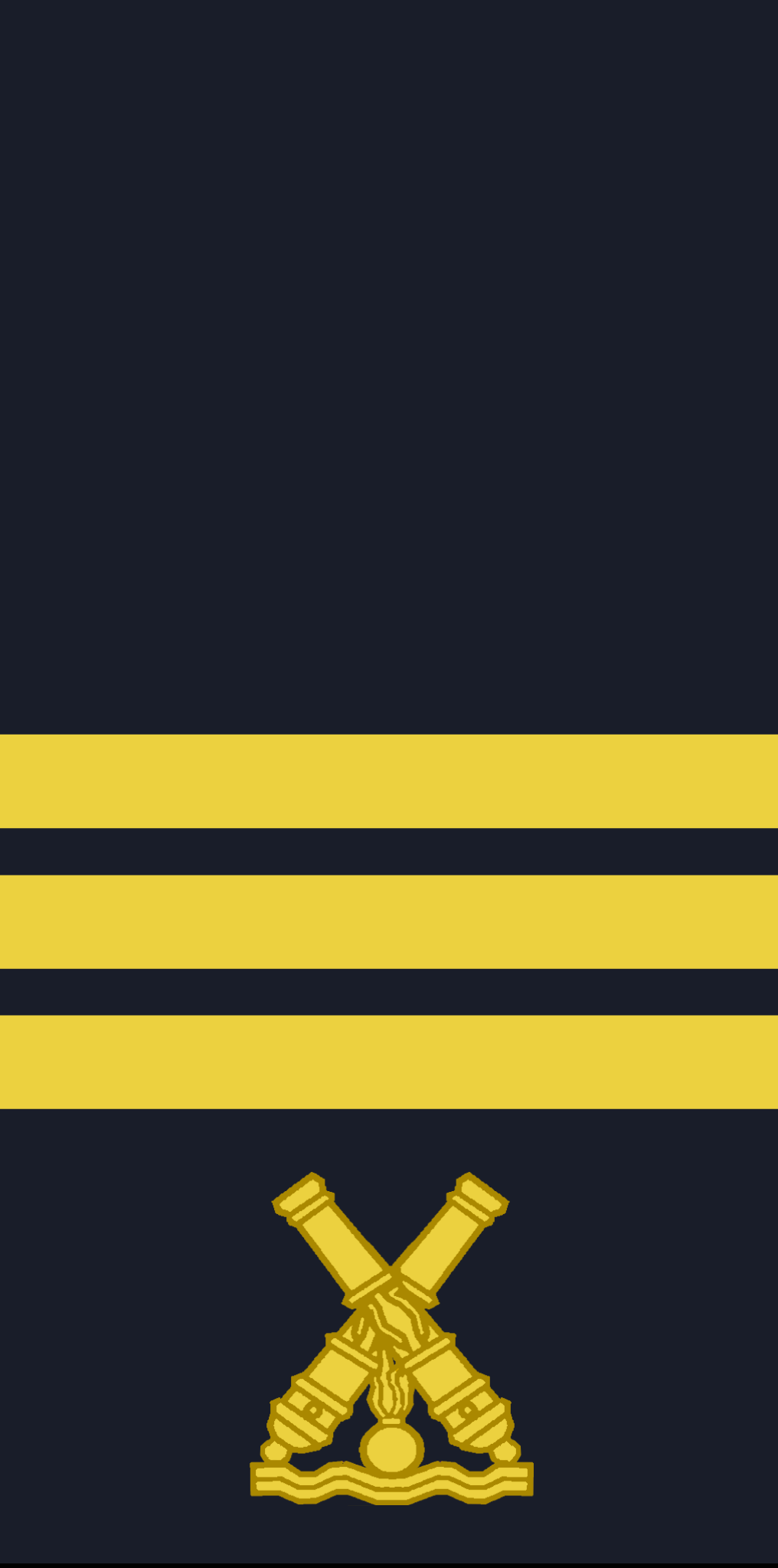
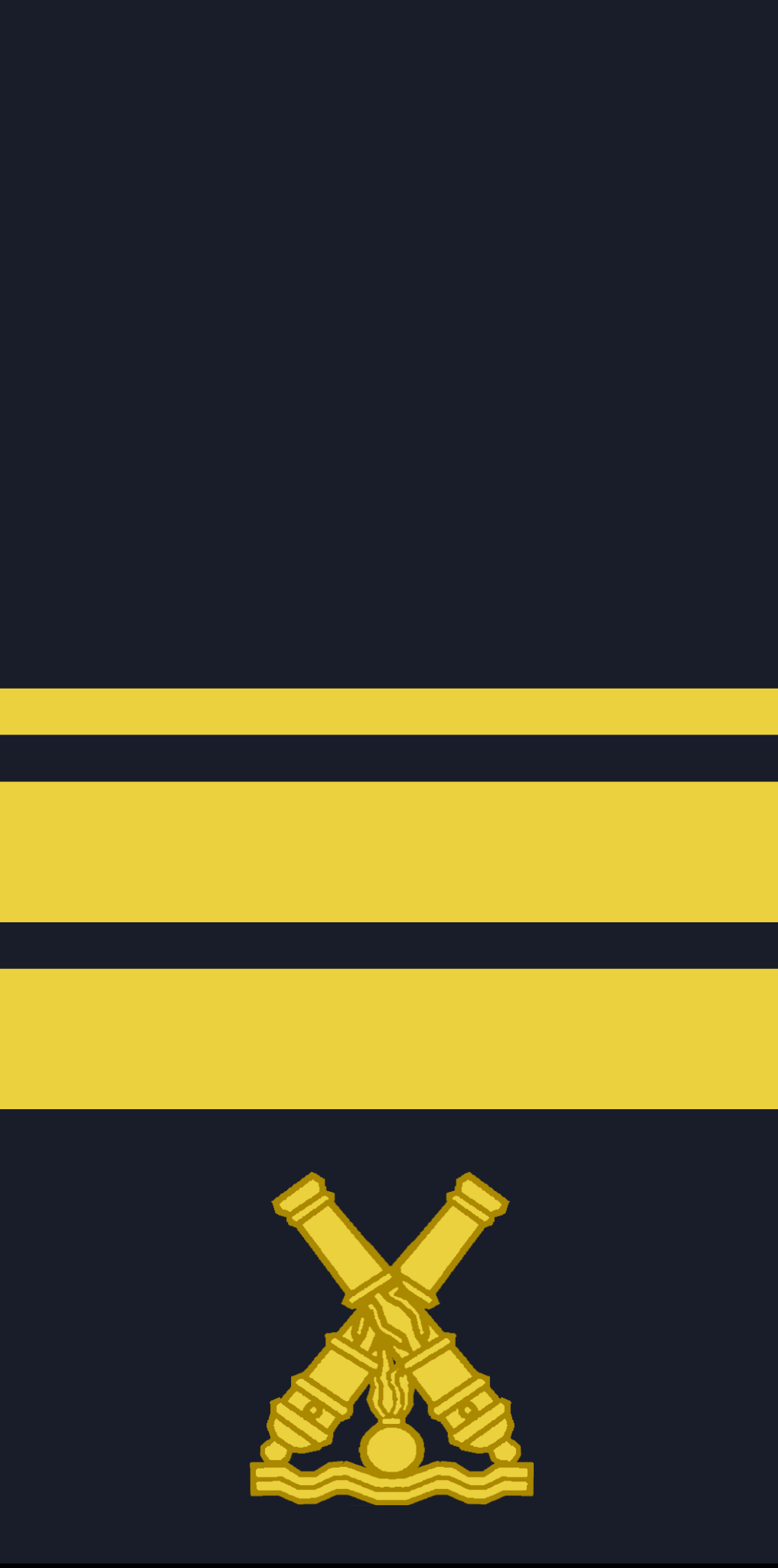
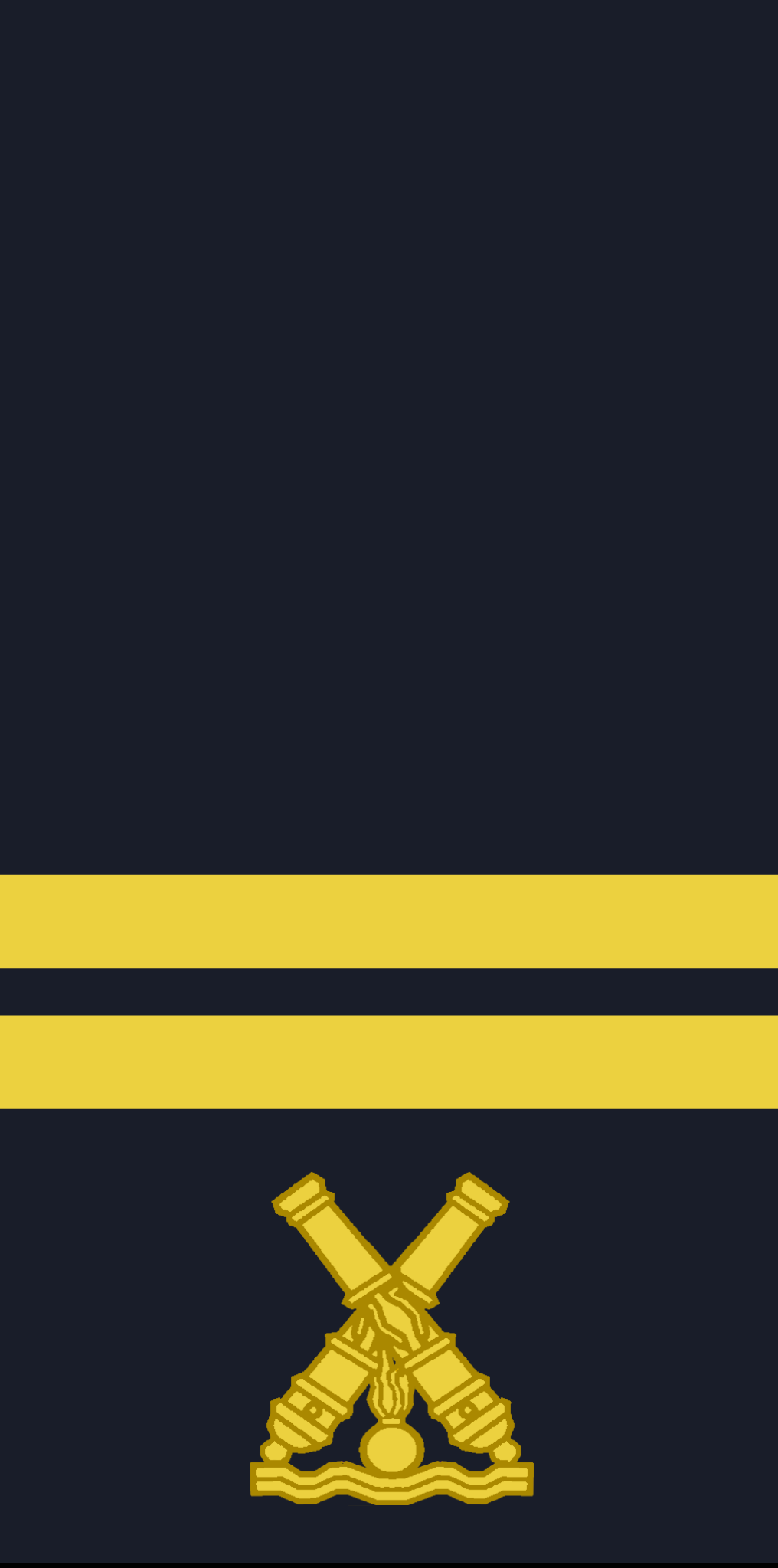
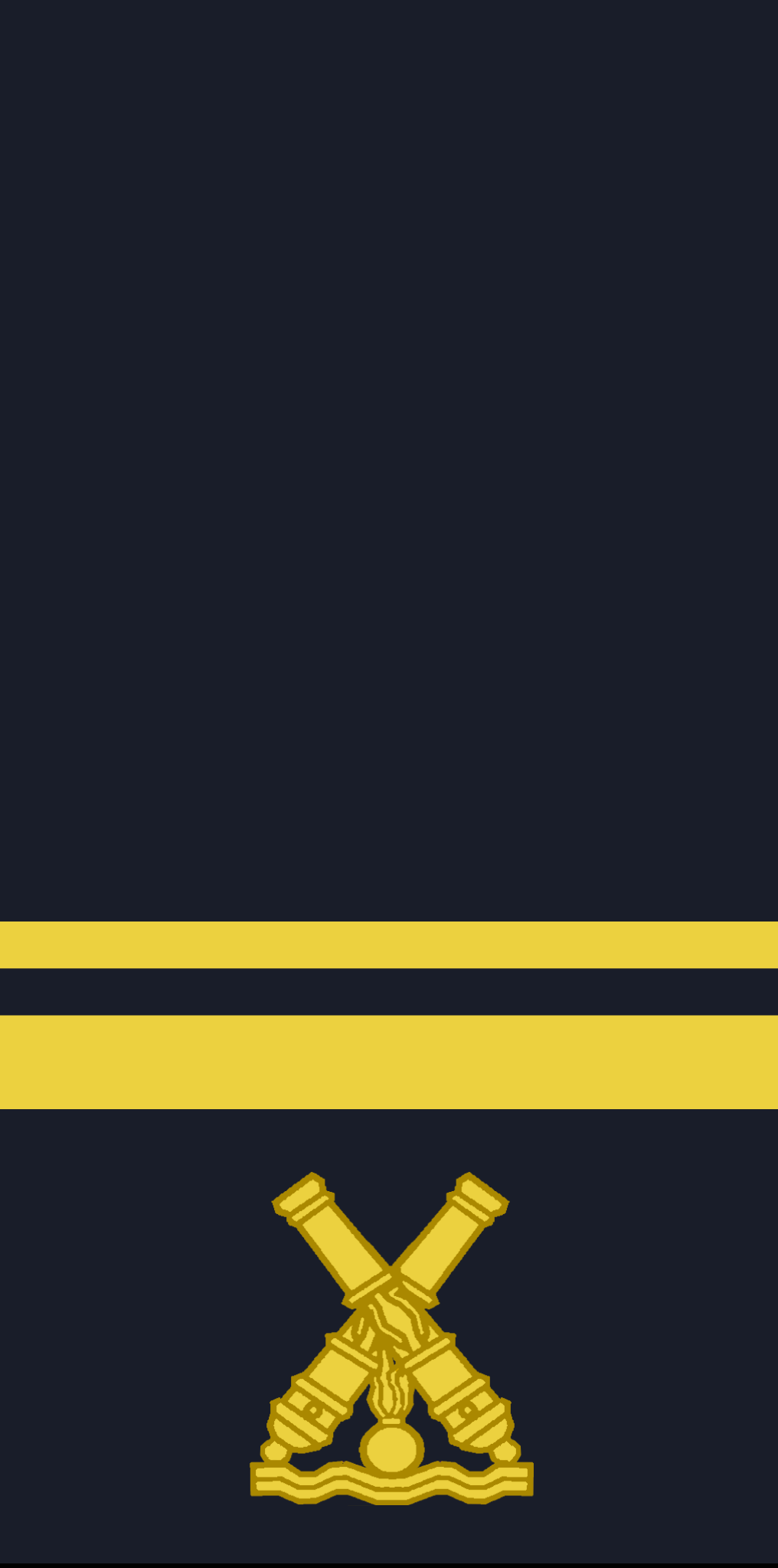
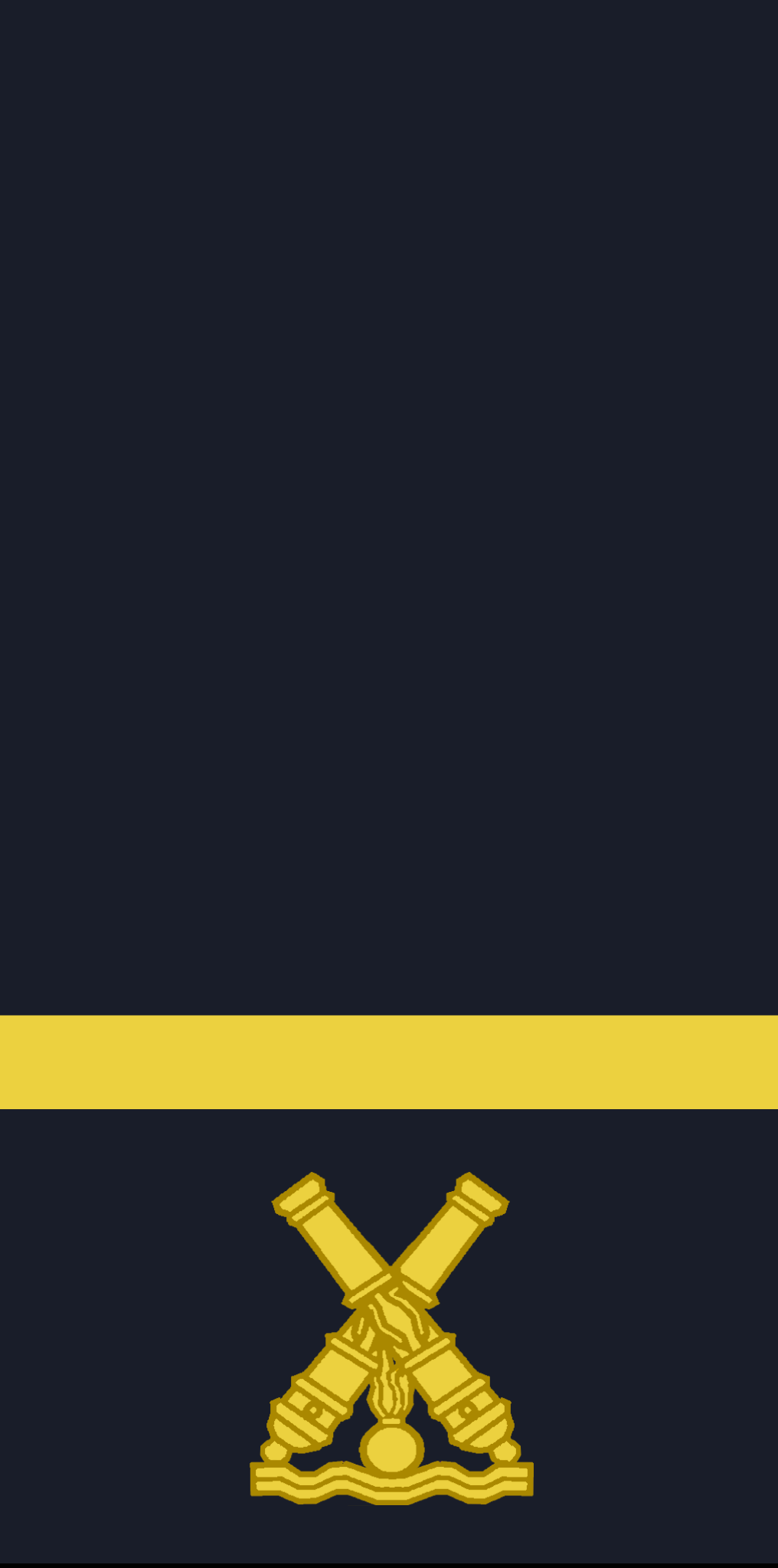
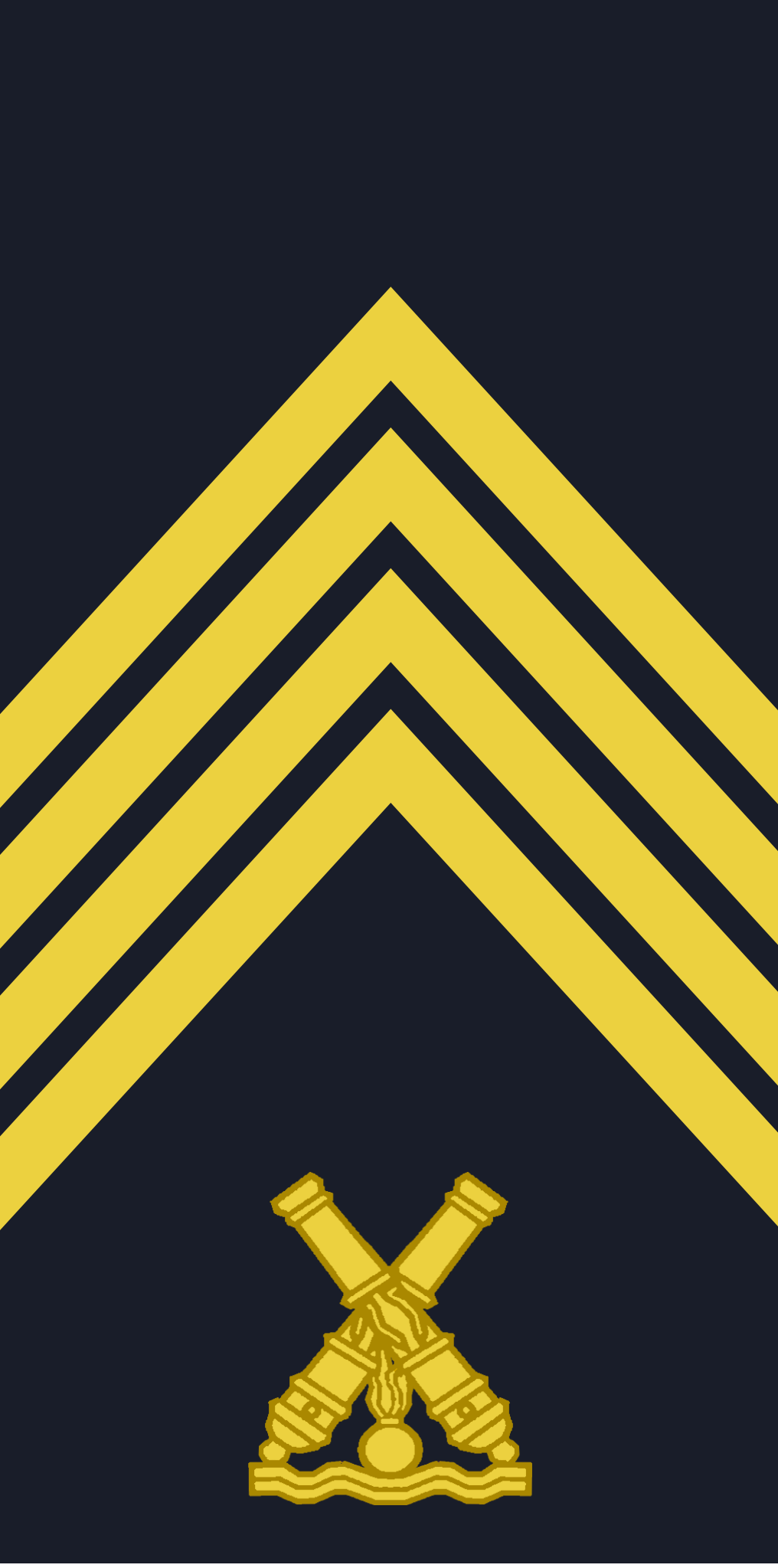
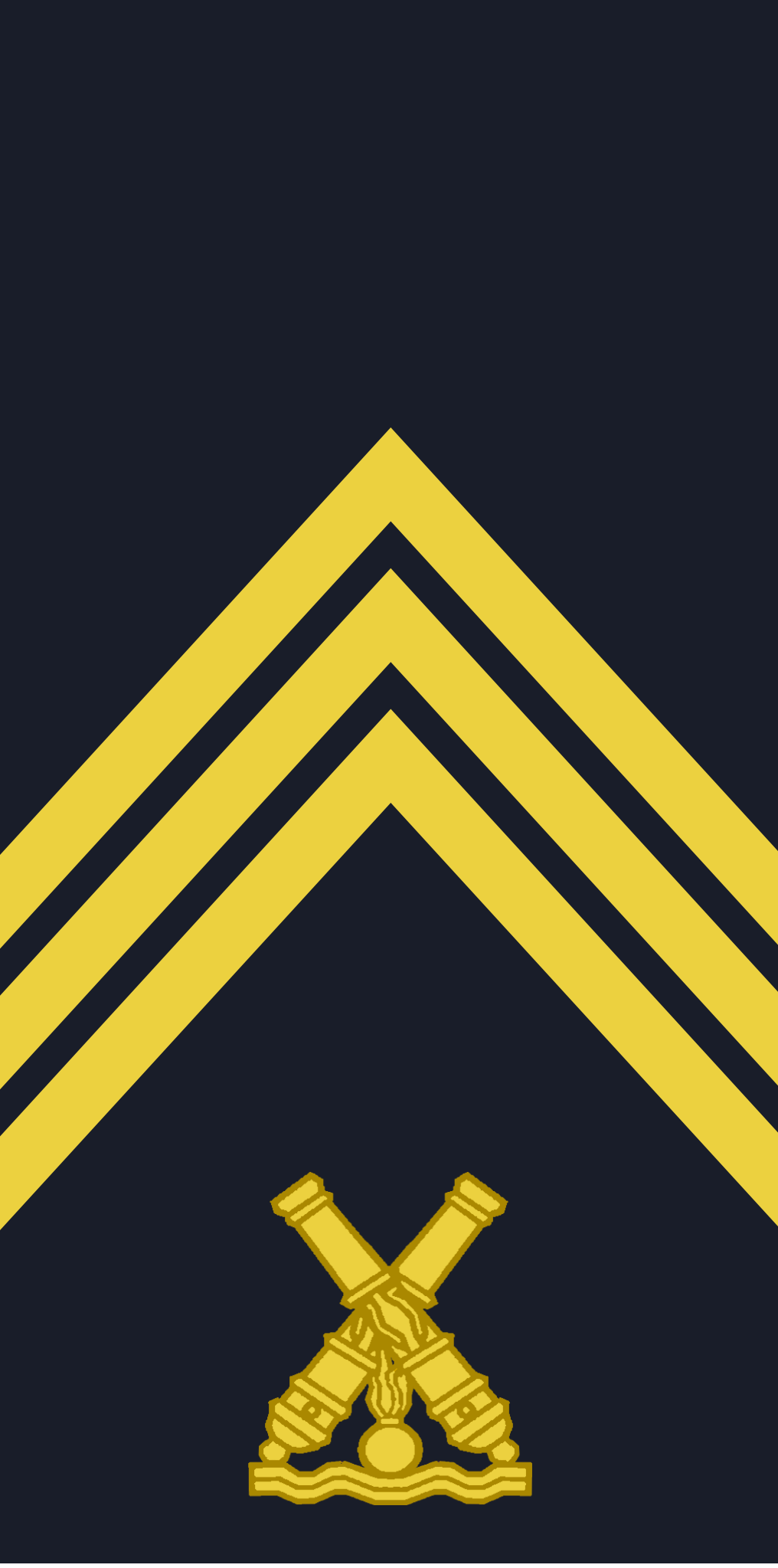
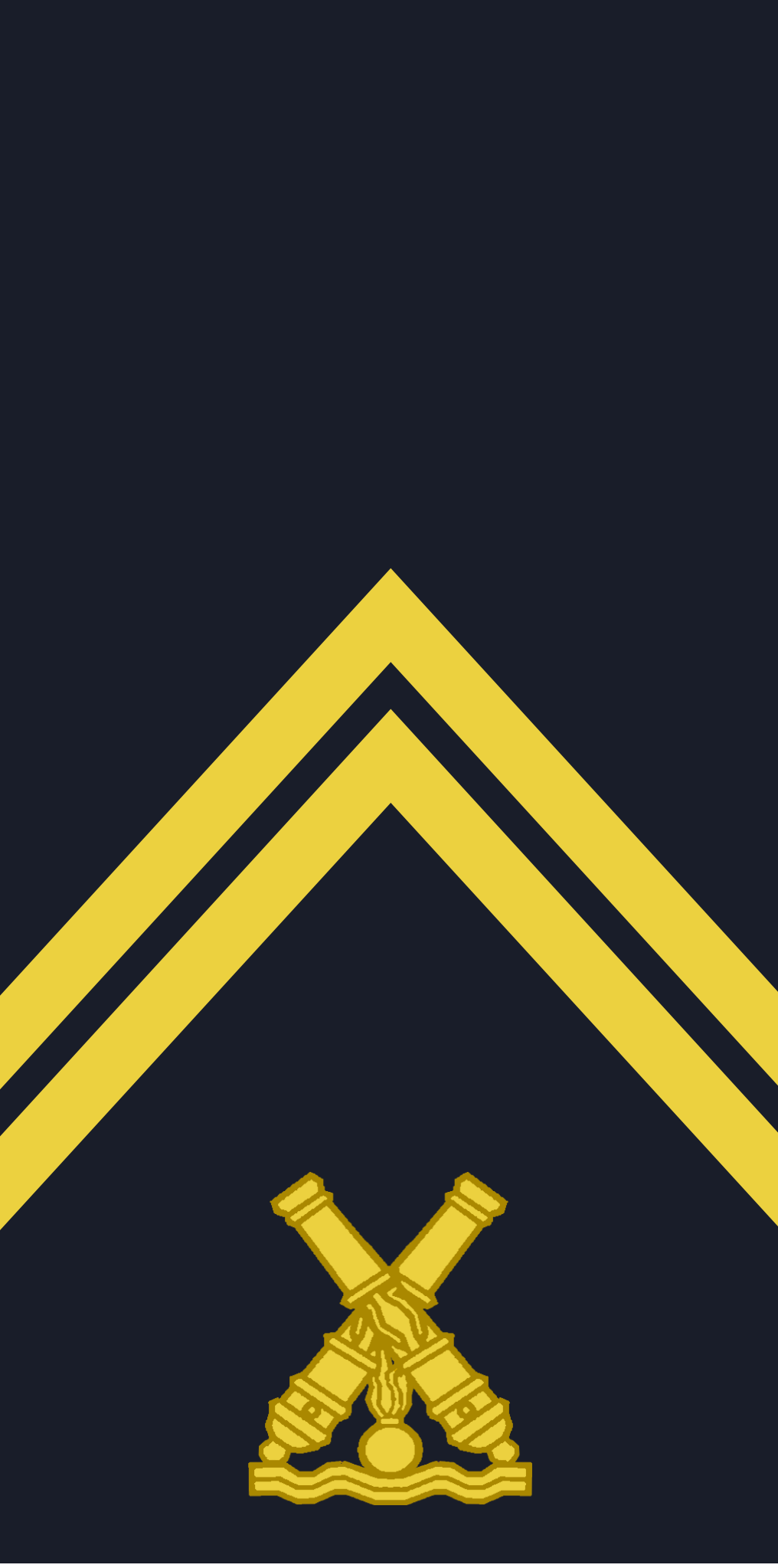
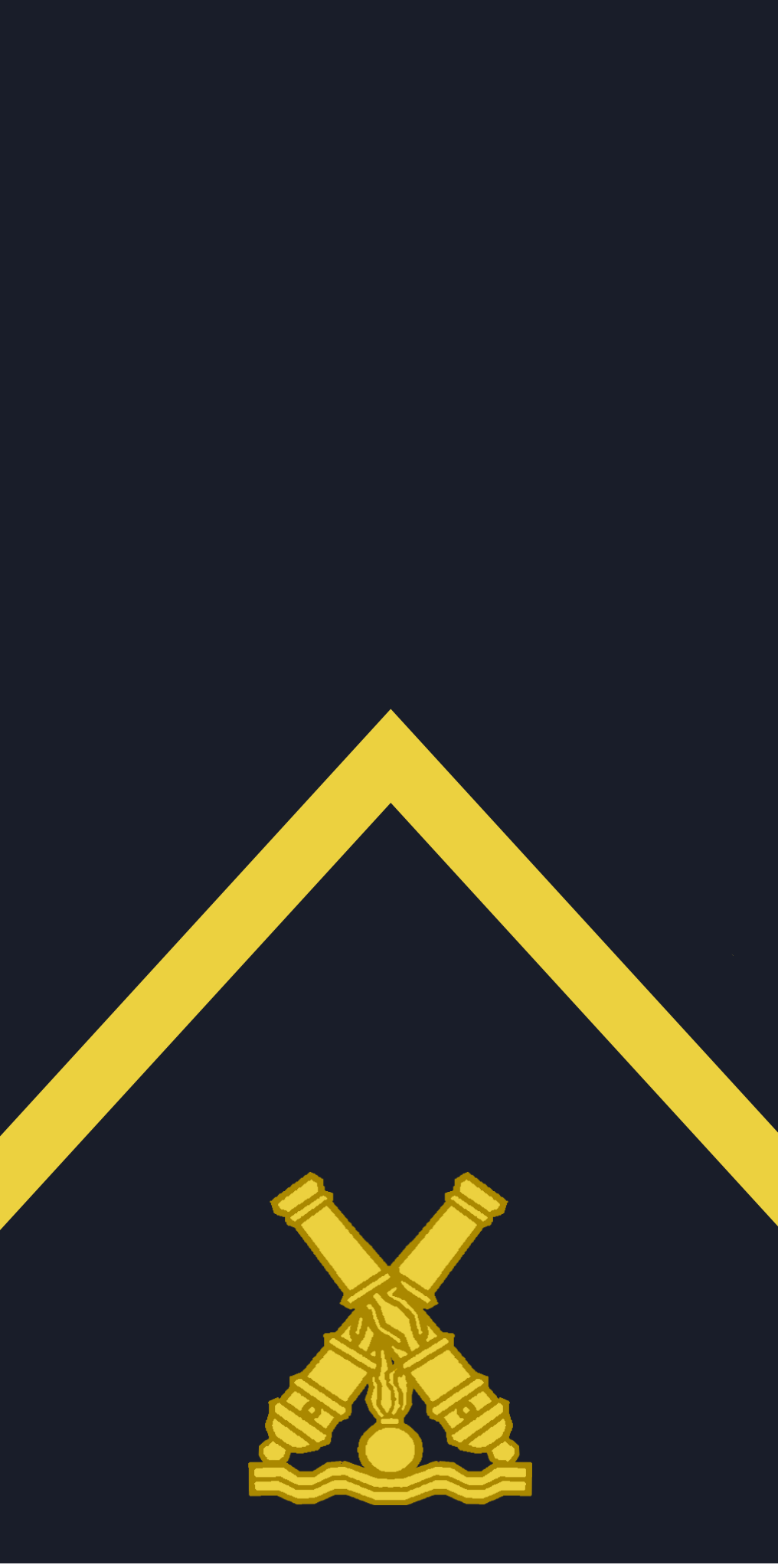
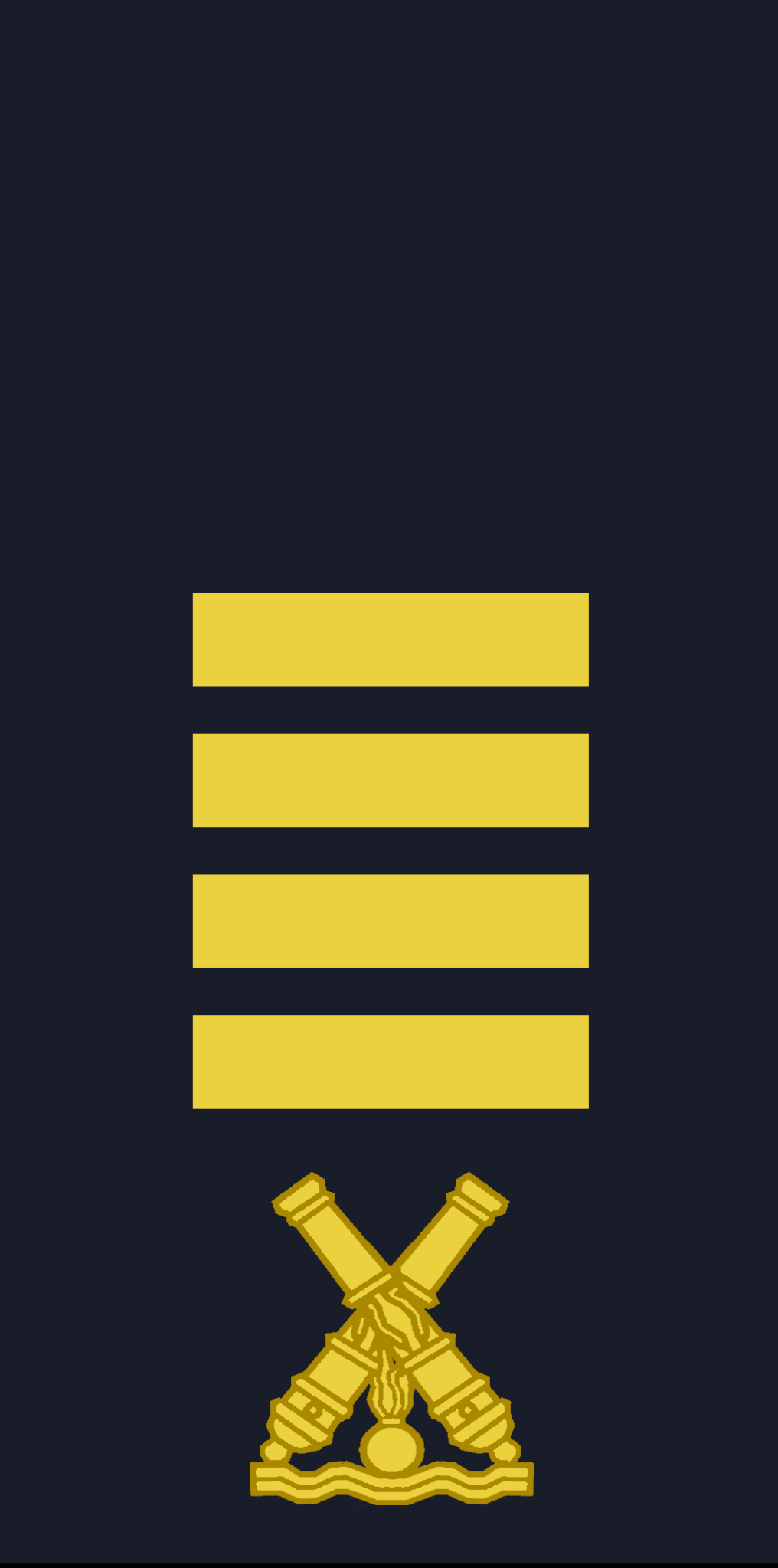
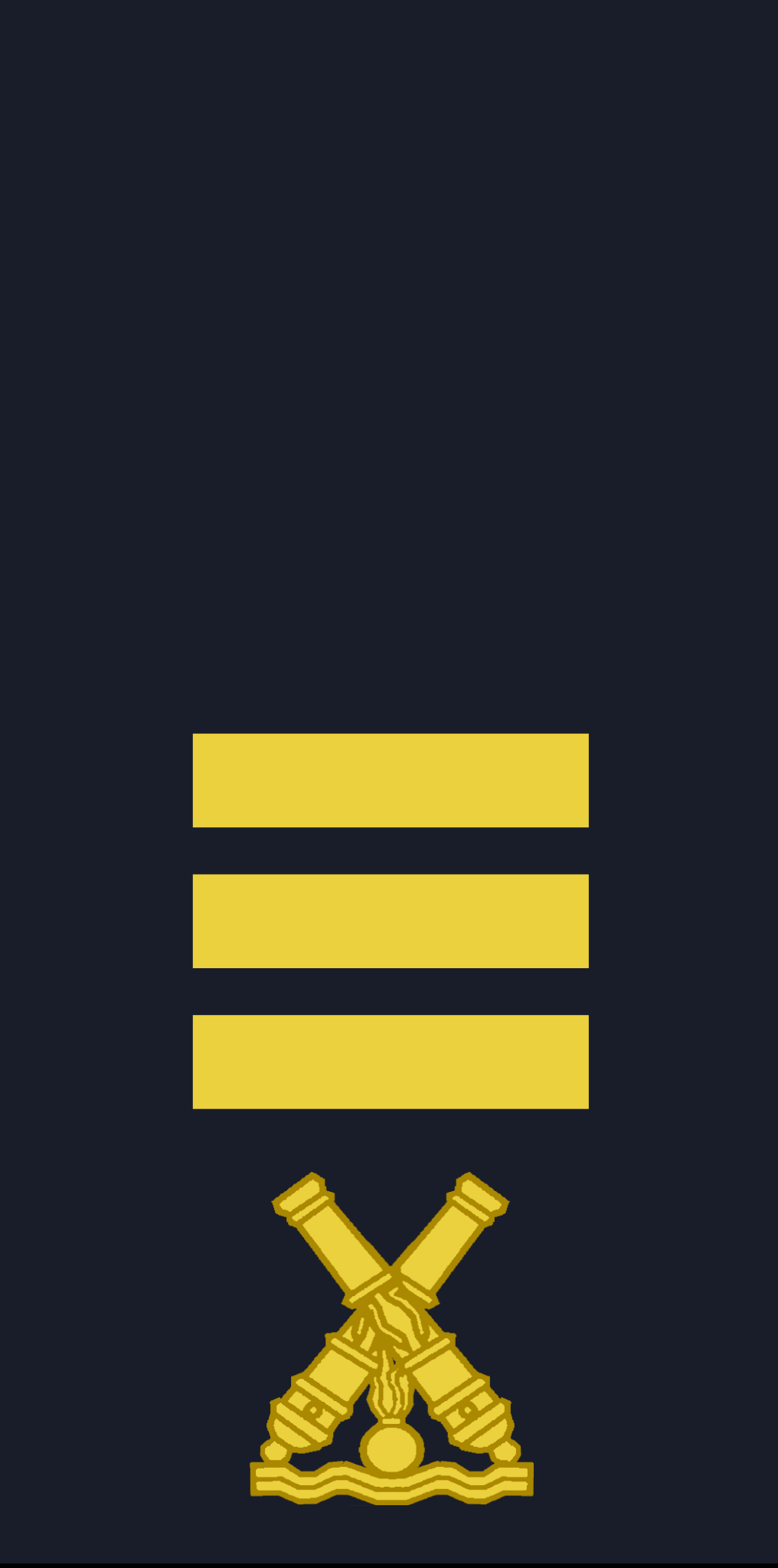
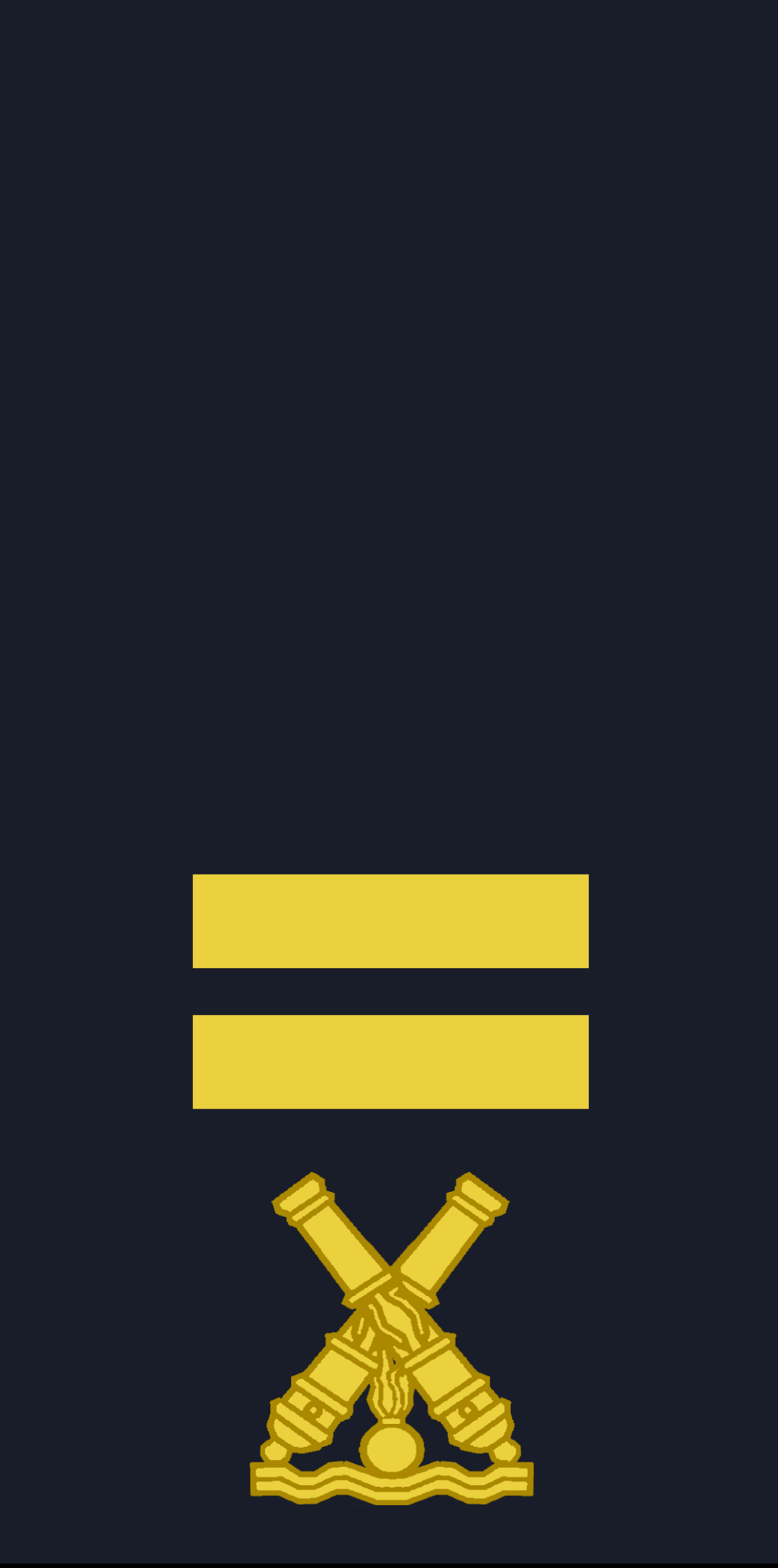
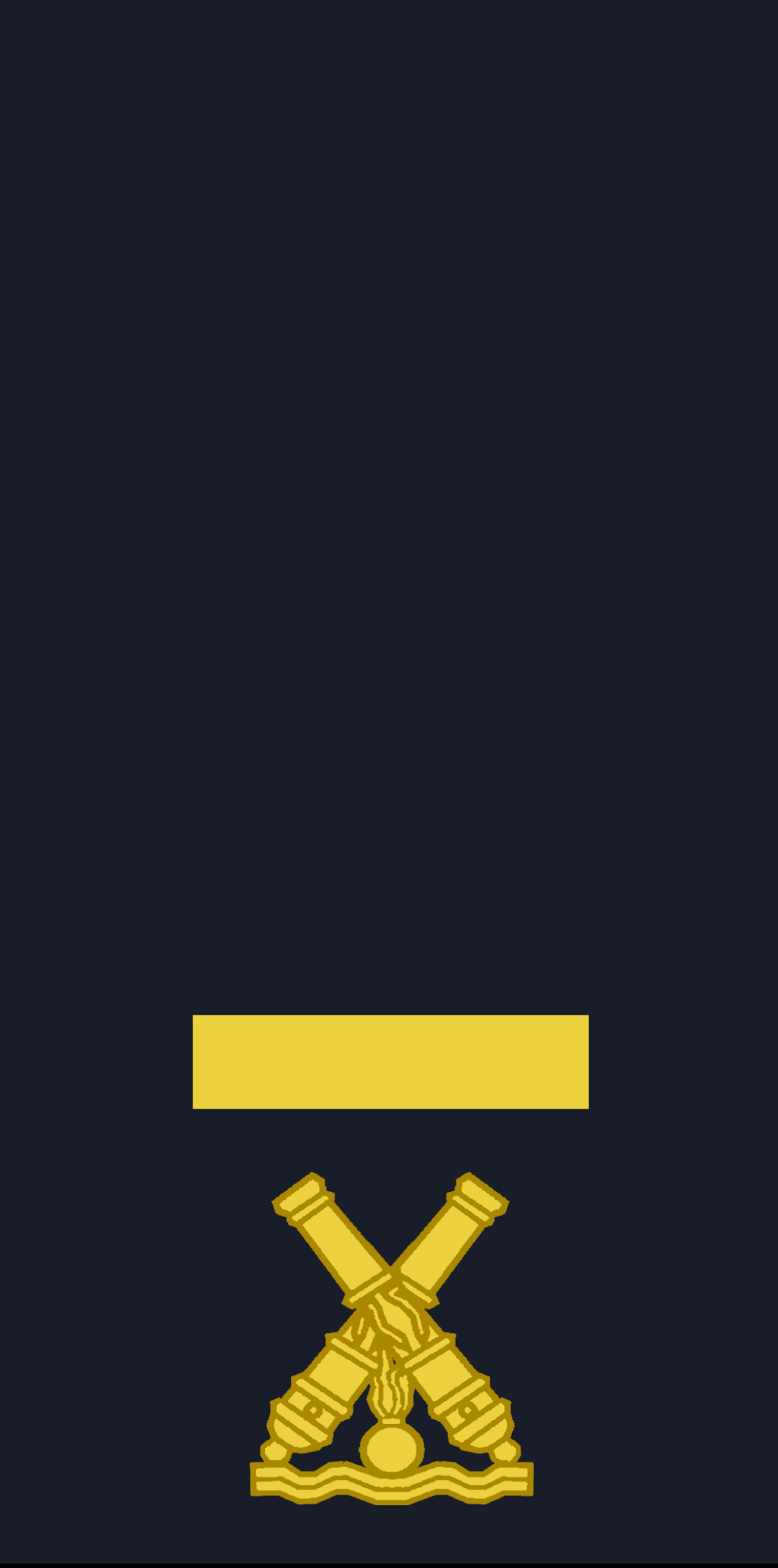
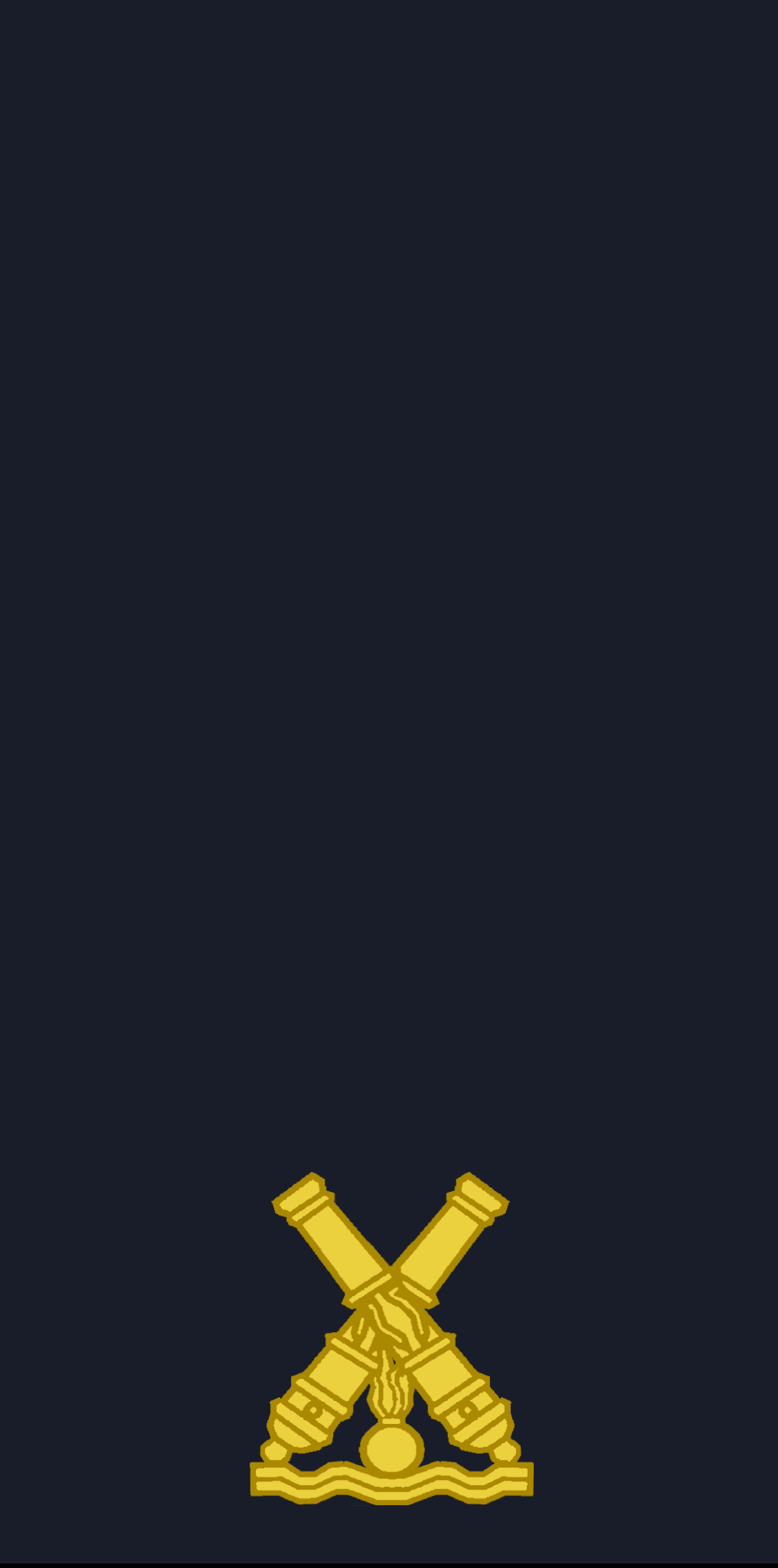
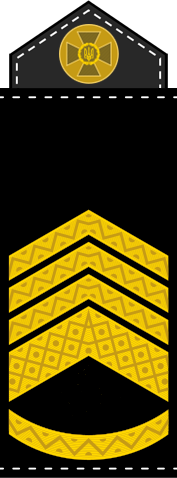
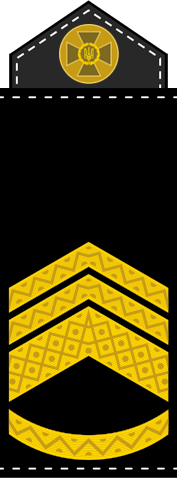
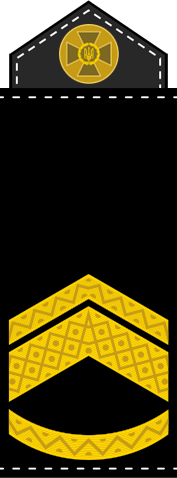
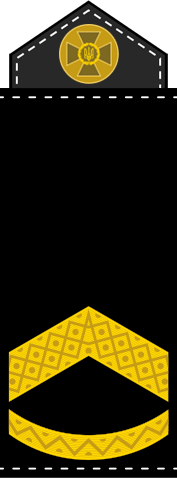
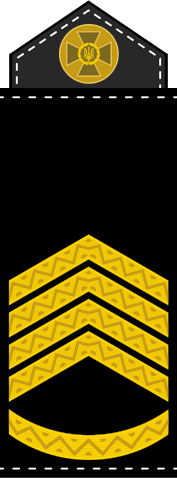
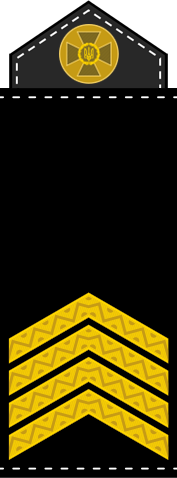
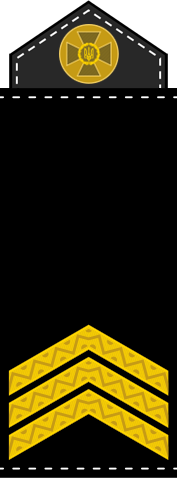
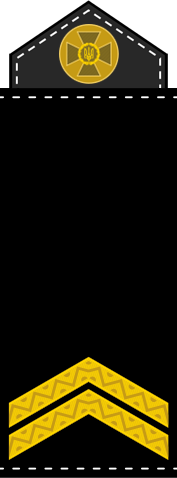
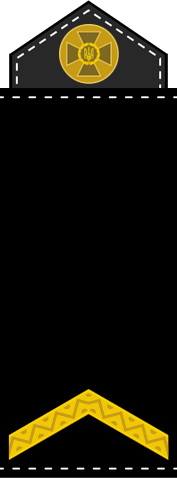
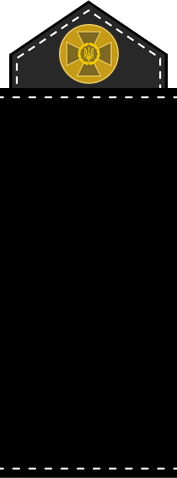
Rank group	Senior NCOs											Junior NCOs			Enlisted
Argentine Marines
Argentine Marines	Suboficial mayor			Suboficial principal		Suboficial primero		Suboficial segundo		Cabo principal IM		Cabo primero IM		Cabo segundo IM	Infantería de Marina primero				Infantería de Marina segundo
Royal Bahamas Defence Force																			No insignia
Royal Bahamas Defence Force	Force chief petty officer					Chief petty officer		Petty officer				Leading marine			Able marine				Marine
Brazilian Marine Corps
Brazilian Marine Corps	Suboficial fuzileiro naval							Primeiro-sargento fuzileiro naval		Segundo-sargento fuzileiro naval	Terceiro-sargento fuzileiro naval	Cabo fuzileiro naval			Soldado fuzileiro naval
Colombian Naval Infantry																			No insignia
Colombian Naval Infantry	Sargento mayor de comando conjunto		Sargento mayor de comando	Sargento mayor		Sargento primero		Sargento vice primero		Sargento segundo		Cabo primero		Cabo segundo	Cabo tercero				Infante regular
Republic of China Marine Corps
Republic of China Marine Corps	一等士官長; Yīděng shìguānzhǎng			二等士官長; Èrděng shìguānzhǎng		三等士官長; Sānděng shìguānzhǎng		上士; Shàngshì		中士; Zhōngshì		下士; Xiàshì		上等兵; Shàngděngbīng	一等兵; Yīděngbīng				二等兵; Èrděngbīng
Ecuadorian Naval Infantry Corps
Ecuadorian Naval Infantry Corps	Sub-oficial mayor		Sub-oficial primero	Sub-oficial segundo		Sargento primero				Sargento segundo		Cabo primero		Cabo segundo	Marinero				Grumete 2do año	Grumete 1er año
Rank group	Senior NCOs											Junior NCOs			Enlisted
Falkland Islands Defence Force															No insignia
Falkland Islands Defence Force				Warrant officer class 2 (Permanent staff instructor)		Colour sergeant		Sergeant				Corporal		Lance corporal	Private
Indonesian Marine Corps
Indonesian Marine Corps	Pembantu letnan satu		Pembantu letnan dua	Sersan mayor		Sersan kepala		Sersan satu		Sersan dua		Kopral kepala	Kopral satu	Kopral dua	Prajurit kepala		Prajurit satu		Prajurit dua
Republic of Korea Marine Corps
Republic of Korea Marine Corps	원사; Wonsa			상사; Sangsa		중사; Jungsa		하사; Hasa		병장; Byeongjang		상등병; Sangdeungbyeong		일등병; Ildeungbyeong	이등병; Ideungbyeong
Maldives Marine Corps																			No insignia
Maldives Marine Corps	ސާރޖަންޓް މޭޖަރ އޮފް އެމްއެންޑީއެފް Saarjant meyjar of emendeeef	ކޮމާންޑް ސާރޖަންޓް މޭޖަރ; Komaand saarjant meyjar	ސާރޖަންޓް މޭޖަރ; Saarjant meyjar	ފަސްޓް ސާރޖަންޓް Fast saarjant		ސާރޖަންޓް ފަސްޓް ކްލާސް Saarjant fast klaas		ސްޓާފް ސާރޖަންޓް Staaf saarjant		ސާރޖަންޓް Saarjant		ކޯޕްރަލް Koapral		ލާންސް ކޯޕްރަލް Laans koapral					ޕްރައިވެޓް Praivet
Namibian Marine Corps															No insignia
Namibian Marine Corps	Warrant officer class 1			Warrant officer class 2		Chief petty officer		Petty officer				Leading seaman		Able seaman	Seaman
Netherlands Marine Corps																			No insignia
Netherlands Marine Corps	Adjudant-onderofficier					Sergeant-majoor		Sergeant				Korporaal			Marinier der 1e klasse		Marinier der 2e klasse		Marinier der 3e klasse
Rank group	Senior NCOs											Junior NCOs			Enlisted
Pakistan Marines																			No insignia
Pakistan Marines	Master Chief Petty Officer			Fleet Chief Petty Officer		Chief Petty Officer		Petty Officer				Leading Seaman			Able Tech-I				Ordinary Tech-II
Philippine Marine Corps
Philippine Marine Corps	Chief master sergeant		Senior master sergeant	Master sergeant		Technical sergeant		Staff sergeant		Sergeant		Corporal			Private first class				Private
Russian Navy
Russian Navy	Старший мичман Starshy michman		Мичман; Michman	Главный корабельный старшина Glavny korabelny starshina		Главный старшина Glavny starshina		Старшина 1 статьи Starshina 1 statji		Старшина 2 статьи Starshina 2 statji		Старший матрос Starshy matros		Матрос; Matros
Spanish Marine Infantry
Spanish Marine Infantry	Suboficial mayor		Subteniente	Brigada		Sargento primero		Sargento		Cabo mayor		Cabo primero		Cabo	Soldado de primera				Soldado
(Sweden) Swedish Amphibious Corps
(Sweden) Swedish Amphibious Corps	Regementsförvaltare			Förvaltare		Överfanjunkare	Fanjunkare	Översergeant	Sergeant	Överfurir	Furir	Korpral		Vicekorpral	Menig 4	Menig 3	Menig 2	Menig 1	Menig
Royal Thai Navy																			No insignia
Royal Thai Navy	พันจ่าเอก; Phan cha ek			พันจ่าโท; Phan cha tho		พันจ่าตรี Phan cha tri				จ่าเอก; Cha ek		จ่าโท; Cha tho		จ่าตรี Cha tri					พลทหาร; Phon thahan
Ukrainian Marine Corps
Ukrainian Marine Corps	Головний майстер-сержант Holovnyy mayster-serzhant		Старший майстер-сержант Starshyy mayster-serzhant	Майстер-сержант; Mayster-serzhant		Штаб-сержант; Shtab-serzhant		Головний сержант Holovnyy serzhant		Старший сержант Starshyy serzhant		Сержант; Serzhant		Молодший сержант Molodshyy serzhant	Старший солдат Starshyy soldat				Солдат; Soldat
Royal Marines															No insignia
Royal Marines	Warrant officer class 1			Warrant officer class 2		Colour sergeant		Sergeant				Corporal		Lance corporal	Marine
United States Marine Corps																			No insignia
United States Marine Corps	Sergeant major		Master gunnery sergeant	First sergeant	Master sergeant	Gunnery sergeant		Staff sergeant		Sergeant		Corporal		Lance corporal	Private first class				Private
Rank group	Senior NCOs											Junior NCOs			Enlisted

== See also ==
- Ranks and insignia of NATO
- Ranks and insignia of NATO armies enlisted
- Ranks and insignia of NATO armies officers
- Ranks and insignia of NATO air forces enlisted
- Ranks and insignia of NATO air forces officers
- Ranks and insignia of NATO navies enlisted
- Ranks and insignia of NATO navies officers
