= MNDF Marine Corps =

Marine Corps
- MNDF Marine Corps flag
- Founded: 2006
- Country: Maldives
- Type: Marines
- Role: Amphibious warfare Close-quarters combat Counter-insurgency; Counter-terrorism; Ground warfare Jungle warfare Maneuver warfare Raiding; Rapid Reaction Force; Reconnaissance; Special forces support
- Part of: Maldives National Defence Force

Commanders
- Commandant: Brigadier General Abdulla Zuhury
- Principal Director: Colonel Hassan Bushry

The MNDF Marine Corps are the frontline ground combat force of the Maldives National Defence Force, formed in 2006. The Marine Corps (formerly known as Rapid Reaction Force) were established at various strategic locations and vulnerable areas to enhance the force projection to provide their services throughout the country.

== History ==
The former infantry-oriented rapid reaction force was transformed into the Marine Corps under the new direction considering the archipelagic and maritime nature of the country, and to that effect having felt the need to incorporate marine tactics into the force which largely cater for amphibious and rapid deployment capabilities. The Marine Corps is trained and equipped to project its combat power through sea by its inherent rapid deployable capabilities and to fight in all types of weather and terrain in the country including urban terrain.

== Structure ==
It is structured into Marine Deployment Units (MDUs) which is centered on an infantry organization and acts as force projection elements of the MNDF by closely working with the Coast Guard. MDUs are currently being deployed in all the Area Commands of the MNDF. Some of these MDUs have armored detachments consisting of armored personnel carriers and infantry fighting vehicles which provide armor protection and mobility to ground combat troops.

The Marine Corps is headed by the Commandant of the Marine Corps who holds the rank of a Brigadier General. The Commandant is responsible for administration, readiness, training and discipline of the force. Hence, he formulates policy on these aspects in consultation with the Chief of Defence Force and the Vice Chief of Defence Force and with the civil leadership. The Commandant does not have the operational command authority over the Marine Corps. The administrative duties of the force such as organizing, equipping, posting, assigning and so forth are discharged through the Principal Director of the Marine Corps.

== Task ==
The primary task of the Marine Corps is to protect the land territory of the Maldives by defending critical infrastructure and key installations, and to act as a standby force for contingency operations. In addition to defensive roles, the offensive operational tasks of the Marine Corps include zone reconnaissance, amphibious assaults, securing beachheads, exploiting breakthroughs, close-quarter combat, and other combined-arms operations.

MNDF marines undergo an annual cycle of infantry-oriented, amphibious training. This routine involves physical conditioning and instruction in Marine Corps tactics, techniques, and procedures, with the objective of preparing units for combat operations within the Maldivian environment.

== Functions ==
The Marine Corps is composed of Marine Deployment Units (MDUs). They are deployed for the purpose of maintaining security in their key areas of responsibility and their operational conduct involves:

- Assistance to Coast Guard in maritime operations.
- Assistance to Civil Authorities at times of crisis.
- Search and Rescue operations.
- Providing Key Point guards.
- Undertaking combat operations.
- Conducting counter insurgency.
- Carrying out counter terrorism operations.

The Marine Corps is often assigned to non-combat missions such as providing humanitarian assistance and disaster relief operations.
