= Regementsförvaltare =

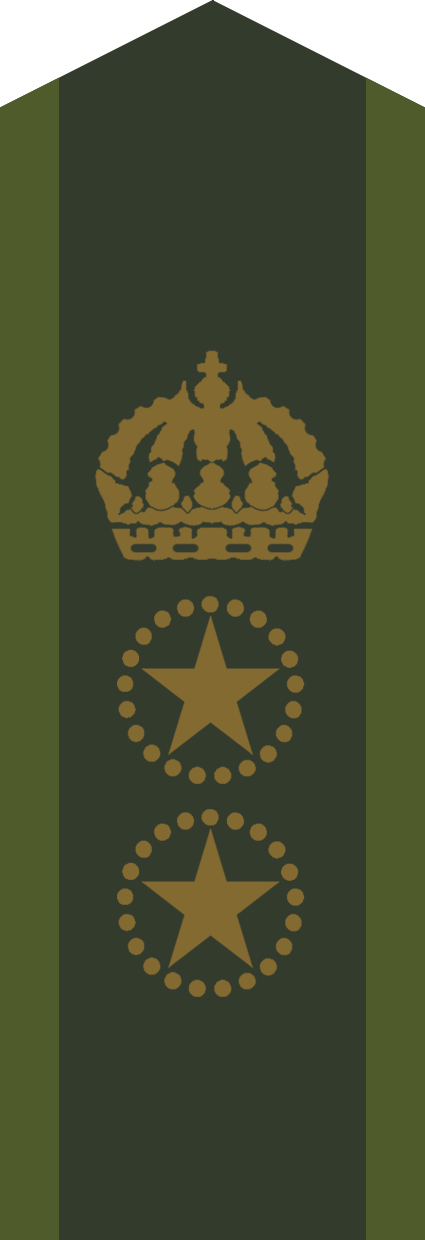
- Army
- Country: Sweden
- Next higher rank: Överste
- Next lower rank: Major

Regementsförvaltare (lit. 'regimental administrator') in the Swedish Army and the Swedish Amphibious Corps, and Flottiljförvaltare (lit. 'flotilla administrator') in the Swedish Navy and the Swedish Air Force is the senior specialist officer rank in the Swedish Armed Forces. The official translation to English of the rank of Regementsförvaltare is "Regimental Sergeant Major"; of Flottiljförvaltare in the Navy, "Chief Warrant Officer", and in the Air Force, "Wing Sergeant Major.". The use of the term administrator as a rank can be compared to the French rank of Adjutant.

Regmentsförvaltare/Flottiljförvaltare ranks above majors and Förvaltare. Regmentsförvaltare/Flottiljförvaltare has the same relative rank as a lieutenant colonel.
