= Överfanjunkare =

Swedish military rank

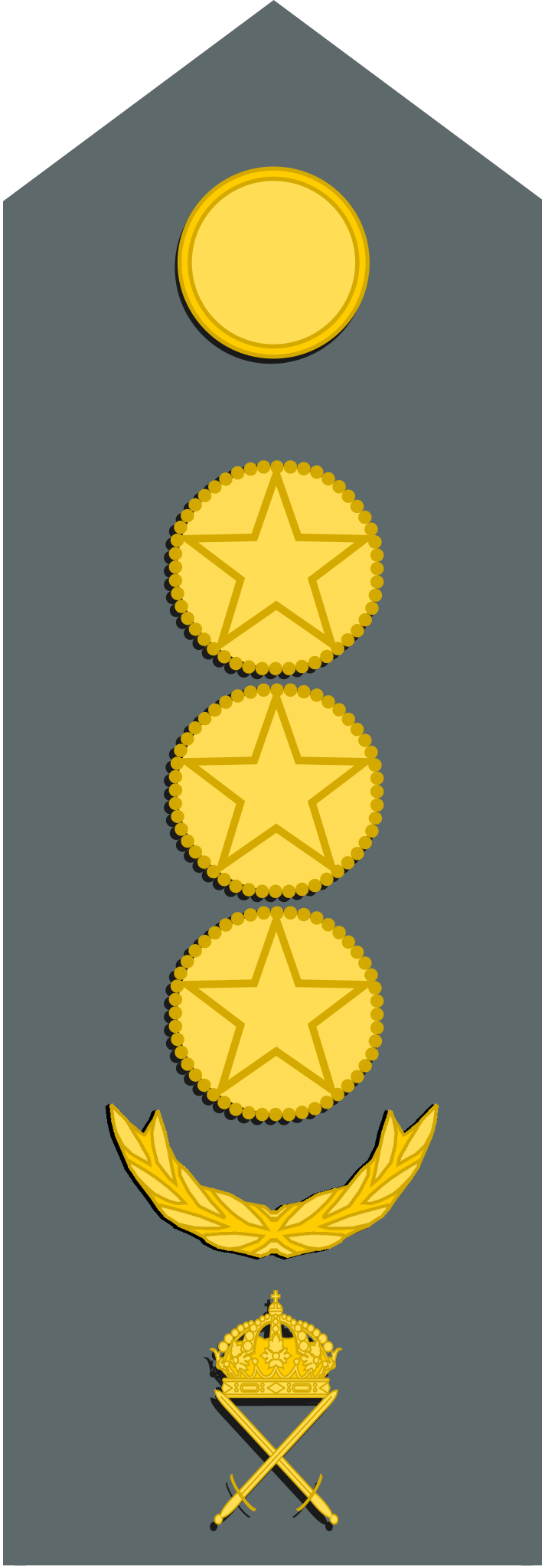
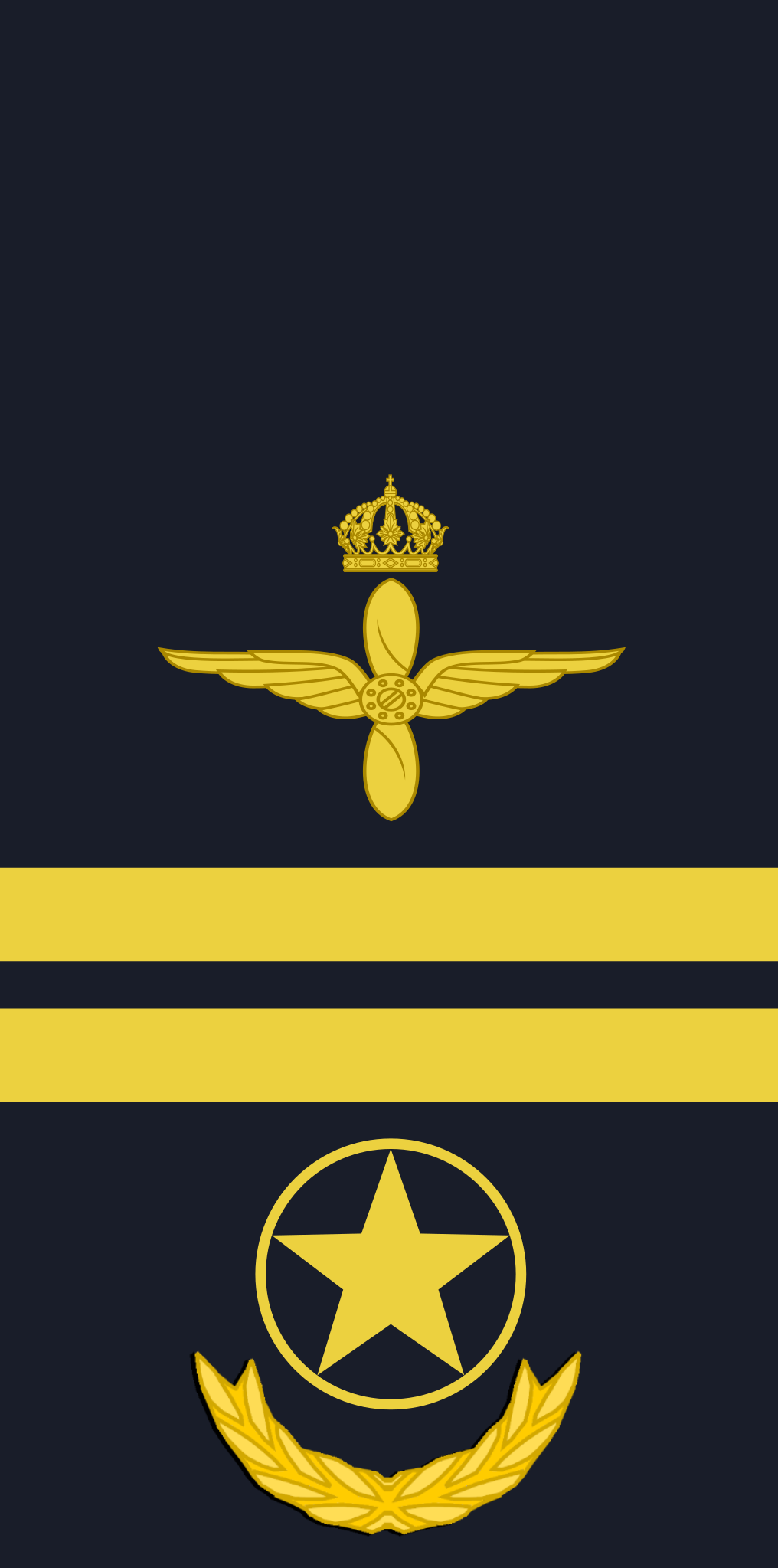
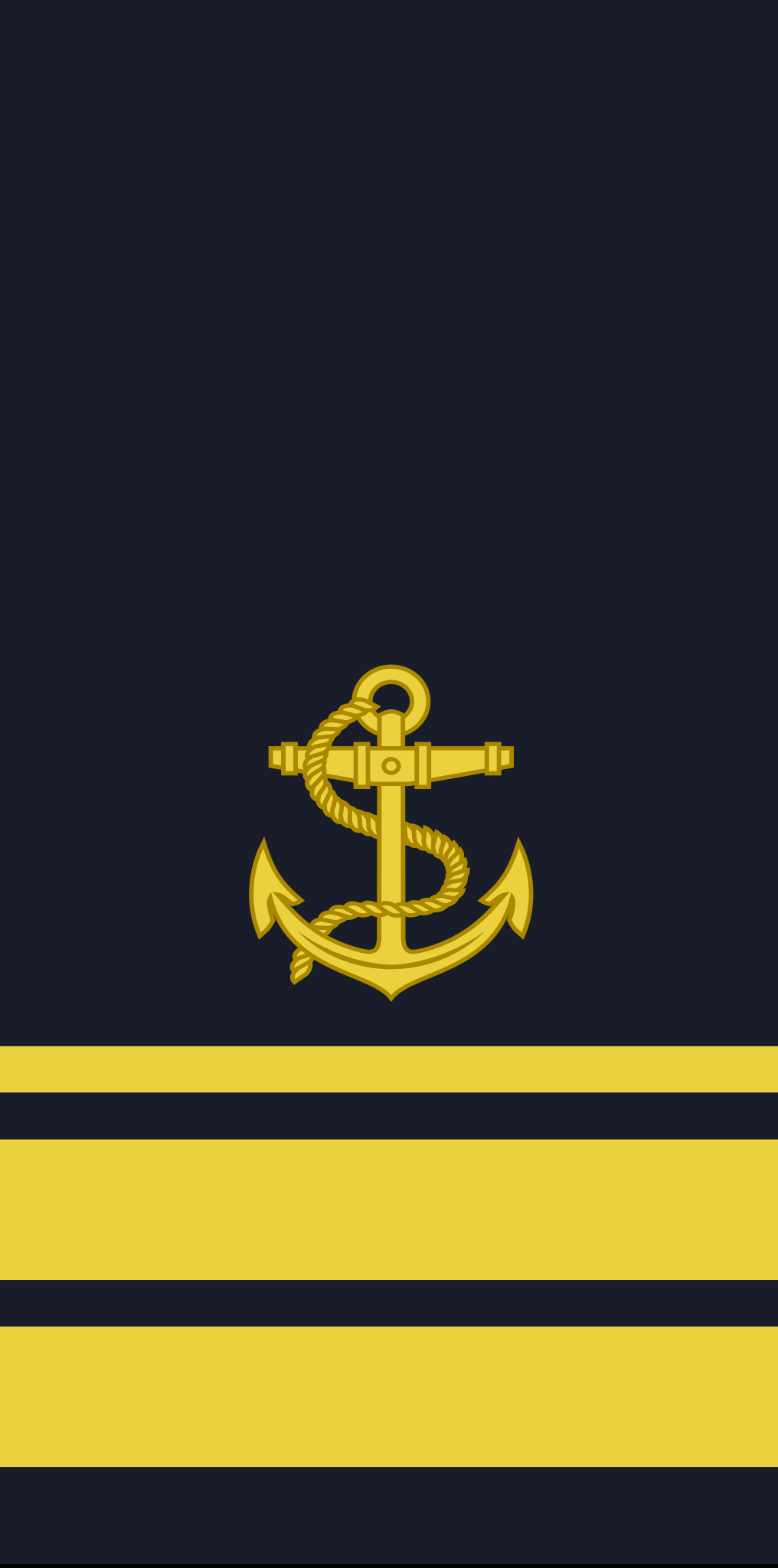
- Army Air force Navy
- Country: Sweden
- Service branch: Swedish Army; Swedish Navy; Swedish Air Force
- Rank group: Specialist officer
- NATO rank code: OR-7
- Formation: 2023
- Next higher rank: Förvaltare
- Next lower rank: Fanjunkare

Överfanjunkare (OR-7) is a Swedish military rank above Fanjunkare and below Förvaltare. The word 'Överfanjunkare' is derived from German 'Fahnenjunker', and denotes a standard-bearer, the rank loosely translates to 'Senior Colour Sergeant'. The rank was introduced to the Swedish Armed Forces in late 2023, and implemented in March 2024.
