= Förvaltare =

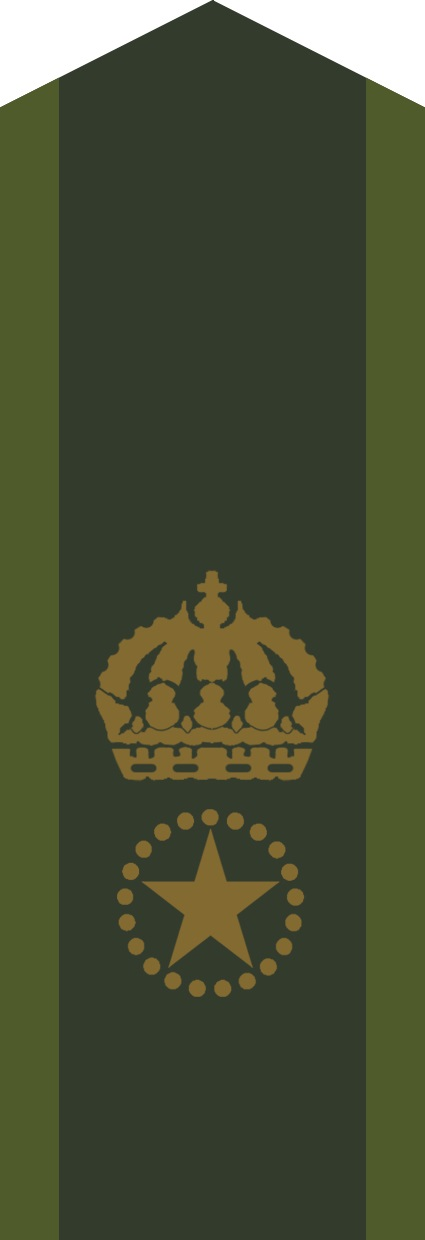
- Army Air force Navy
- Country: Sweden
- Service branch: Army; Air force; Navy
- NATO rank code: OR-8
- Next higher rank: Regementsförvaltare; Flottiljförvaltare
- Next lower rank: Överfanjunkare

Förvaltare is a Swedish military rank (OR-8) for specialist officers above Överfanjunkare and below Regementsförvaltare in the army and Flottiljförvaltare in the air force and is translated to sergeant major. The original military meaning of the word 'Förvaltare' was the same as 'conductor', as in a warrant officer conductor of ordnance stores or quartermaster stores. It can also be compared to the rank of Adjutant in Francophone forces.

== History ==
Förvaltare became a rank designation in 1945. Prior to that, it had been used as an occupational title, originally within the Swedish Army Quartermaster Corps.

== Promotion ==
For promotion to Förvaltare, 16 years time-in-service, and a minimum of four years time-in-grade as Fanjunkare is required, as well as HSOU (Sergeant Majors Academy). A Förvaltare has the same relative rank as a Major.

== Duties ==
- Förvaltare are specialist officers at Skill Levels C (Advanced) and D (Expert).
- As a functional specialist the Förvaltare serves in units and higher staffs as a staff member/functional expert in one or more areas. Examples of positions are functional staff officers, development officers, instructors at schools and centers. Late in the career, positions at the Defence Materiel Administration or at the Swedish Armed Forces Headquarters may be relevant.
- As senior advisors the Förvaltare serves as executive officers or senior advisors to the commanding officer. Positions are e.g. Battalion Sergeant Major, or second-in-command or commanding officer of a Headquarters and service company.

== Earlier rank insignia ==
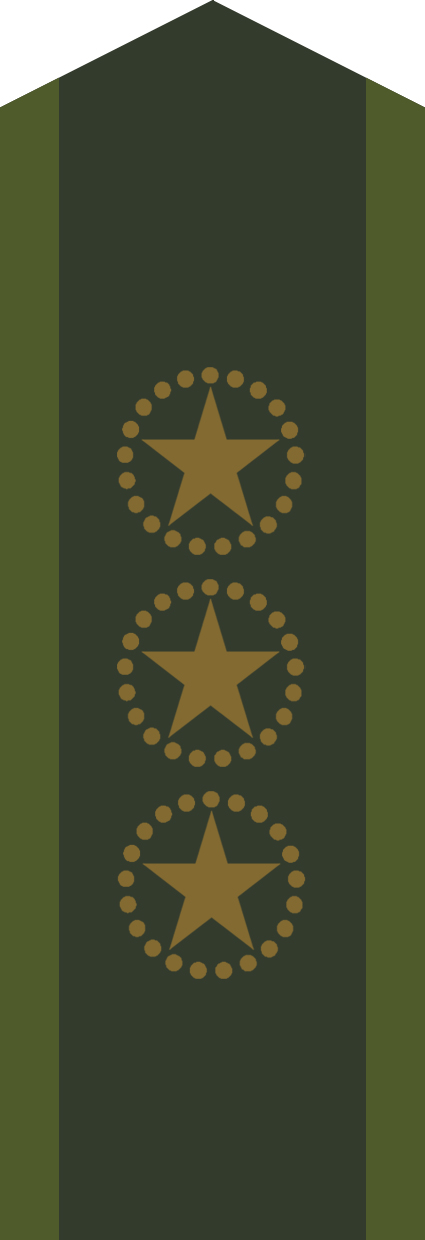
Collar patch m/58

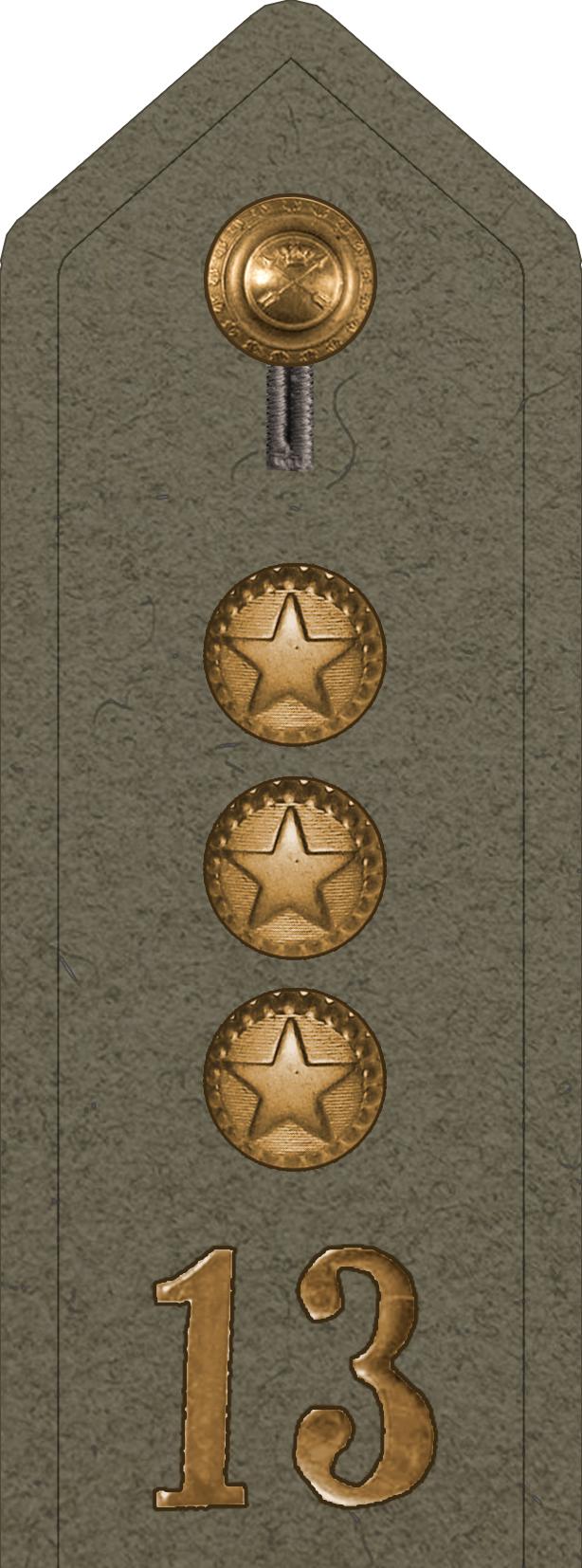
Army, rank insignia m/46

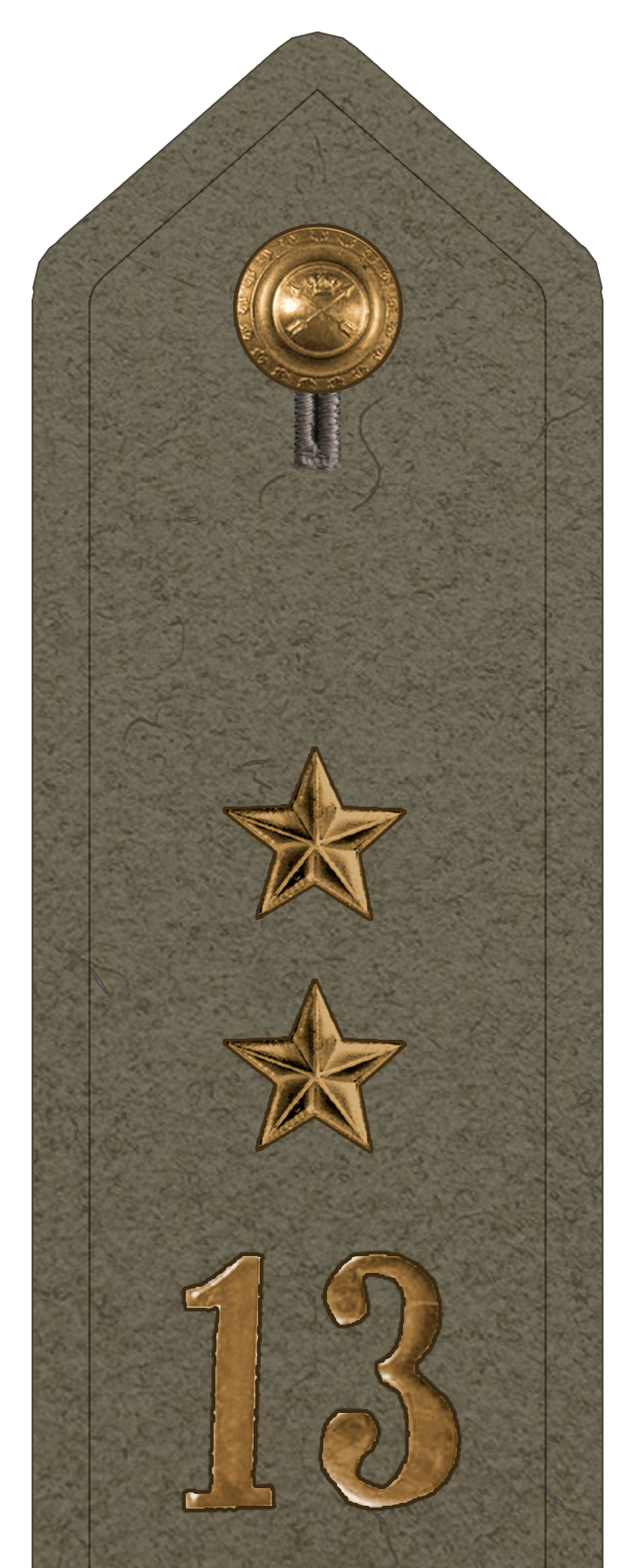
Army m/39

== See also ==
- Military ranks of the Swedish armed forces
