= Comparative air force enlisted ranks of Europe =

Rank comparison chart of air forces non-commissioned officers and other personnel of European states.

== Other ranks ==
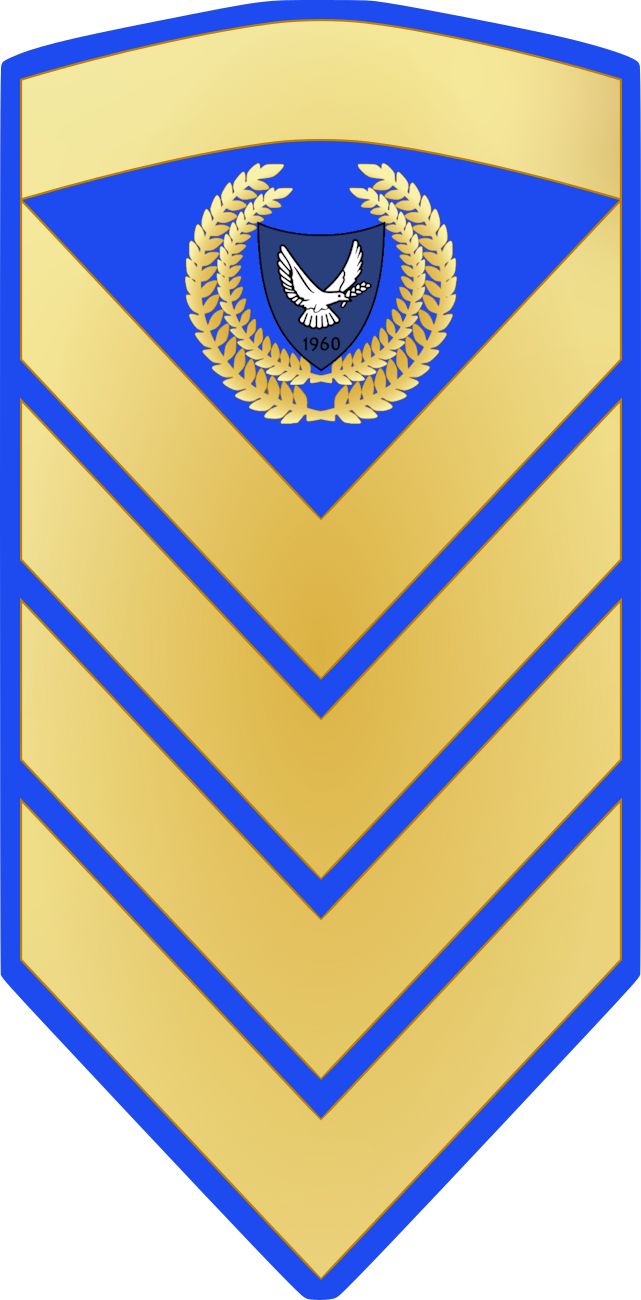
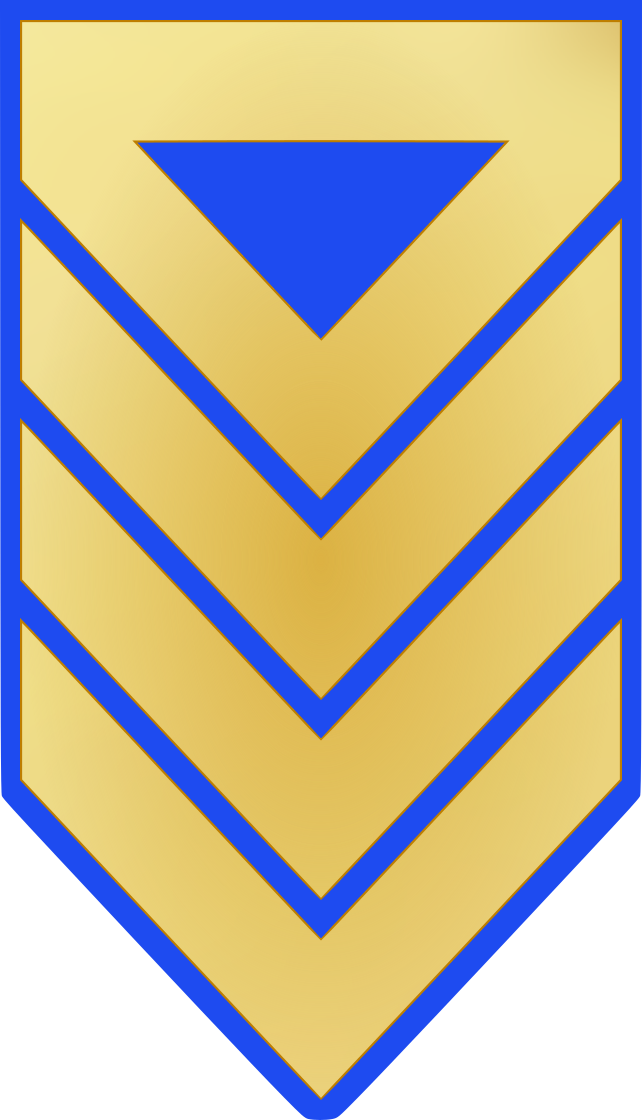
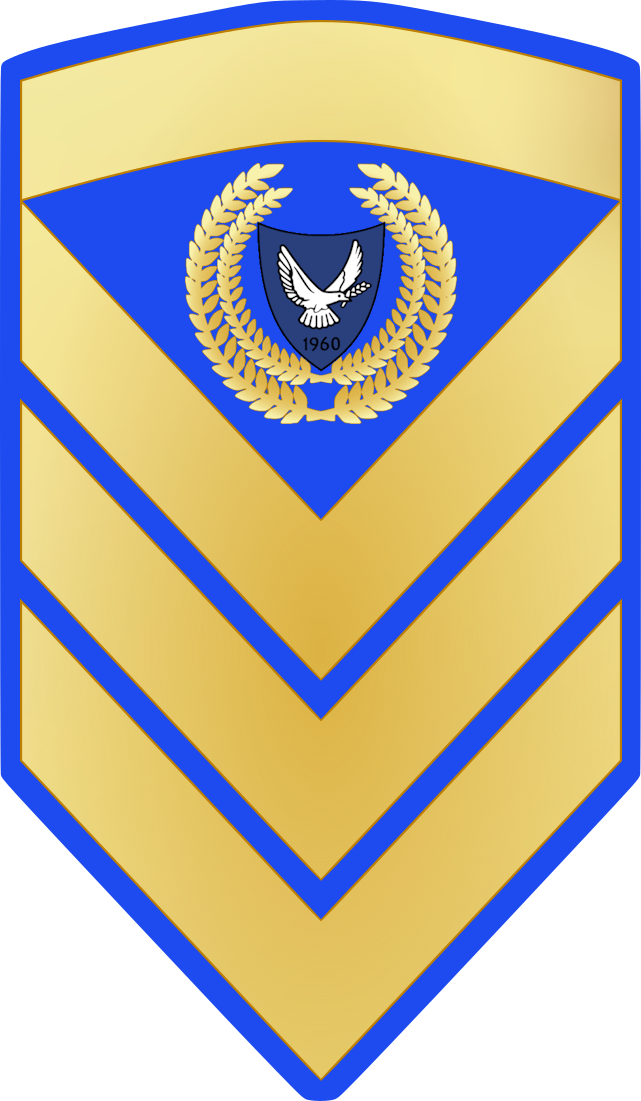
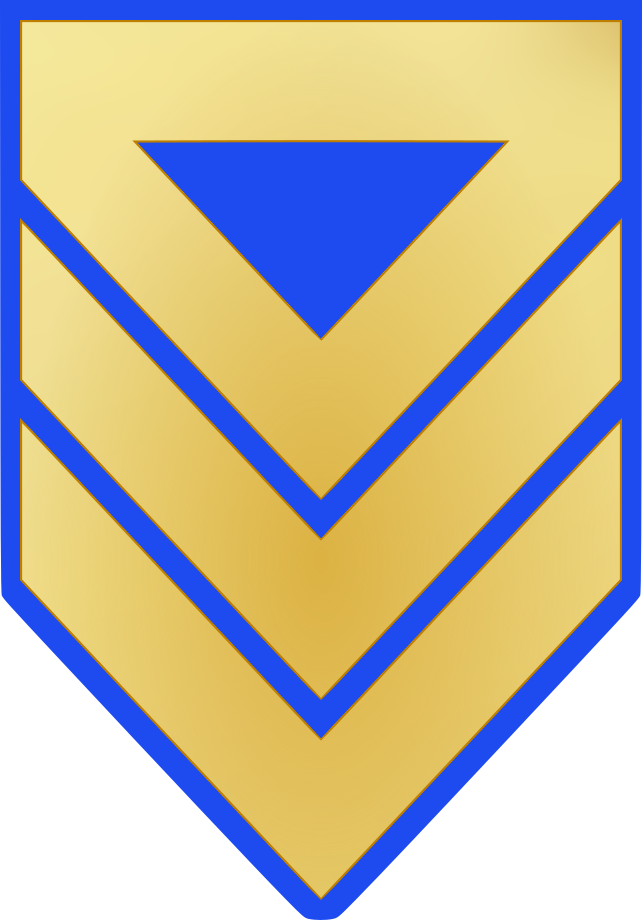
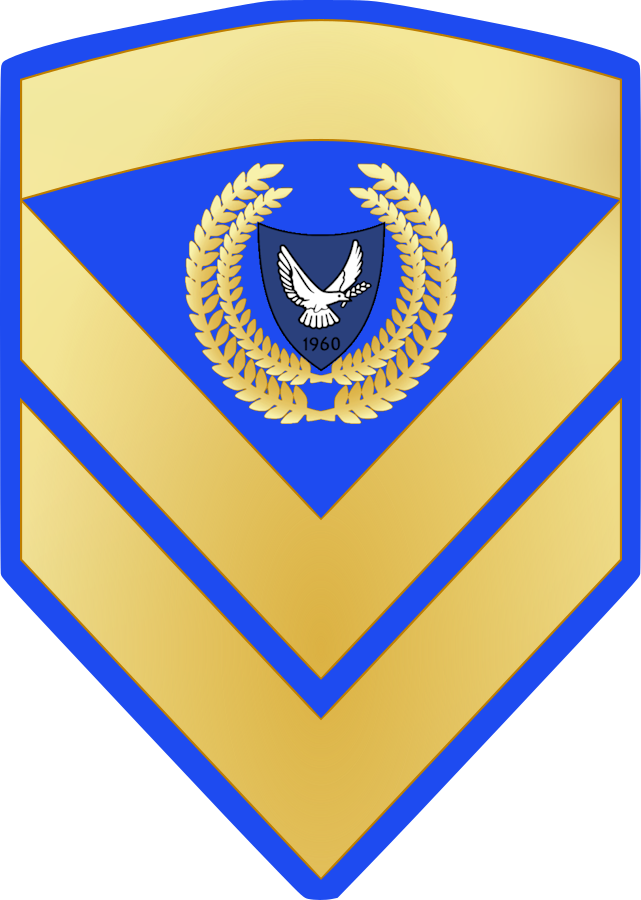
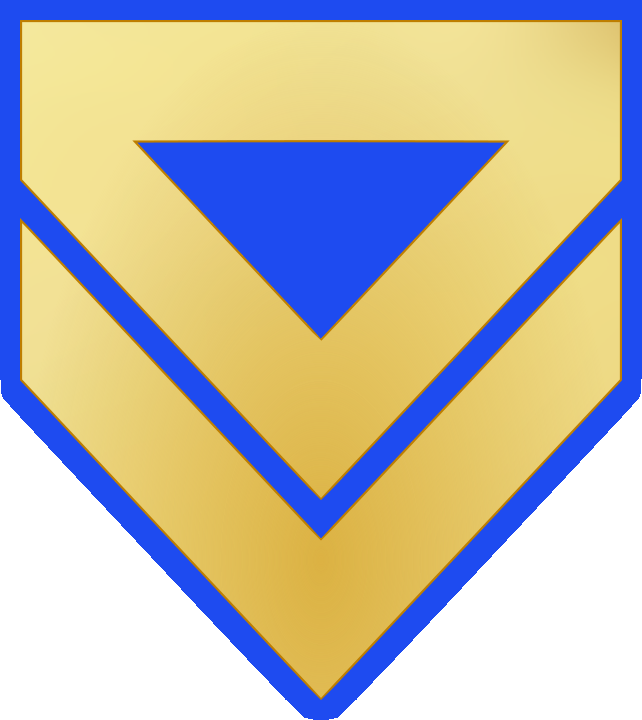
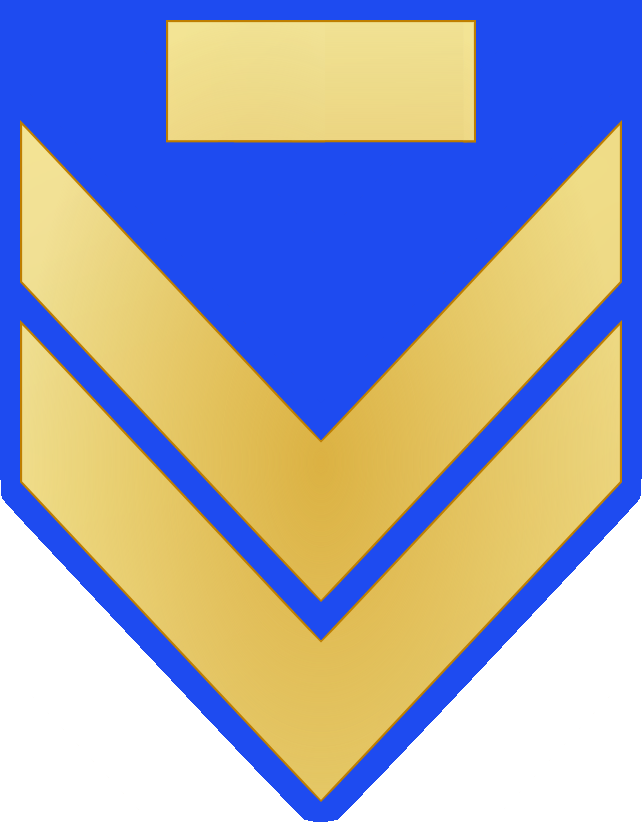
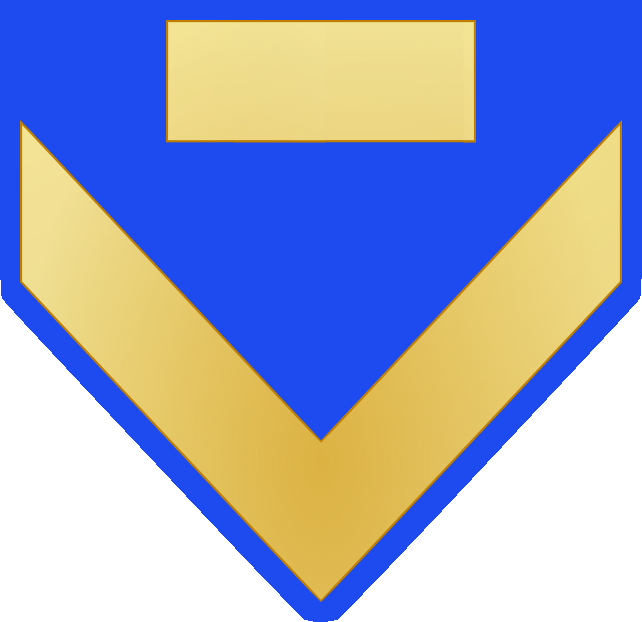
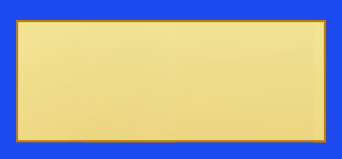
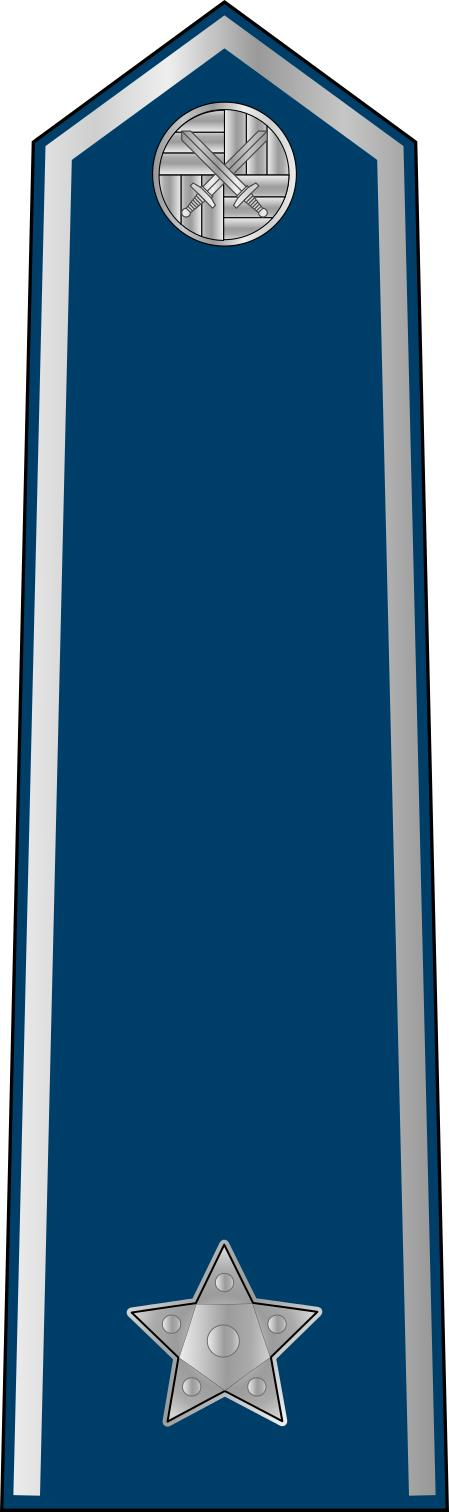
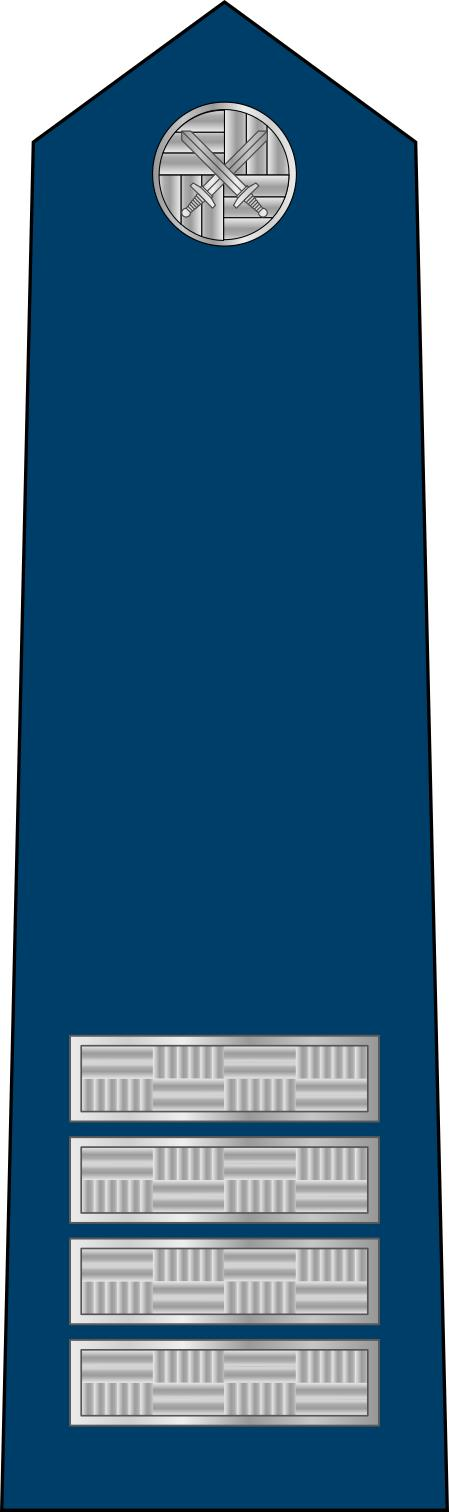
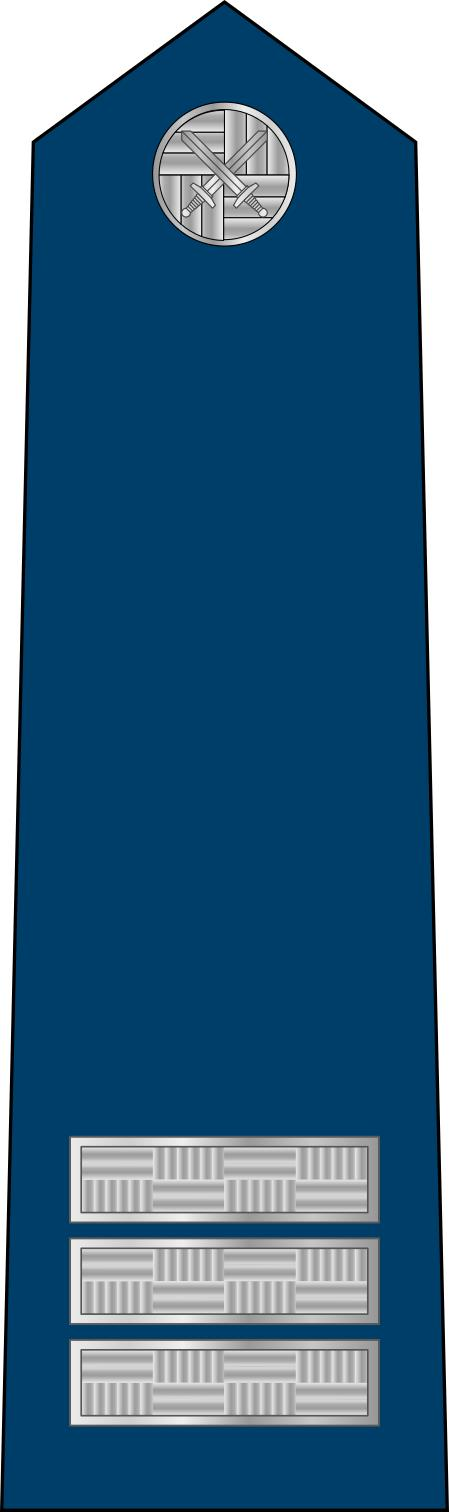
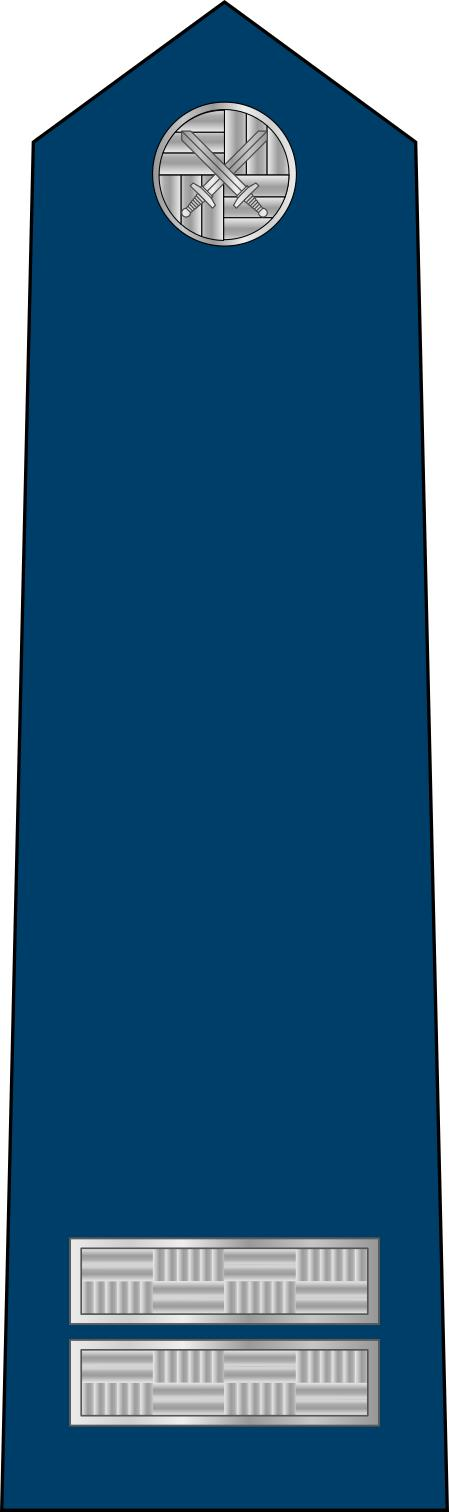
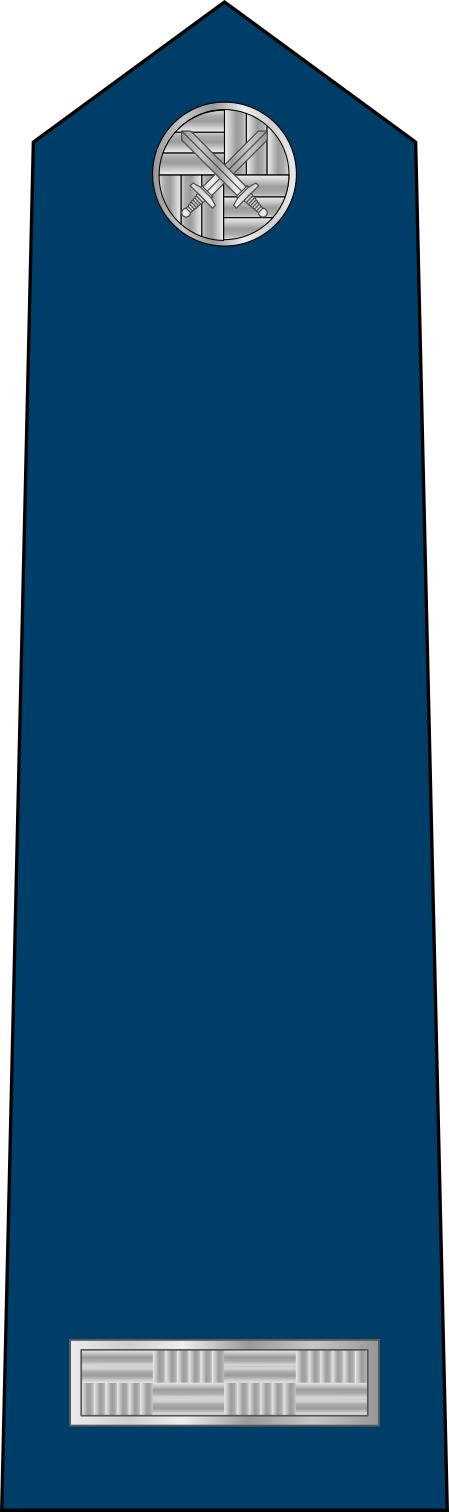
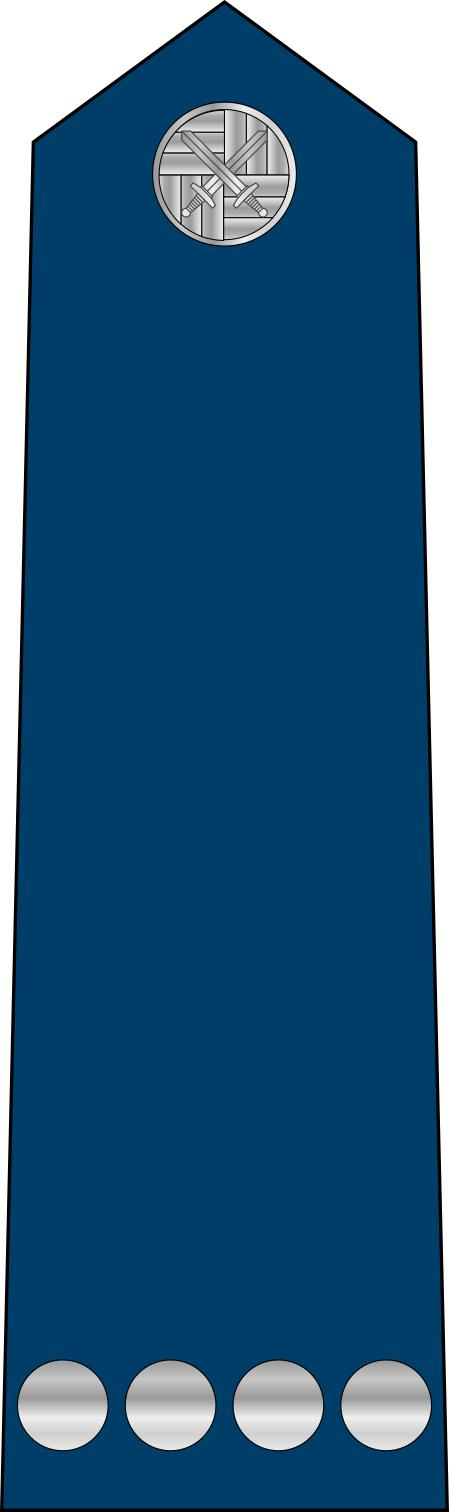
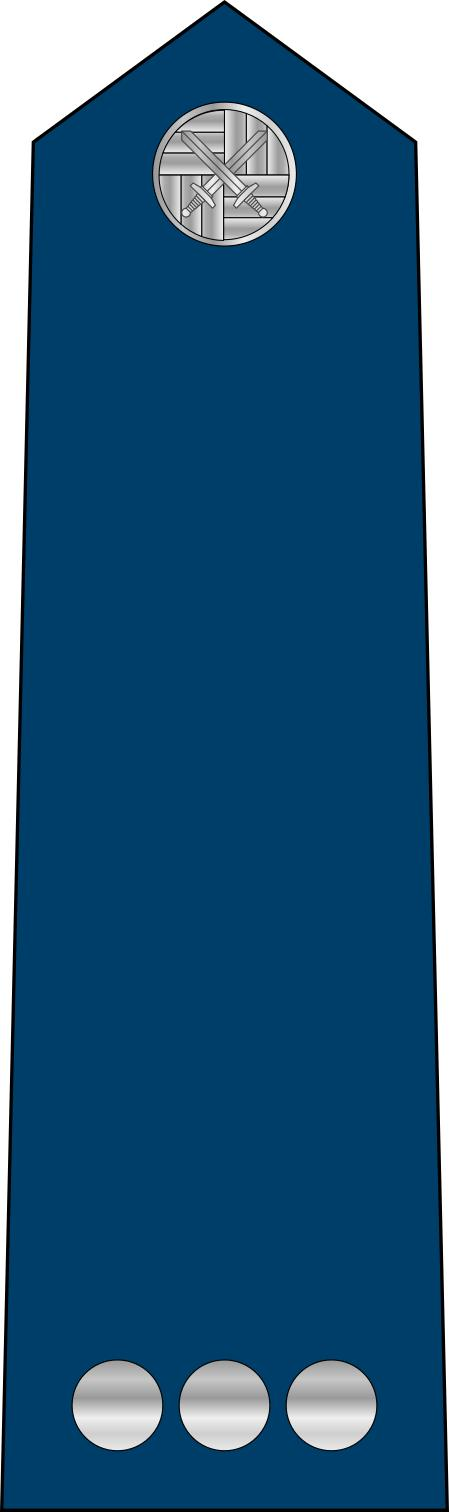
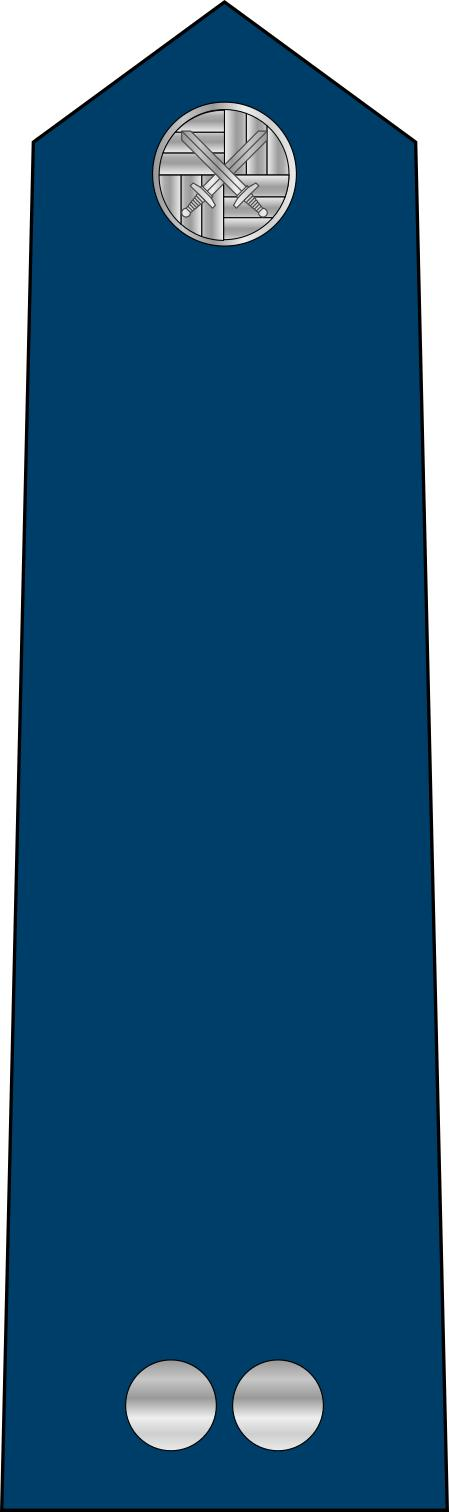
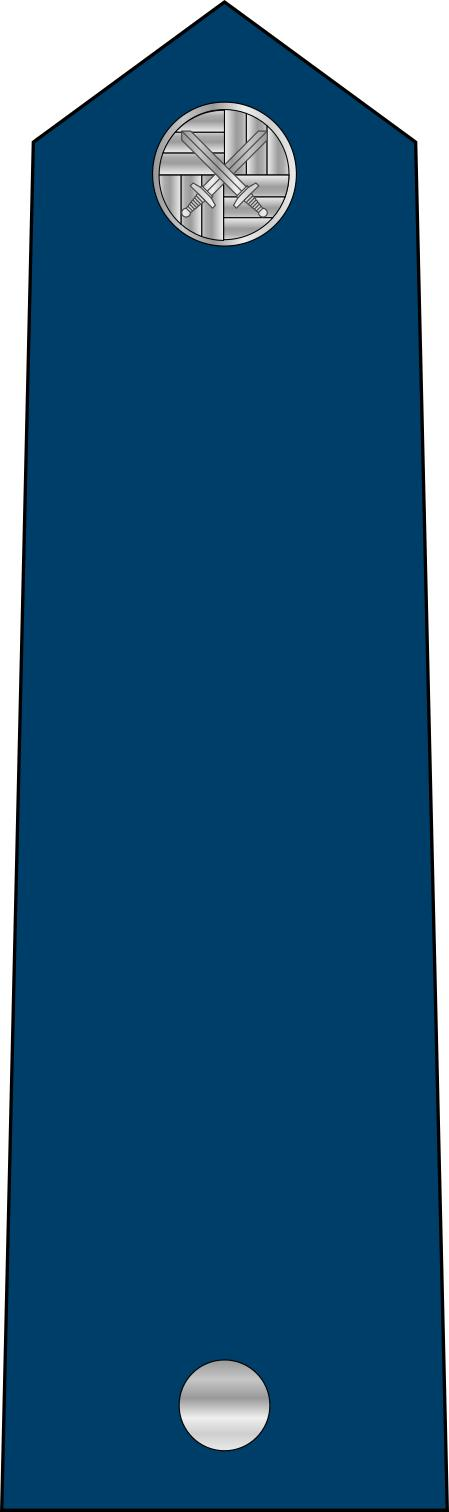
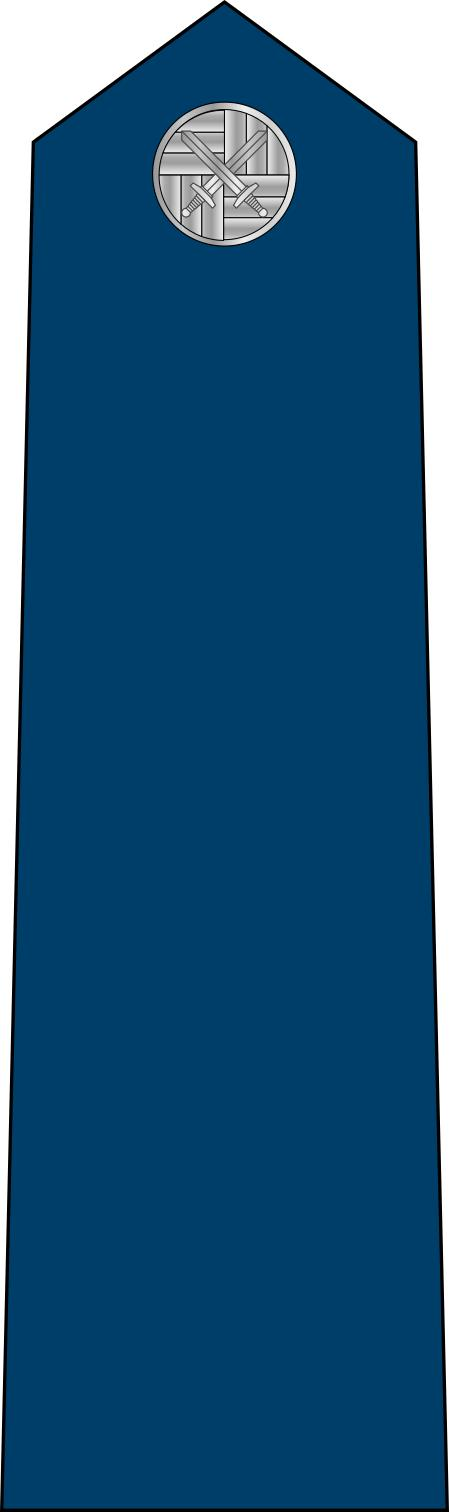
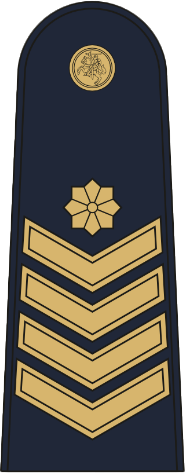
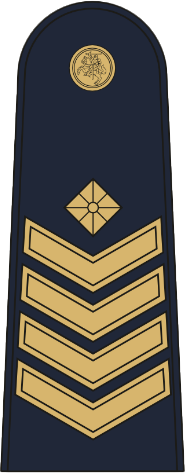
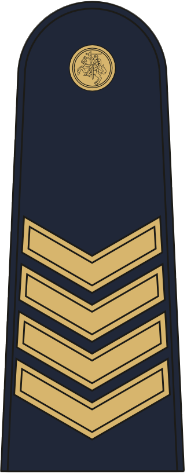
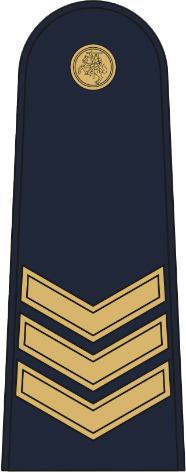
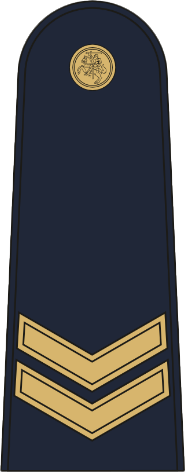
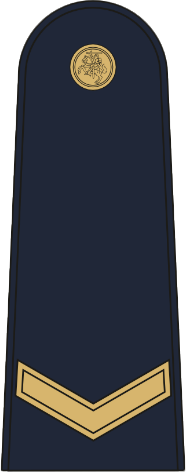
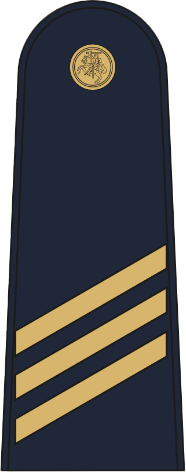
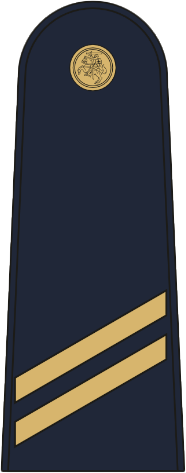
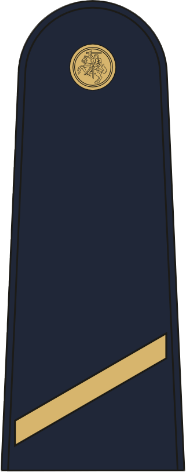
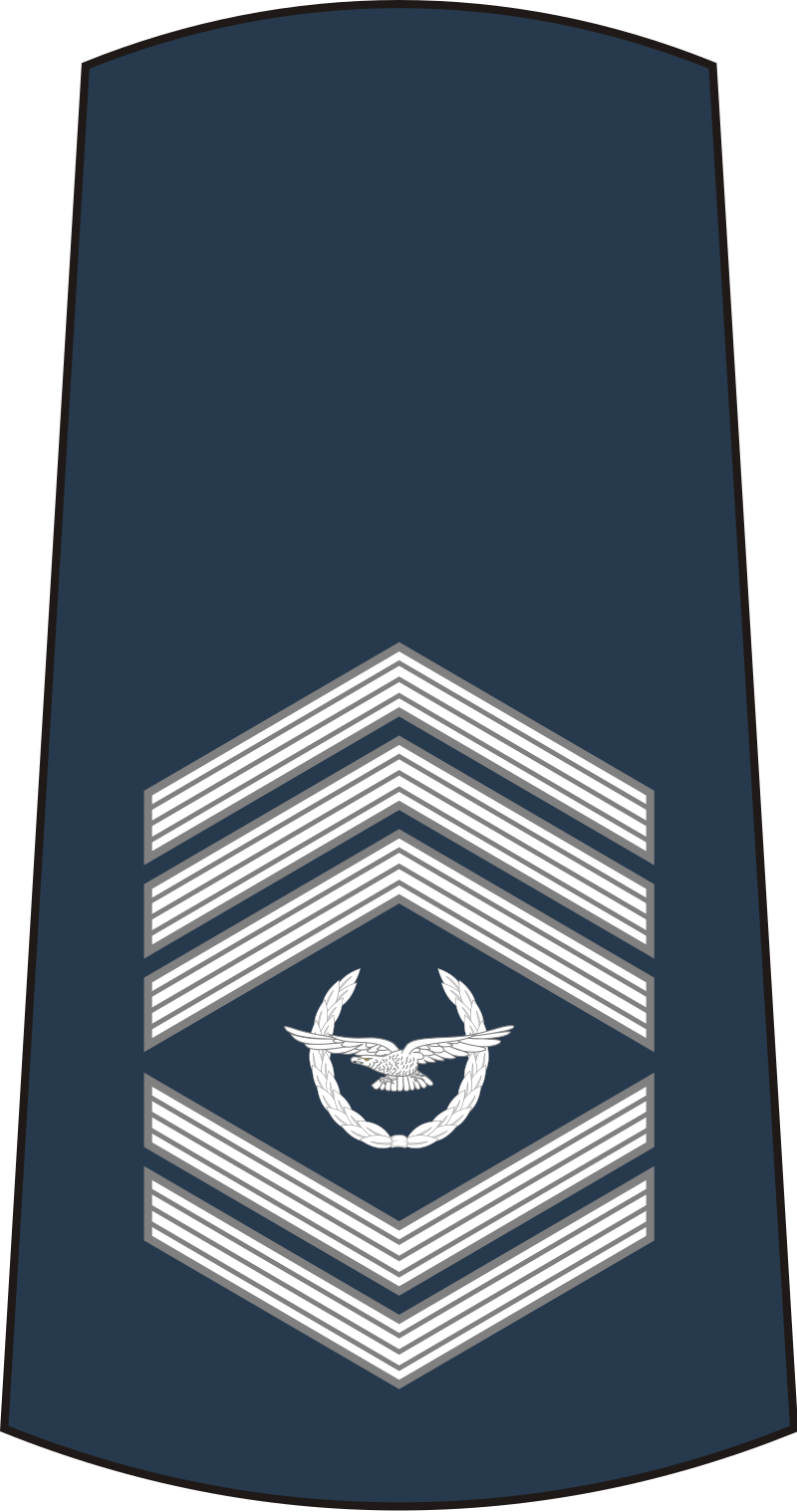
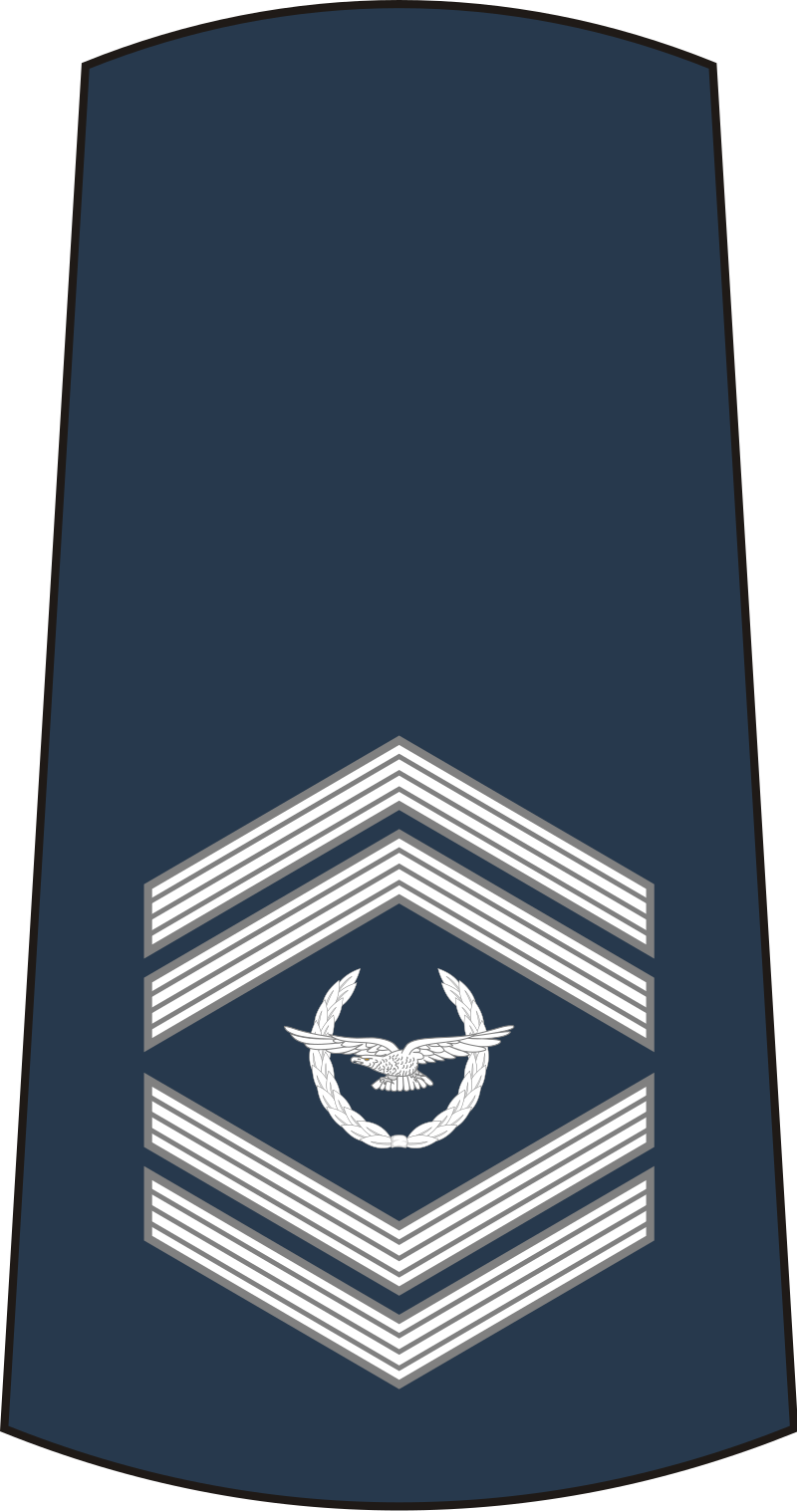
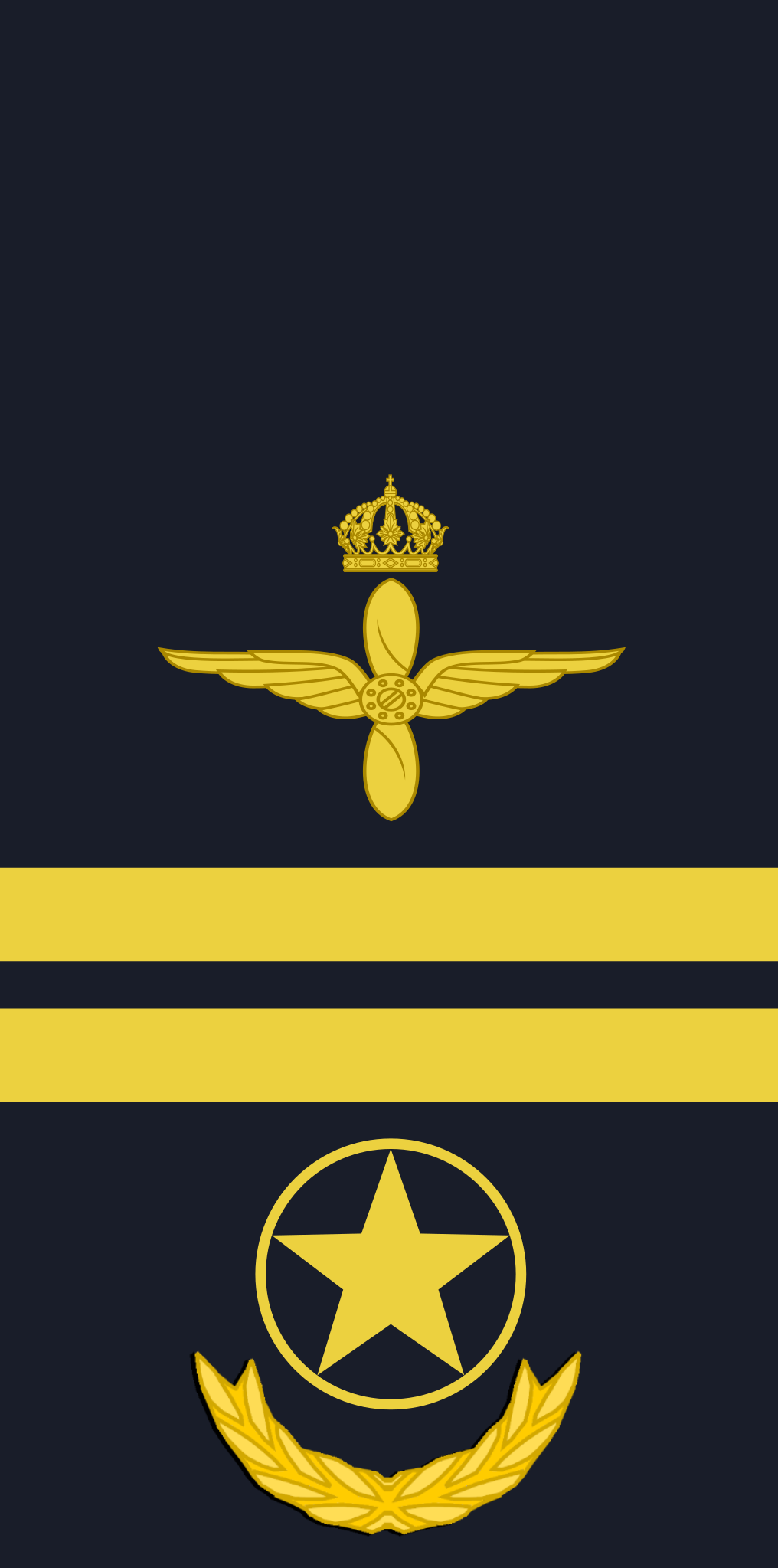
Rank group	Senior NCOs												Junior NCOs						Enlisted
Albanian Air Force
Albanian Air Force	Kryekapter			Kapter		Rreshter		Tetar		Nëntetar			Ushtar IV				Ushtar III		Ushtar II				Ushtar I
Austrian Air Force
Austrian Air Force	Vizeleutnant		Offiziersstellvertreter	Oberstabswachtmeister		Stabswachtmeister		Oberwachtmeister		Wachtmeister			Zugsführer				Korporal		Gefreiter				Rekrut
Belgian Air Component
Belgian Air Component	Adjudant-Majoor		Adjudant-chef	Adjudant		1ste sergeant-majoor		1ste sergeant-chef	1ste sergeant	Sergeant			1ste korporaal-chef		Korporaal-chef		Korporaal		1ste soldaat				Soldaat
Belgian Air Component	Adjudant-Major		Adjudant-chef	Adjudant		Premier sergent-major		Premier sergent-chef	Premier sergent	Sergent			Premier caporal-chef		Caporal-chef		Caporal		Premier soldat				Soldat
Belgian Air Component	Majoradjutant		Chefadjudant	Adjudant		1er Sergeant Major		1er Sergeant Chef	1er Sergeant	Sergeant			1er Korporal Chef		Korporal Chef		Korporal		1er soldat				Soldat
Bulgarian Air Force
Bulgarian Air Force	Офицерски кандидат Ofitserski kandidat			Старшина; Starshyna		Старши сержант Starshi serzhant		Сержант; Serzhant		Младши сержант Mladshi serzhant			Ефрейтор; Efreytor				Редник; Rednik
Croatian Air Force																							No insignia
Croatian Air Force	Časnički namjesnik			Stožerni narednik		Nadnarednik		Narednik		Desetnik			Skupnik				Razvodnik		Pozornik				Vojnik
Cyprus Air Forces																							Arm/corps insignia only
Cyprus Air Forces	Ανθυπασπιστής; Anthypaspistís			Αρχισμηνίας; Archisminías		Επισμηνίας; Episminías		Σμηνίας; Sminías					Υποσμηνίας; Yposminías				Ανθυποσμηνίας; Anthyposminías						Σμηνίτης; Sminítis
Czech Air Force
Czech Air Force	Štábní praporčík			Nadpraporčík		Praporčík		Nadrotmistr		Rotmistr			Rotný				Četař		Desátník				Svobodník	Vojín
Rank group	Senior NCOs												Junior NCOs						Enlisted
Royal Danish Air Force
Royal Danish Air Force	Chefsergent			Seniorsergent		Oversergent				Sergent		Sergent (Officerselev)	Korporal				Flyverspecialist		Flyveroverkonstabel				Flyverkonstabel
Estonian Air Force
Estonian Air Force	Ülemveebel		Staabiveebel	Vanemveebel		Veebel		Nooremveebel		Vanemseersant			Seersant		Nooremseersant				Kapral				Reamees
(France) French Air and Space Force
(France) French Air and Space Force	Major		Adjudant-chef	Adjudant				Sergent-chef		Sergent			Caporal-chef				Caporal		Aviateur 1^{e} classe				Aviateur 2^{e} classe
Finnish Air Force
Finnish Air Force	Sotilasmestari			Ylivääpeli		Vääpeli		Ylikersantti		Kersantti			Alikersantti				Korpraali		Lentosotamies
Finnish Air Force	Militärmästare			Överfältväbel		Fältväbel		Översergeant		Sergeant			Undersergeant				Korpral		Soldat
Georgian Air Force
Georgian Air Force	მთავარი სერჟანტი Mtavari serzhant’i			მასტერ-სერჟანტი Mast’er-serzhant’i		უფროსი სერჟანტი Uprosi serzhant’i				სერჟანტი Serzhant’i			უმცროსი სერჟანტი Umtsrosi serzhant’i		კაპრალ-სპეციალისტი K’ap’ral-sp’etsialist’i		კაპრალი K’ap’rali		I კლასის რიგითი I k’lasis rigiti				რიგითი Rigiti
German Air Force
German Air Force	Oberstabsfeldwebel			Stabsfeldwebel		Hauptfeldwebel		Oberfeldwebel	Feldwebel	Stabsunteroffizier		Unteroffizier	Stabskorporal	Korporal	Oberstabsgefreiter	Stabsgefreiter	Hauptgefreiter	Obergefreiter	Gefreiter				Flieger
German Air Force (Officer designate)
German Air Force (Officer designate)						Oberfähnrich		Fähnrich		Fahnenjunker
Hellenic Air Force
Hellenic Air Force	Ανθυπασπιστής (Note: Greece has only one level of Warrant Officer. According to the current issue (2021) of STANAG 2116, the Greek Warrant Officers are included in OR-9, however they are afforded the privileges of an officer. See STANAG 2116 note 29, page D-9); Anthypaspistis			Αρχισμηνίας; Archisminias		Επισμηνίας; Episminias		Σμηνίας; Sminias					Υποσμηνίας; Yposminias										Σμηνίτης; Sminitis
Rank group	Senior NCOs												Junior NCOs						Enlisted
Hungarian Air Force
Hungarian Air Force	Főtörzszászlós			Törzszászlós	Zászlós	Főtörzsőrmester		Törzsőrmester		Őrmester			Szakaszvezető				Tizedes		Őrvezető				Közkatona
Iceland	No air force
Irish Air Corps																								No insignia
Irish Air Corps	Regimental sergeant major Maor-sáirsint reisiminte			Regimental quartermaster sergeant Ceathrúsháirsint reisiminte		Flight sergeant Sáirsint eitleoige		Flight quartermaster sergeant Ceathrúsháirsint eitleoige		Sergeant; Sáirsint			Corporal; Ceannaire				Airman 3 star Eitleoir, 3 réalta		Airman 2 Star; Eitleoir, 2 réalta				Apprentice; Printíseach	Recruit; Earcach
Italian Air Force				Maresciallo di prima classe / Maresciallo di seconda classe / Maresciallo di terza classe									Graduato aiutante / Primo graduato / Primo aviere capo / Primo aviere scelto / Aviere capo										No insignia
Italian Air Force	Primo luogotenente	Luogotenente	Primo maresciallo	Maresciallo di prima classe / Maresciallo di seconda classe / Maresciallo di terza classe		Sergente maggiore aiutante	Sergente maggiore capo	Sergente maggiore		Sergente			Graduato aiutante / Primo graduato / Primo aviere capo / Primo aviere scelto / Aviere capo				Primo aviere		Aviere scelto				Aviere
Kosovo	No air force
Latvian Air Force
Latvian Air Force	Augstākais virsseržants			Galvenais virsseržants		Štāba virsseržants		Virsseržants		Seržants			Kaprālis				Dižkareivis		Kareivis
Liechtenstein	No air force
Lithuanian Air Force
Lithuanian Air Force	Seržantas majoras			Viršila		Štabo seržantas		Vyresnysis seržantas		Seržantas			Grandinis				Vyresnysis eilinis		Eilinis				Jaunesnysis eilinis
Luxembourg	No air force
North Macedonia Air Force																							No insignia
North Macedonia Air Force	Главен наредник Glaven narednik			Наредник; Narednik		Постар водник I класа Postar vodnik I klasa		Постар водник Postar vodnik		Водник 1 класа Vodnik 1 klasa			Водник; Vodnik				Помлад водник Pomlad vodnik	Десетар; Desetar	Разводник; Razvodnik				Војник; Vojnik
Monaco	No air force
Montenegrin Air Force
Montenegrin Air Force	Zastavnik 1 klase			Zastavnik		Stariji vodnik 1 klase		Stariji vodnik		Vodnik 1 klase			Vodnik				Mlađi vodnik		Desetar				Razvodnik
Royal Netherlands Air Force
Royal Netherlands Air Force	Adjudant-onderofficier					Sergeant-majoor		Sergeant der 1e klasse		Sergeant			Korporaal der 1e klasse				Korporaal		Soldaat der 1ste klasse		Soldaat der 2de klasse		Soldaat der 3de klasse
Rank group	Senior NCOs												Junior NCOs						Enlisted
Royal Norwegian Air Force
Royal Norwegian Air Force	Sersjantmajor			Kommandérsersjant		Stabssersjant		Oversersjant		Vingsersjant		Sersjant	Ledende spesialist				Spesialist		Visespesialist				Ledende flysoldat	Flysoldat
Polish Air Force
Polish Air Force	Starszy chorąży sztabowy		Starszy chorąży	Chorąży				Młodszy chorąży		Starszy sierżant			Sierżant				Plutonowy	Starszy kapral	Kapral				Starszy szeregowy	Szeregowy
Portuguese Air Force
Portuguese Air Force	Sargento-mor		Sargento-chefe	Sargento-ajudante		Primeiro-sargento		Segundo-sargento		Furriel		Segundo-furriel	Cabo-de-secção				Cabo-adjunto		Primeiro-cabo		Segundo-cabo		Soldado
Romanian Air Force
Romanian Air Force	Plutonier adjutant principal		Plutonier adjutant	Plutonier-major		Plutonier		Sergent-major		Sergent			Caporal clasa I	Caporal clasa a II-a	Caporal clasa a III-a		Fruntaș		Soldat
Russian Aerospace Forces
Russian Aerospace Forces	Ста́рший пра́порщик Stárshiy práporshchik		Пра́порщик; Práporshchyk	Старшина́ Starshyná		Ста́рший сержа́нт Stárshiy serzhánt		Сержа́нт; Serzhánt		Мла́дший сержа́нт Mládshiy serzhánt			Ефре́йтор; Efréĭtor				Рядово́й; Ryadovóy
San Marino	No air force
Serbian Air Force and Air Defence
Serbian Air Force and Air Defence	Заставник I класе Zastavnik I klase			Заставник; Zastavnik		Старији Водник I класе Stariji Vodnik I klase		Старији Водник; Stariji Vodnik		Водник; Vodnik			Млађи водник Mlađi vodnik				Десетар; Desetar		Разводник; Razvodnik				Војник; Vojnik
(Slovakia) Slovak Air Force
(Slovakia) Slovak Air Force	Štábny nadrotmajster			Nadrotmajster		Rotmajster		Rotný		Čatár			Desiatnik				Slobodník		Vojak 2. stupňa				Vojak 1. stupňa
Rank group	Senior NCOs												Junior NCOs						Enlisted
(Slovenia) Slovenian Air Force and Air Defence
(Slovenia) Slovenian Air Force and Air Defence	Višji štabni praporščak	Štabni praporščak	Višji praporščak	Praporščak	Višji štabni vodnik	Štabni vodnik		Višji vodnik		Vodnik			Naddesetnik				Desetnik		Poddesetnik				Vojak
Spanish Air and Space Force
Spanish Air and Space Force	Suboficial mayor		Subteniente	Brigada		Sargento primero		Sargento		Cabo mayor			Cabo primero				Cabo		Soldado de primera				Soldado
Swedish Air Force
Swedish Air Force	Flottiljförvaltare			Förvaltare		Överfanjunkare	Fanjunkare	Översergeant	Sergeant	Överfurir		Furir	Korpral				Vicekorpral		Menig 4	Menig 3	Menig 2	Menig 1	Menig
Swiss Air Force																								No insignia
Swiss Air Force	Chefadjutant		Hauptadjutant	Stabsadjutant	Adjutant Unteroffizier	Hauptfeldweibel	Fourier	Feldweibel		Oberwachtmeister		Wachtmeister	Korporal				Obergefreiter		Gefreiter				Soldat	Rekrut
Swiss Air Force	Adjudant-chef		Adjudant-major	Adjudant d'état-major	Adjudant sous-officier	Sergent-major chef	Fourrier	Sergent-major		Sergent chef		Sergent	Caporal				Appointé-chef		Appointé				Soldat	Recrue
Turkish Air Force																							No insignia
Turkish Air Force	Astsubay kıdemli başçavuş			Astsubay başçavuş		Astsubay kıdemli üstçavuş		Astsubay üstçavuş		Astsubay kıdemli çavuş	Astsubay çavuş	Astsubay astçavuş	Uzman çavuş		Çavuş		Uzman onbaşı	Onbaşı					Er
Ukrainian Air Force
Ukrainian Air Force	Головний майстер-сержант Holovnyi maister-serzhant		Старший майстер-сержант Starshyi maister-serzhant	Майстер-сержант; Maister-serzhant		Штаб-сержант; Shtab-serzhant		Головний сержант Holovnyi serzhant		Старший сержант Starshyi serzhant			Сержант; Serzhant				Молодший сержант Molodshyi serzhant		Старший солдат Starshyi soldat				Солдат; Soldat
Royal Air Force																							No insignia
Royal Air Force	Warrant officer					Flight sergeant	Chief technician	Sergeant					Corporal				Lance corporal (RAF Regiment only)		Air specialist (class 1) technician	Air specialist (class 1)	Air specialist (class 2)		Air recruit
Royal Air Force (Aircrew)
Royal Air Force (Aircrew)	Master aircrew					Flight sergeant aircrew		Sergeant aircrew
Vatican City	No air force
Rank group	Senior NCOs												Junior NCOs						Enlisted

== See also ==
- Comparative air force officer ranks of Europe
