= Förste sergeant =

Swedish military rank

- Army Air force Navy
- Country: Sweden
- Service branch: Army; Air force; Navy
- Next higher rank: Fanjunkare
- Next lower rank: Sergeant

Förste Sergeant (First Sergeant) is a Swedish military rank above Sergeant and below Fanjunkare. First Sergeant is an entry or transitional level professional rank awarded after a minimum of 6 months of basic training followed by 18 months (3 semesters) of professional training. A typical role of a First Sergeant is to act as a section commander of 6–12 men or platoon 2 I/C. Corresponding ranks in the Navy are Förste styrman, Förste maskinist, and Förste konstapel.

== Obtaining the rank in Sweden ==
Short route: Three months of Basic Military Training (GMU), three months of Extended Military Training (KMU) followed by 18 months of professional specialist training.

Long route: minimum of 4 years of service (usually longer) in the junior ranks of which 2 years must be in the billet of OR-4/5, followed by 40–60 weeks of specialist training/validation.

== History and related ranks ==
=== Sweden: 2008 ===
The rank was introduced as a professional rank.

=== Sweden: 6 June 2008 ===
First cadre of 92 Army Specialist Officers graduated as Sergeants from the Land Warfare Center at Kvarn. Those have received training to become squadleaders and will serve as instructors at training centers around Sweden. Those sergeants were promoted to this rank in January 2009.

== See also ==
- Military ranks of the Swedish Armed Forces
- Swedish Armed Forces
- Officer Training
- Classification of military personnel in international operations
