= Peter Leijonhufvud =

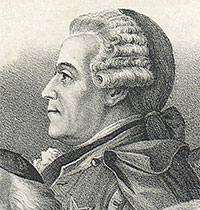
Peter in military uniform.

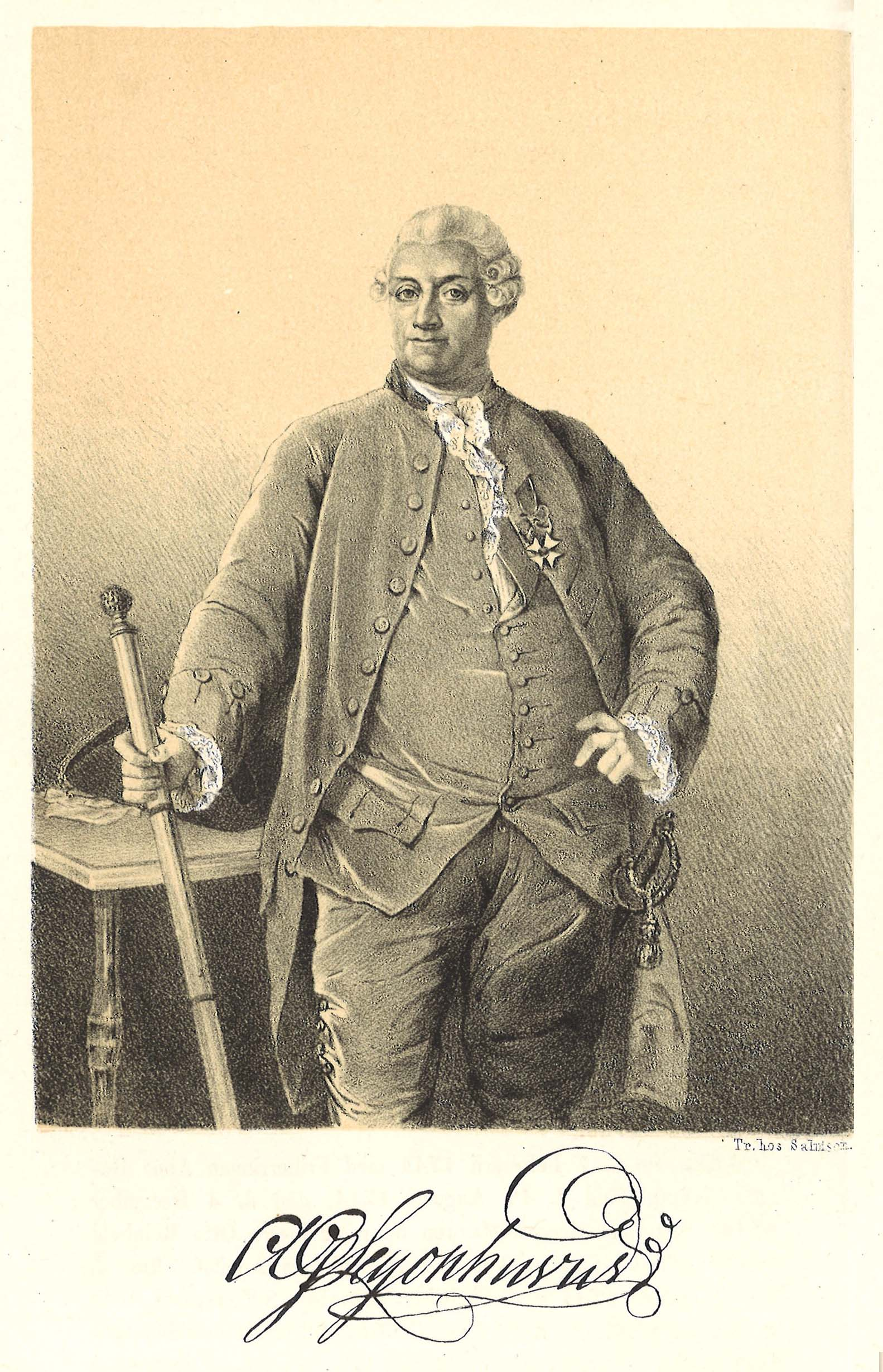
Peter in the uniform of a Lord Marshal with the knight's cross of the Order of the Sword on hid left breast.

Axel Peter Gabriel Leijonhufvud (13 September 1717 – 19 June 1789) was a Swedish military officer. Leijonhufvud was one of Crown prince Gustav's (III) cavaliers, a civil servant and a lord marshal of Sweden.

== Biography ==
Leijonhufvud became a student in Uppsala in 1730, extra ordinary chancellor in the chancellery in 1734 and a volunteer at the Life Guards in 1737. He was promoted to master of armory in 1737, furir in 1738, sergeant in 1739, ensign in 1741, and as such participated in the Russian War of (1741–1743). In 1744, Leijonhufvud became a captain-lieutenant in the Turku County Infantry Regiment, where he became a captain in 1746. By change, he instead became a captain at the Västerbottens regemente in 1752. Leijonhufvud was a cavalier to Crown prince Gustav 1756–1762, was promoted in 1757 to major and in 1763 to lieutenant colonel before his resignation in 1766. In 1757 he was made a Knight of the Order of the Sword.

Leijonhuvud became court marshal in 1766 and was chief chamberlain to Princess Sofia Albertina from 1767 to 1770. He was a lord marshal at the 1771/72 Parliament and in 1772 became a knight's house director. In the same year he became commander of the Order of the Polar Star and in 1775 president of the Turku Court of Appeal.

Leijonhufvud became a member (number 1) and founder of the Royal Swedish Academy of Music in 1771 and was its first president. He became a member in 1753 (number 11) and an honorary member in 1786 of the Royal Swedish Academy of History and Antiquities.

Leijonhufvud has authored Tanke-val i dag evangelier, uti vers, published in 1790, the year after his death.

== See also ==
- Gabriel Leijonhufvud the Elder, (1755–1826), son of Peter Leijonhufvud, was a swedish officer and freemason.
- Gabriel Leijonhufvud the Younger, (1812–1897), grandson of Peter Leijonhufvud, was a swedish officer, diplomat and recipient of the Order of the Sword in diamonds.
- Leijonhufvud, Swedish noble family.
