= Gabriel Leijonhufvud the Elder =

Swedish baron, officer and freemason

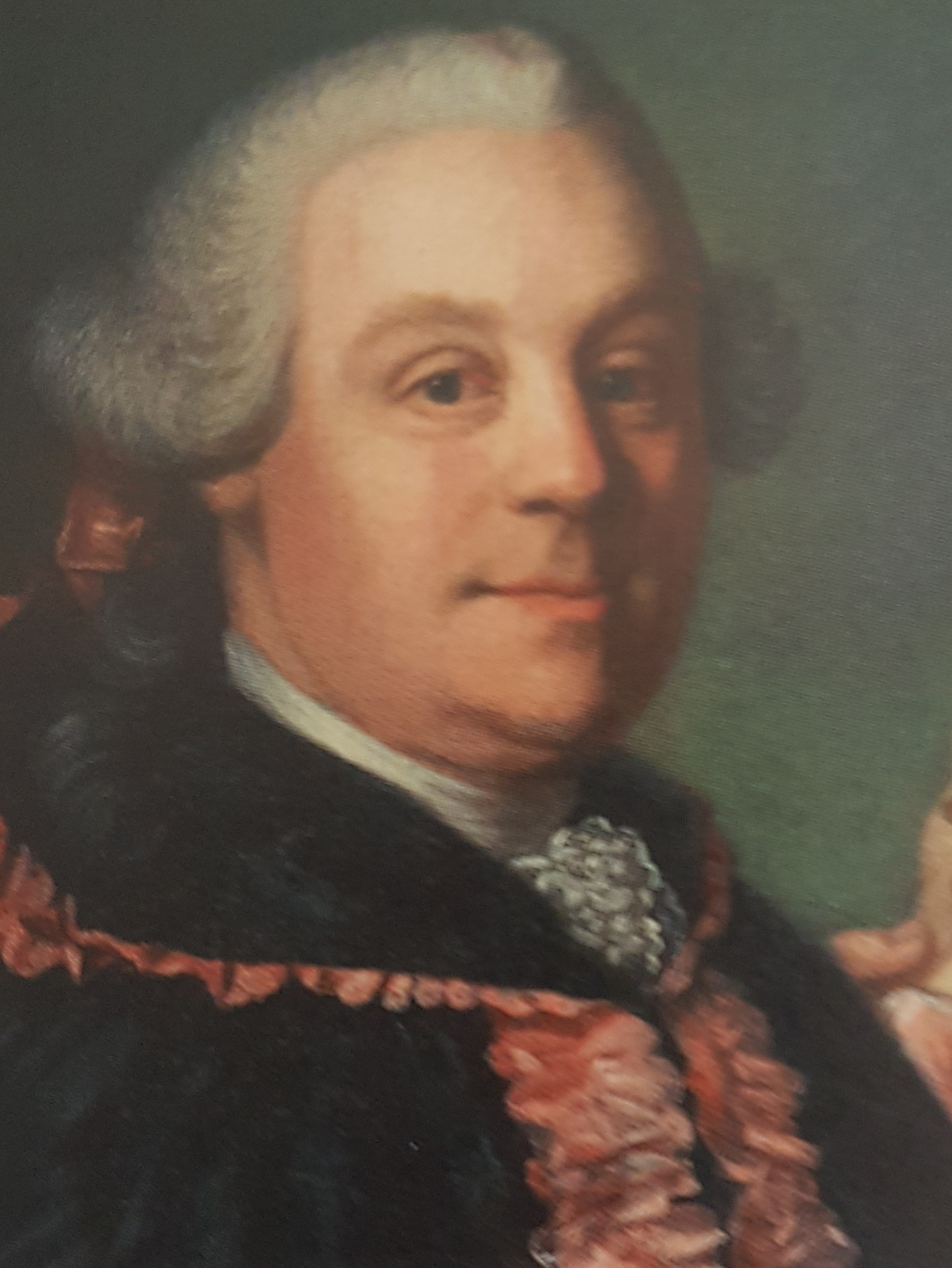
Portrait of Gabriel the Elder by unknown artist.

Axel Gabriel Leijonhufvud the Elder (16 May 1755 – 9 November 1826) was a Swedish military officer and baron. He personally witnessed the horrors of the Russo-Swedish War of 1788–1790.

== Biography ==
Gabriel was born on 16 May 1755 outside Sundsberg as the son of Baron Peter Leijonhufvud. He began his military career at the age of eight in 1763 when he was personally appointed rustmäster in the Dowager Queen's Life Regiment by the king. He was promoted in the same year to sergeant of the same regiment. He was later promoted stabsfänrik in 1770, lieutenant in 1776 and captain in 1782.

On 30 April 1783, Gabriel became a staff adjutant to the governor-general of Finland. On 30 June 1787, Gabriel was promoted to major in the Swedish Army and chief adjutant of the governor-general of Finland. After fighting in Russo-Swedish War of 1788–1790, he was promoted lieutenant colonel in the Dowager Queen's Life Regiment in 1796 and awarded Order of the Sword the in 1797. Gabriel was appointed acting governor of Uusimaa and Hämeenlinna counties in 1801. He was the acting commandant of Sveaborg (now Suomenlinna) for three months in 1807, becoming colonel-in-chief of the Sveaborg Regiment on 25 February 1808.

He was captured by the Russian Army after the surrender of Sveaborg in 1808. Gabriel was appointed colonel in the Hälsinge Regiment with expectance salary in 1812. He became director of the noble estates on 1 July 1815. Axel was appointed Member of the Board of the Masonic Children's House in 1817 and of the Court of War between 1819 and 1823. He was granted the Order of Charles XIII on 28 January 1819. He died on 9 November 1826 in Stockholm and was buried in Klara Church.

== See also ==
- Peter Leijonhufvud, (1717–1789), father of Gabriel Leijonhufvud the Elder, was a Swedish officer and civil servant.
- Gabriel Leijonhufvud the Younger, (1812–1897), son of Gabriel Leijonhufvud the Elder, was a Swedish officer, diplomat and recipient of the Order of the Sword in diamonds.
- Leijonhufvud, Swedish noble family.
