= Rustmästare =

Former Swedish rank

- Country: Sweden
- Next higher rank: Sergeant
- Next lower rank: Överfurir

Rustmästare is a former Swedish rank that literally means the one responsible for the armory.

== History and related ranks ==
=== Origin ===
Rustmästare was used, among other things, as a designation for officer rank in the artillery during the 16th century and as a non-commissioned officer title in the infantry from around 1615 to 1835.

Rustmästare was originally a non-commissioned officer rank and the holder of the rank was responsible for the care of the armory, weaponry and ammunition within a company.

=== 1833/37 ===
Holders of the rank were elevated to furir, which then was the lowest non-commissioned officer rank.

=== 1957 ===
The rank was reintroduced as the rank within the Underbefäl category.

=== 1972 ===
The rank of rustmästare was replaced with fanjunkare, and the rank was removed.

=== Reform 1972 ===
Prior to 1972, military personnel were divided into three categories Underbefäl (non-commissioned officers), Underofficerare (warrant officers) and Officerare (commissioned officers).

The Underbefäl category was split into two categories

- gruppbefäl, for national servicemen, to include:

korpral - former vicekorpral
furir - former korpral
överfurir - former furir

- plutonsofficerare to include

sergeant - former överfurir
fanjunkare - former överfurir and rustmästare

The Underofficer category was renamed kompaniofficerare to include:

fänrik - former sergeant and fanjunkare with less than 3 years of service
löjtnant - former sergeant and fanjunkare with 3-7 years of service
kapten - former sergeant, fanjunkare with a minimum of 7 years of service and förvaltare

The Officer category was renamed regementsofficerare to include

löjtnant - Löjtnant with less than 3 years of service and former fänrik
kapten - kapten with less than 11 years of service and former Löjtnant with 3-11 years of service
major - former kapten and löjtnant with a minimum of 11 years of service
överstelöjtnant - överstelöjtnant and former major
higher ranks

=== Reform 1983 ===
All categories were merged into one professional officer category with the lowest rank set to fänrik. Furir, överfurir, sergeant and fanjunkare were removed as a professional ranks. Holders of the rank fanjunkare were given the rank of löjtnant and the rest to fänrik.

== See also ==
- Military ranks of the Swedish Armed Forces
