= Leijonhufvud =

Leijonhufvud family coat of arms

Leijonhufvud (Germanized as Lewenhaupt, literally "Lionhead") is a Swedish noble family, from which some of the family members were granted baronial title. The baronial branch was 1568 granted the status of counts, and changed their family name to Lewenhaupt. There are still living members of both the branch of the family belonging to the lower nobility and the baronial one.

== Notable members ==
- Peter Leijonhufvud (1717–1789), Swedish Baron, Officer
- Gabriel Leijonhufvud the Elder (1755–1826), Swedish Baron, Officer, Freemason
- Gabriel Leijonhufvud the Younger (1812–1897), Swedish Baron, Officer, diplomat
- Axel Leijonhufvud (1933–2022), Swedish economist
- Ebba Leijonhufvud, (1595–1654), Swedish noble, Countess of Raseborg
- Margaret Leijonhufvud (1516–1551), Queen of Sweden
- Martha Leijonhufvud (1520–1584), Swedish noble
- Sigrid Leijonhufvud (1862–1937), Swedish author and historian
