= Fanjunkare =

Swedish military rank

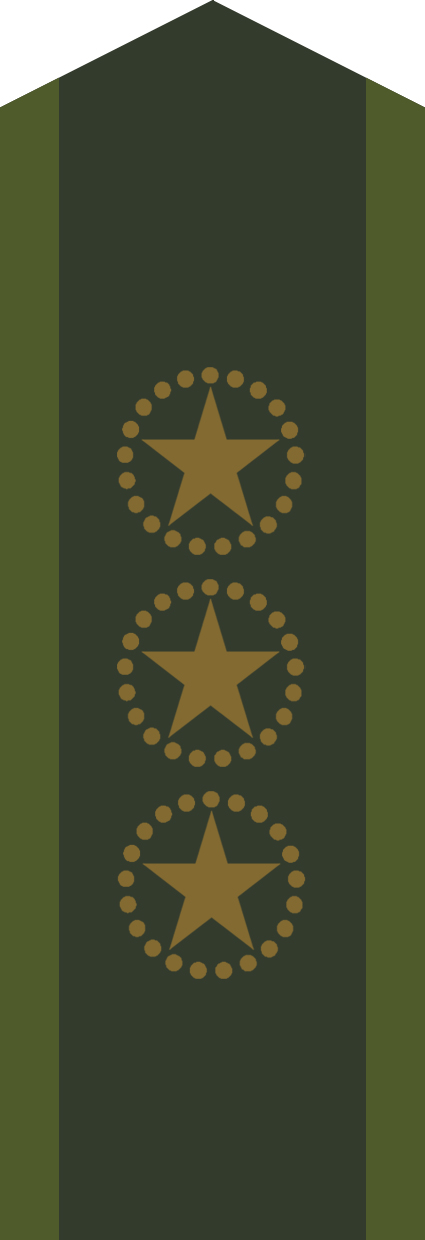
- Army Air force
- Country: Sweden
- NATO rank code: OR-7
- Next higher rank: Överfanjunkare
- Next lower rank: Översergeant

Fanjunkare (OR-7) is a Swedish military rank above Översergeant and below Överfanjunkare. The word fanjunkare is derived from German 'Fahnenjunker', and denotes a standard-bearer, hence 'Colour Sergeant'.

== History ==
Fanjunkare means "noble standard bearer" and has been used as the (highest) non-commissioned officer rank from 1837, when it finally replaced the rank of fältväbel.

Fanjunkare was established as a brevet rank for non-commissioned officers in 1806. In 1833 the rank became the senior non-commissioned rank in the Swedish allotment army. In 1837 the rank became the senior non-commissioned rank in the Swedish enlisted army. In 1925 fanjunkare was given relative rank above fänrik (second Lieutenant) and below löjtnant (lieutenant) but remained in the NCO Corps. In 1960 fanjunkare began to be appointed company commanders in the war-time organization and the rank became a warrant officer rank. Hence in 1972, professional fanjunkare were given the rank of captain, while rustmästare and överfurir's were given the rank of fanjunkare, corresponding to their duties as first sergeants. With the creation of a one-tier professional officer structure in 1983, promotion to fanjunkare only took place in the reserves or among National Servicemen. In 2009, the rank was reintroduced as a professional rank with the creation of the Special Officer Corps.

Before 1972 the equivalent of fanjunkare in the artillery was styckjunkare; a rank that goes back to the 17th century. The word comes from German stückjunker, and denotes a gentleman of ordnance, hence a "master gunner".

== Promotion ==
For promotion to fanjunkare, a minimum of four years time-in-grade as översergeant is required, although six years is preferable. A fanjunkare has the same relative rank as a kapten.

== Duties ==
- Fanjunkare are Specialist Officers at Skill Level C (Advanced).
- Functional specialists with many years of experience and in-depth knowledge; an expert in staff positions within and outside the Armed Forces within the framework of his own functional area.
- Company Sergeant Majors' supports the company commanders with planning, implementation, follow-up, as well as having a special responsibility for the combat value, discipline, morale and spirit, and experience based and tactical adaptations of the company. The CSM must be competent to lead combat fire exercises with the company, within the framework of the battalion.

== See also ==
- Military ranks of the Swedish Armed Forces
