= Furir =

Swedish military rank

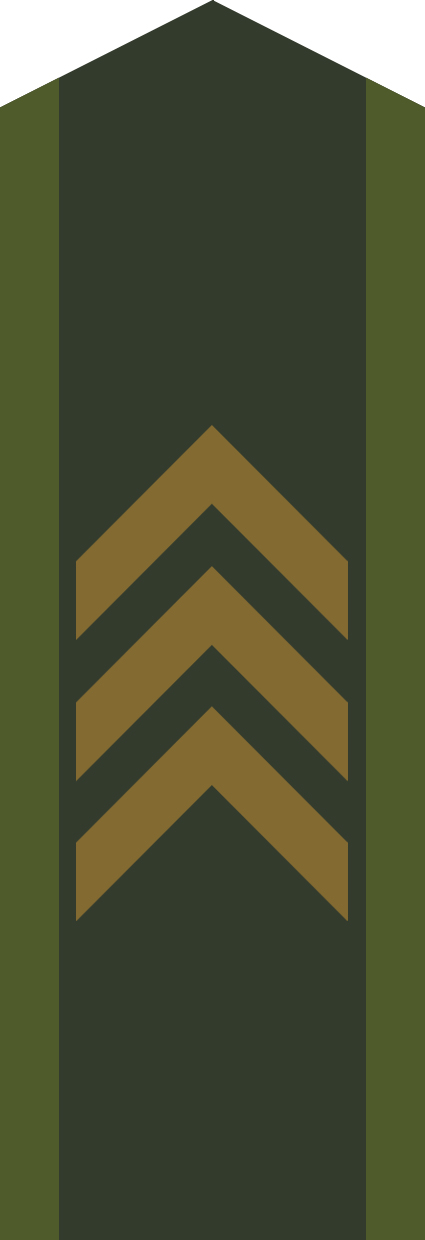
- Army
- Country: Sweden
- Service branch: Army
- NATO rank code: OR5
- Next higher rank: Överfurir
- Next lower rank: Korpral

Furir (from French fourrier, a person responsible for the feed) is a Swedish military rank (OR5) reintroduced in 2019, after having been abolished in 2009.

== Duties ==
The Furir is a Squad Leader at Skill Level B (Intermediate). Promotion from Korpral to Furir requires a minimum time-in-grade of one year.

== History ==
The responsibility of a Furir was to arrange for housing as well as the distribution of food in a Company. French court artist Jean Perréal was "fourrier" to Charlotte de Savoy and her daughter Anne, as well as to Margret of Austria, daughter of emperor Maximilian I. The rank became the lowest non-commissioned officer rank in 1833. Holders of the rank Furir were elevated to Sergeant and the rank was abolished in 1875. In 1915 the rank was reintroduced as a rank for senior squad leaders and instructors. The rank was abolished in 2009 and reintroduced ten years later.

== Swiss Army ==
Fourier German: Fourier French: Fourrier Italian: Furiere Romansh: Furier
- Dress uniform shoulder strap with the rank of Fourier

- Battledress rank insignia of Fourier
- Country: Switzerland
- Service branch: Swiss Army
- Abbreviation: German: Four; French: Four; Italian: Fur; Romansh: Fur
- Rank group: Higher non-commissioned officer
- Non-NATO rank: OR-5
- Next higher rank: Hauptfeldweibel
- Next lower rank: Feldweibel

In the Swiss Army, the Fourier (abbreviated Four) is a senior non-commissioned officer who acts as assistant to the unit commander (company). In this role, he is responsible for the company's catering and accounting. The troop accountant is his direct assistant.

The Fourier is in charge of the commissary service, which includes the troop budget (catering), troop accounting (bookkeeping, pay), and accommodation procurement. He reports to the quartermaster—an officer of the battalion staff—who acts as a supervisory body for the Fourier and reviews his work. The chef reports to the fourier.

Since January 1, 2004, a crossbar has been added to the fourier's rank insignia. This makes it clear that the fourier and the new rank of sergeant major continue to be equivalent ranks in the hierarchy. In foreign missions, he is referred to as a quartermaster sergeant (QMS). The NATO rank code is OR-7.

Earlier rank insignia

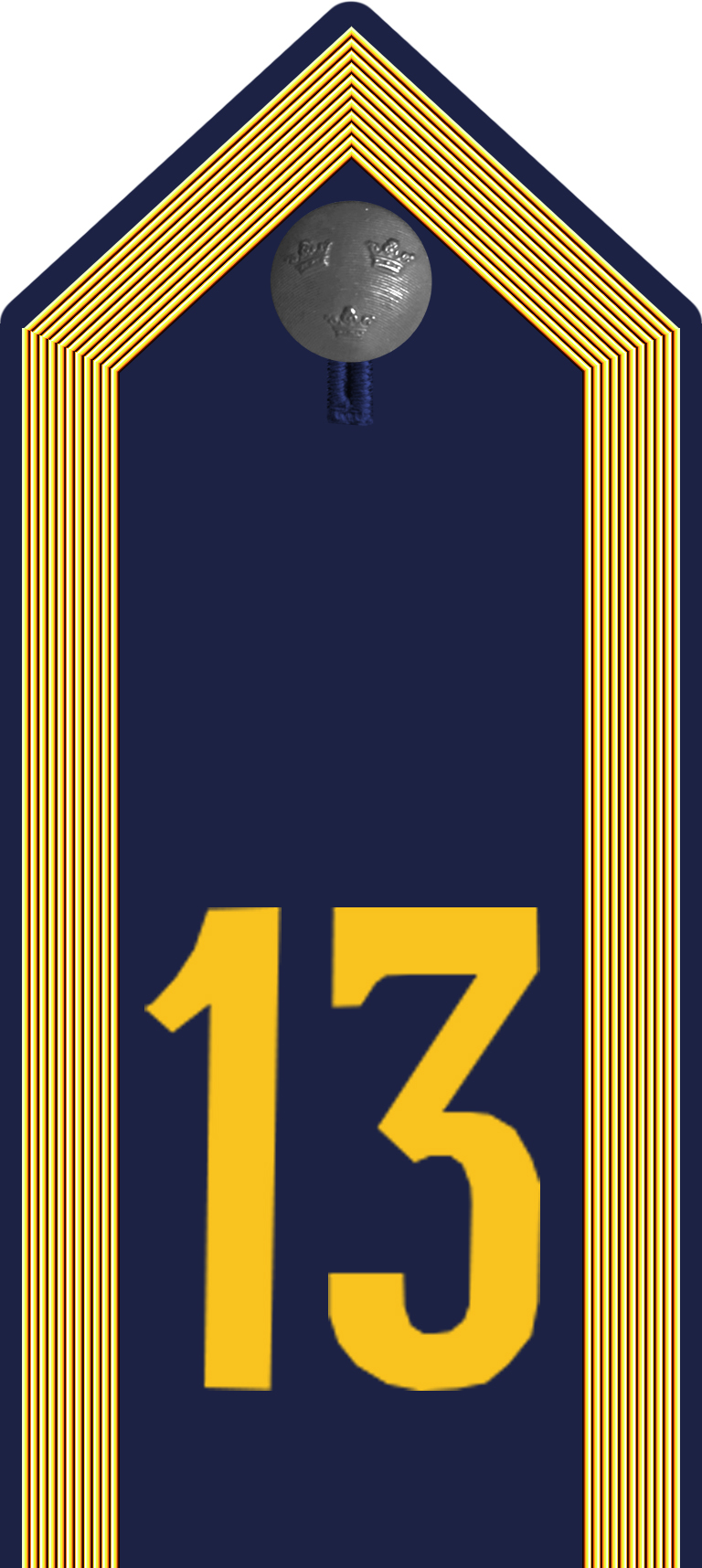
Uniform m/1910

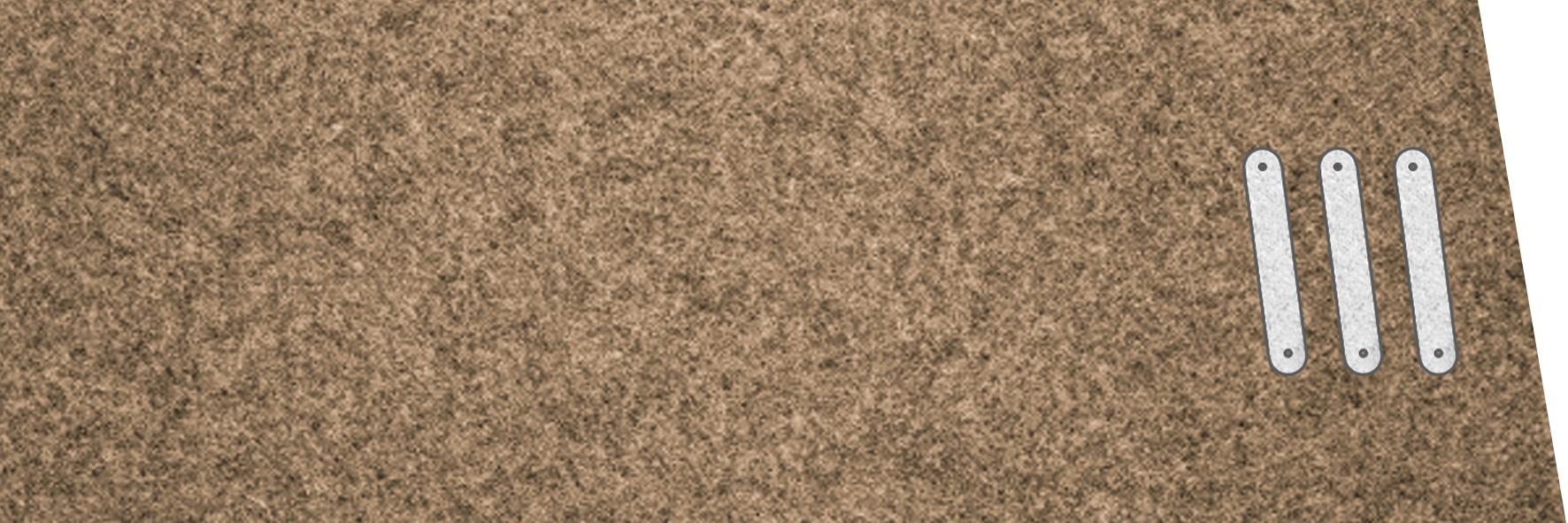
Uniform m/1923

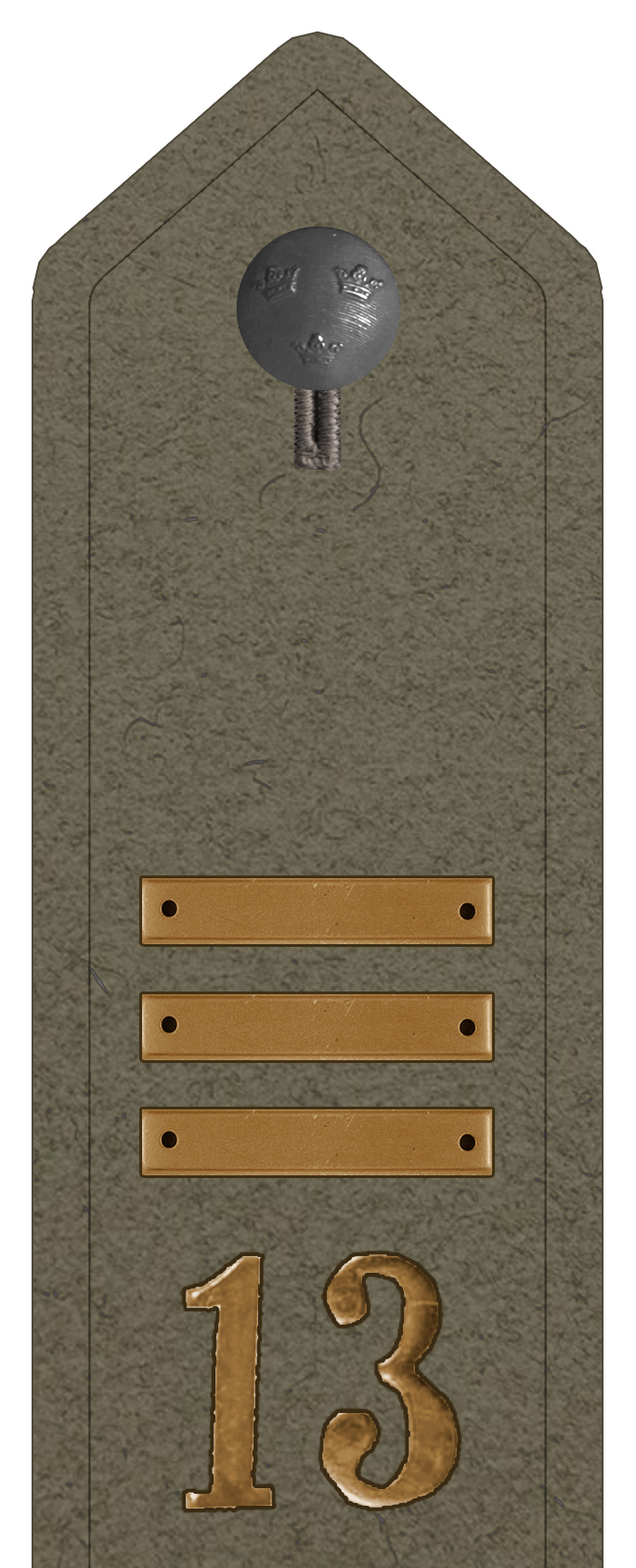
Uniform m/1939

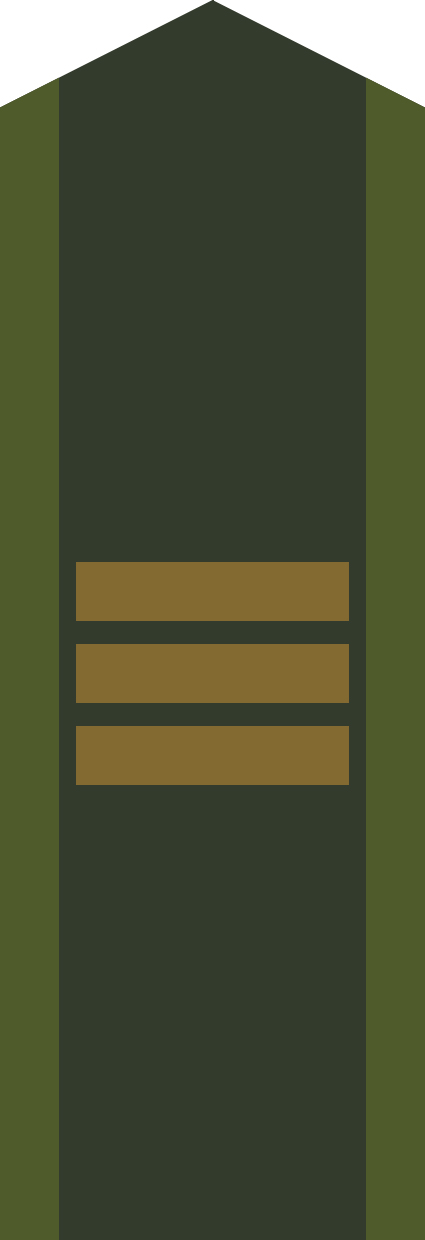
Collar patch m/1958

== See also ==
- Överfurir
