= Överfurir =

Swedish military rank

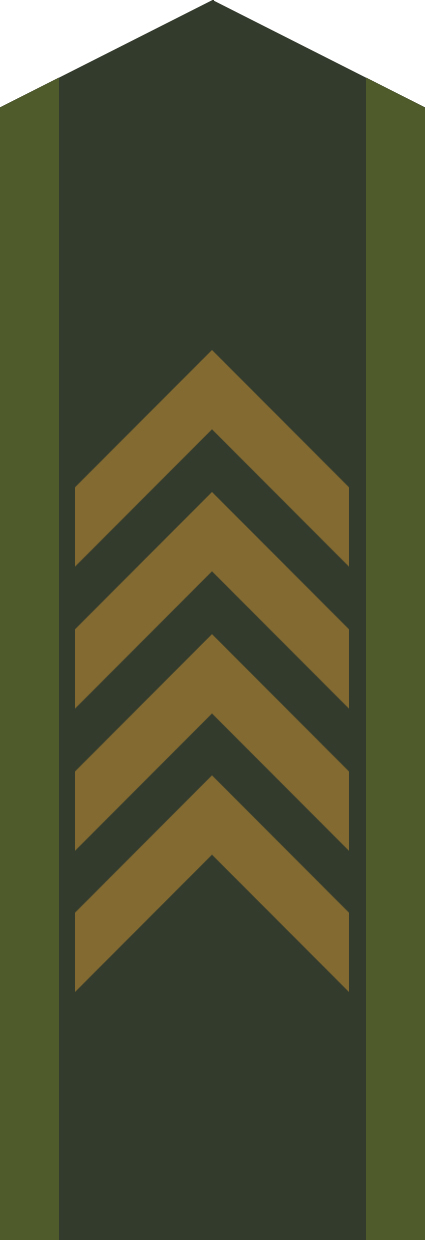
- Country: Sweden
- NATO rank code: OR5
- Next higher rank: Sergeant/Fänrik
- Next lower rank: Furir

Överfurir is a Swedish military rank (OR5) reintroduced in 2019, after having been abolished in 1991.

== Duties ==
The överfurir is a Squad Leader at Skill Level C (Advanced). Promotion from Furir to överfurir requires a minimum time-in-grade of three years, although four years is preferable.

== Earlier rank insignia ==
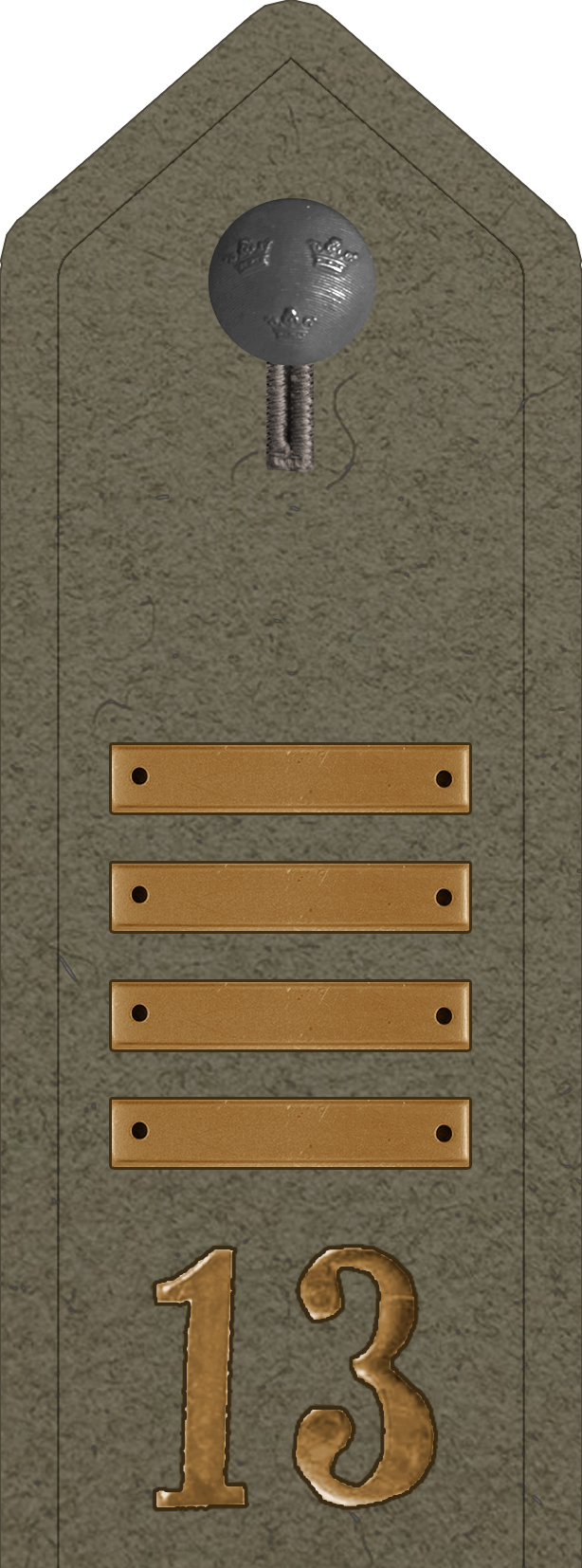
Uniform m/1939

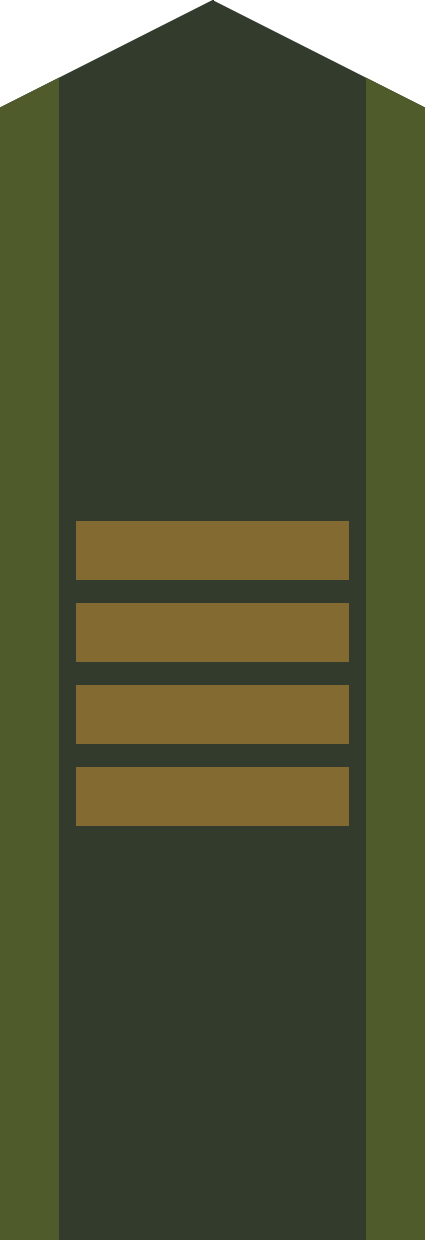
Collar patch m/1958

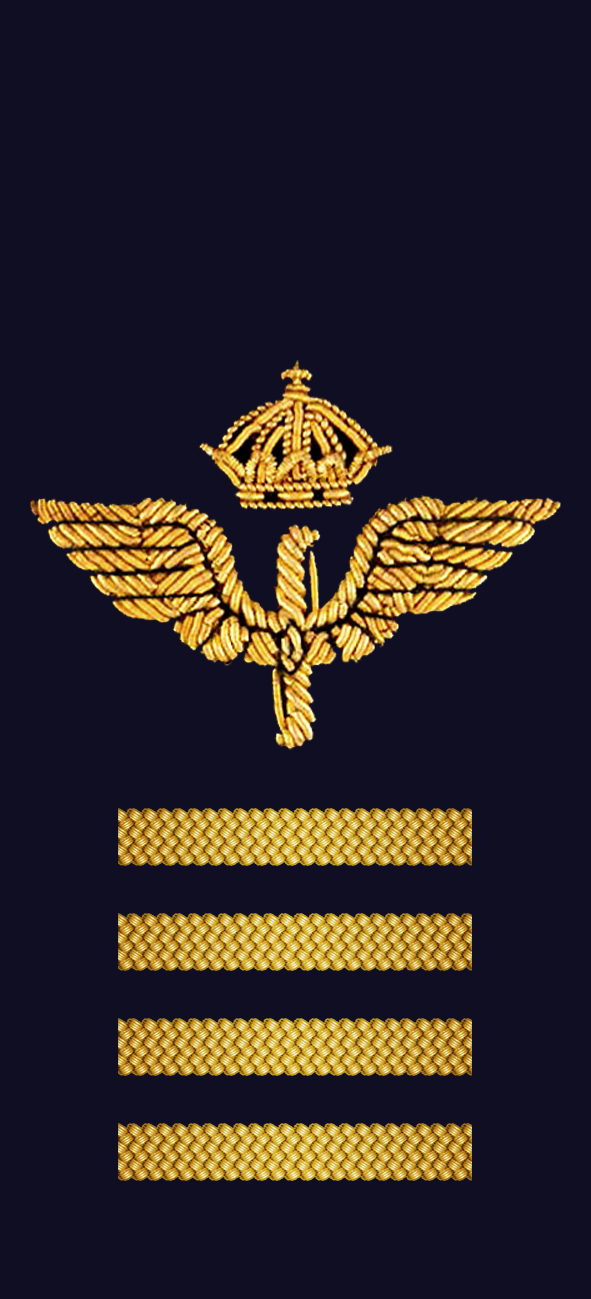
Air Force

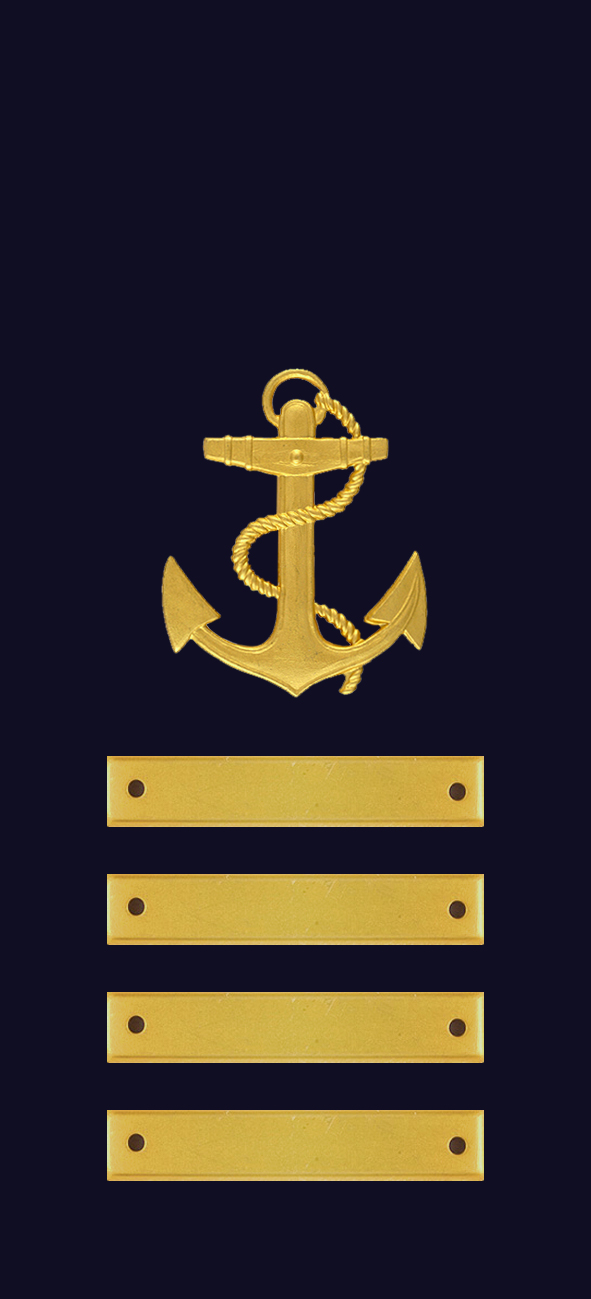
Petty Officer, Swedish Navy

== See also ==
- Military ranks of the Swedish Armed Forces
