= Sergeant (Sweden and Finland) =

Military rank in Sweden and Finland

Sergeant Kersantti (Finnish)
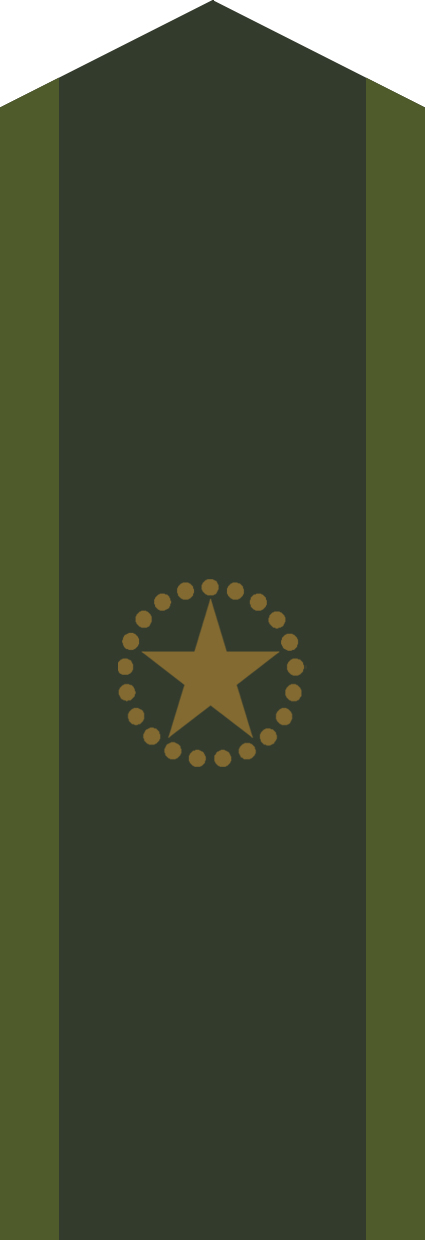
- Finnish Army (conscript or reservist) Finnish Army (professional or contract soldier) Swedish Army Finnish Navy Swedish Navy Finnish Air Force (conscript or reservist) Finnish Air Force (professional or contract soldier) Swedish Air force
- Country: Sweden; Finland
- Service branch: Army; Air force; Navy
- NATO rank code: OR-6 (SWE); OR-5 (FIN)
- Next higher rank: Översergeant (SWE); Ylikersantti (FIN)
- Next lower rank: Överfurir (SWE); Alikersantti (FIN)

Sergeant (Kersantti in Finnish) is a Swedish (OR6) and Finnish (OR5) military rank above överfurir in Sweden and alikersantti in Finland; and below översergeant in Sweden and ylikersantti in Finland.

== Finland ==
Enlisted NCOs start from alikersantti (corporal, OR4) and sergeants (OR5) are slightly more experienced or deemed better leaders. In a typical infantry company sergeants may serve as squad leaders (6-9 men), deputy platoon leaders (~30 men) or even as platoon leaders. At company level they can be company sergeants major or specialty NCOs.

In the Finnish army, conscripts are first trained for 2 months in basic training and about 30% of them are selected for NCO training (aliupseerikoulu or AUK), which lasts 4 months. Upon completion, they are promoted to alikersantti and posted to their units for 6 months, often as squad leaders and instructors. Usually, the best-performing alikersantti in a platoon is promoted to kersantti either as an award for meritorious service, or as a prerequisite for being placed into a higher-level role, such as that of a deputy platoon leader. The promotion is typically awarded a few weeks before being discharged, and it doesn't carry much practical significance in the conscript's everyday service. Like any other rank up to Major/Lieutenant Commander, the rank of sergeant can also be achieved in the reserve if certain requirements are met.

The rank of sergeant can be held by professional soldiers, contract soldiers, conscripts and reservists. Professionals in an open-ended employment contract with the Defence Forces wear a heraldic sword beneath their sergeant's insignia to differentiate themselves from conscripts and reservists who hold the same rank.

== Sweden ==
Sergeant (OR6) is the basic Specialist Officer rank in the Swedish Armed Forces. Promotion to the rank for professional soldiers requires passing out of the 1.5 year Specialist Officer Course at the Militärhögskolan Halmstad and other centers. The Sergeants are Specialist Officers Skill Level A (Basic) and will typically serve as squad leaders or platoon sergeants. The Sergeant can also be a national serviceman serving in level 7 positions. Civil servants of the Armed Forces belonging to position level 7 wear Sergeant's rank insignia when serving in uniform.

=== Earlier rank insignia ===
1910-2009

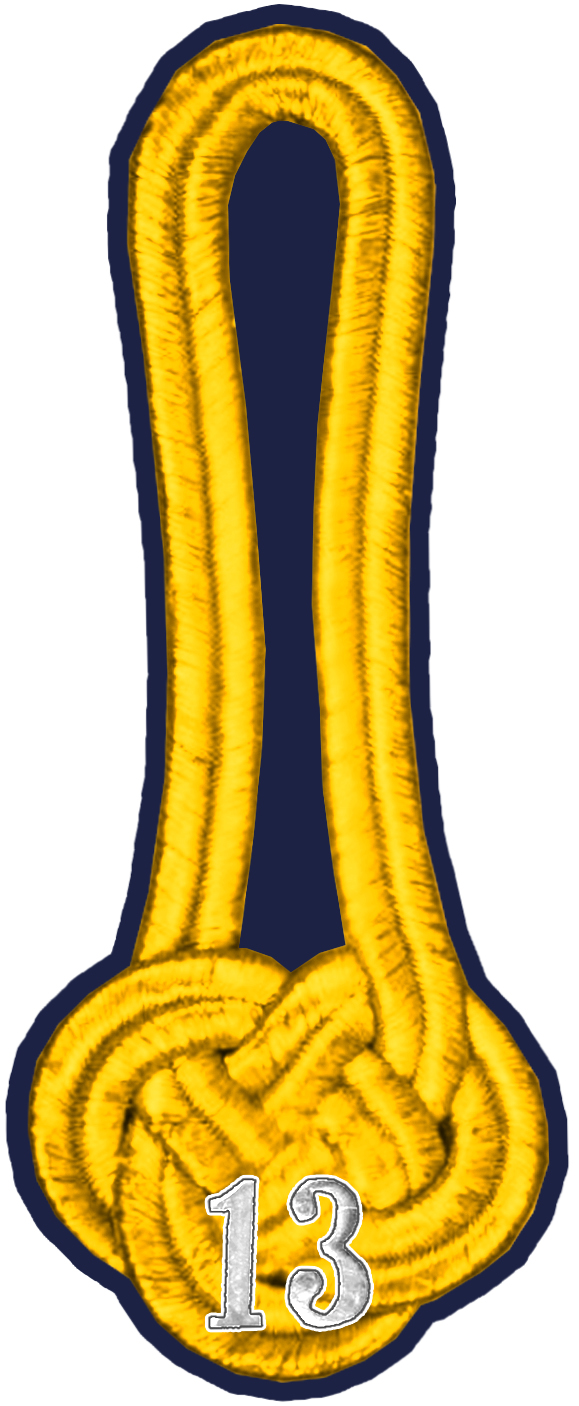
Army m/10

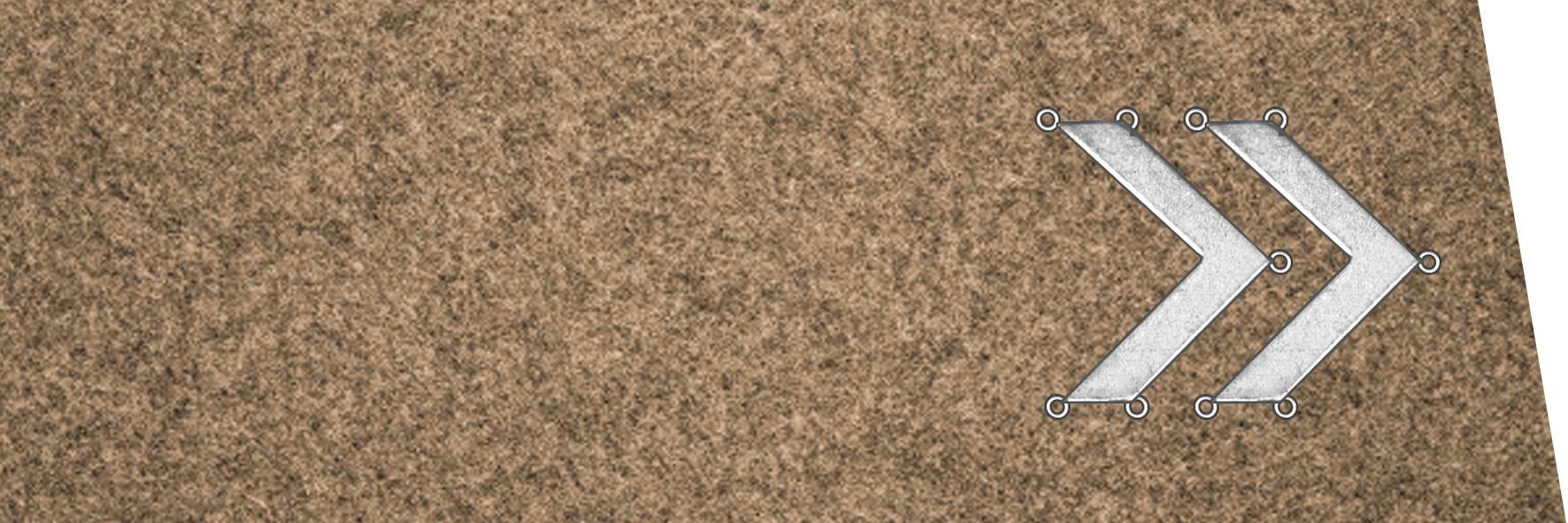
Army m/23

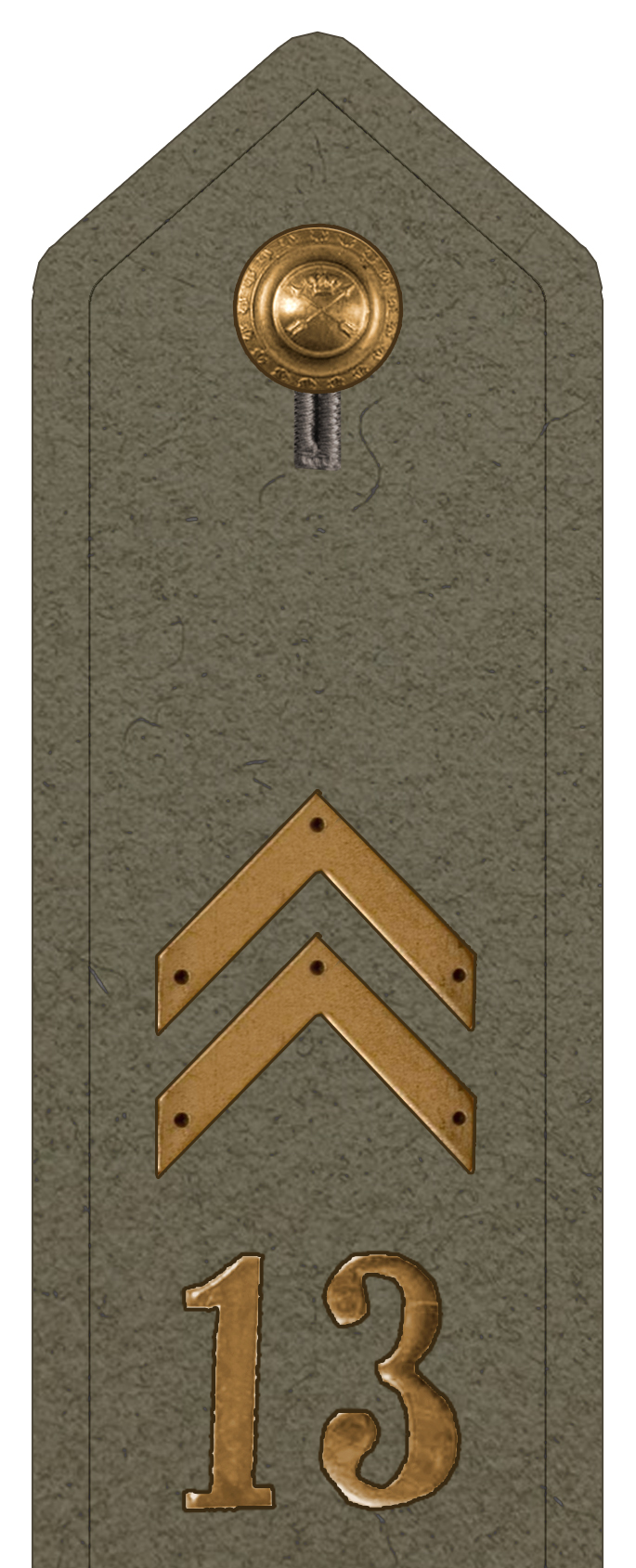
Army m/39

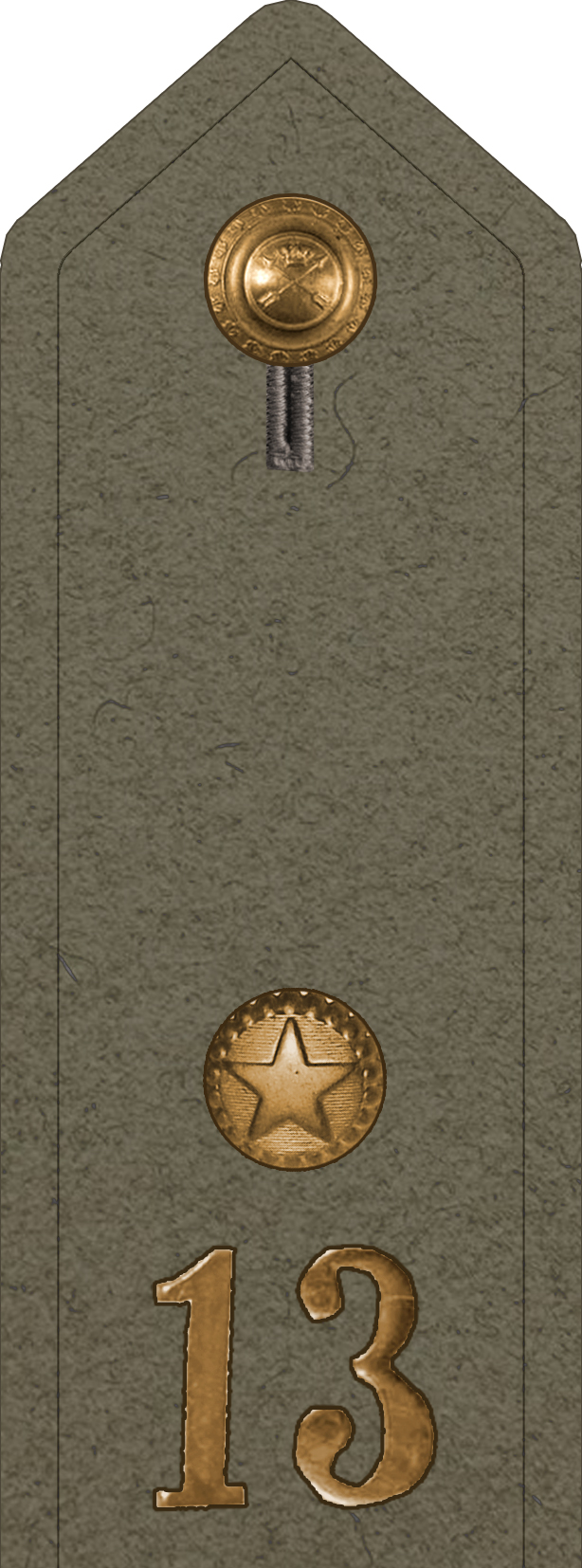
Army, rank insignia m/46

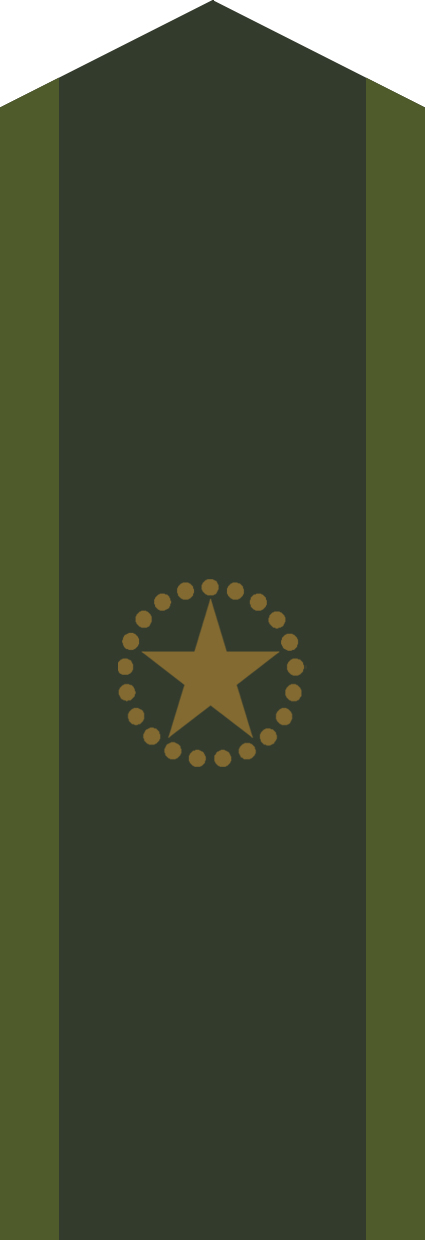
Collar patch m/58

2009-2019

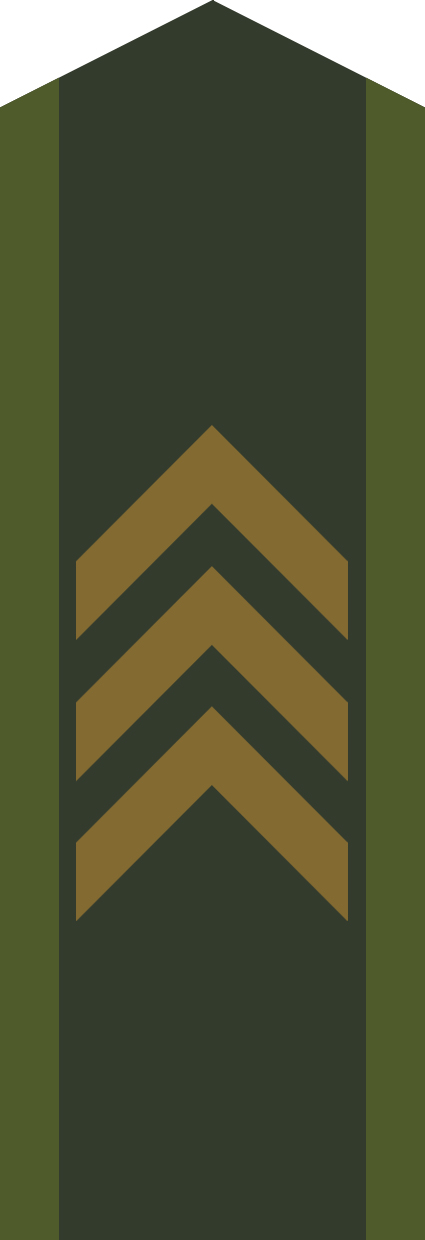
Collar patch m/58

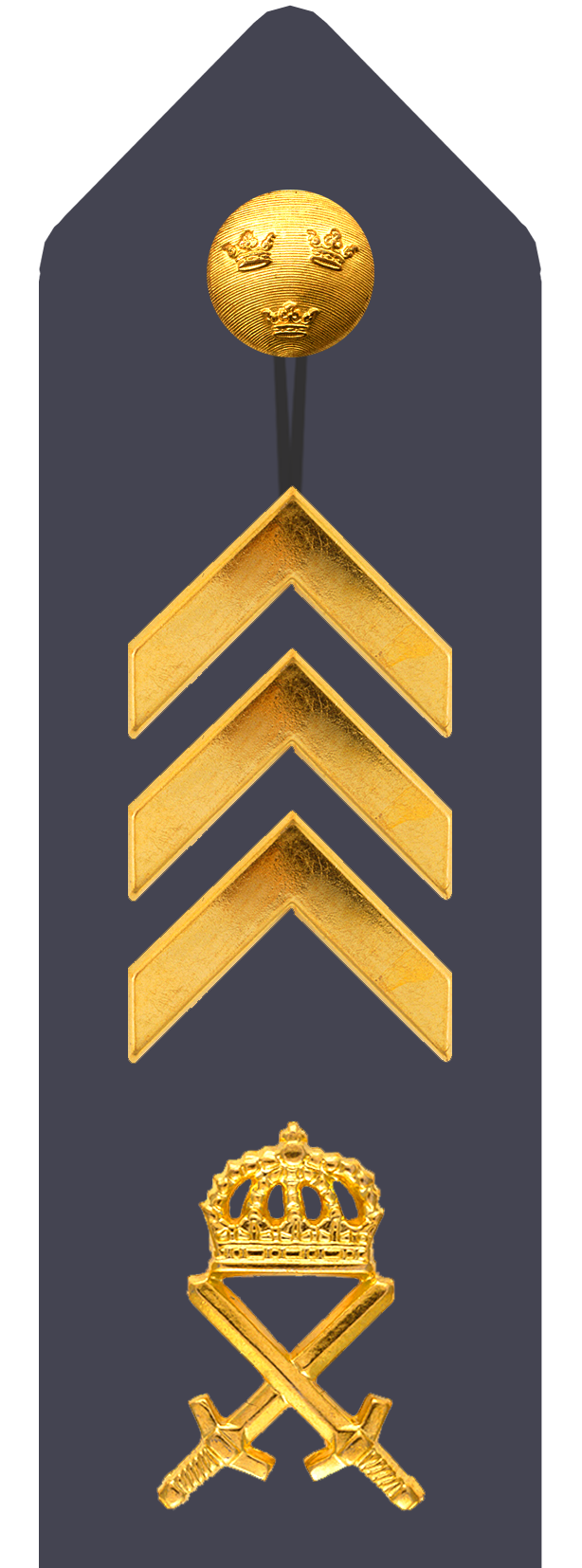
Army m/87

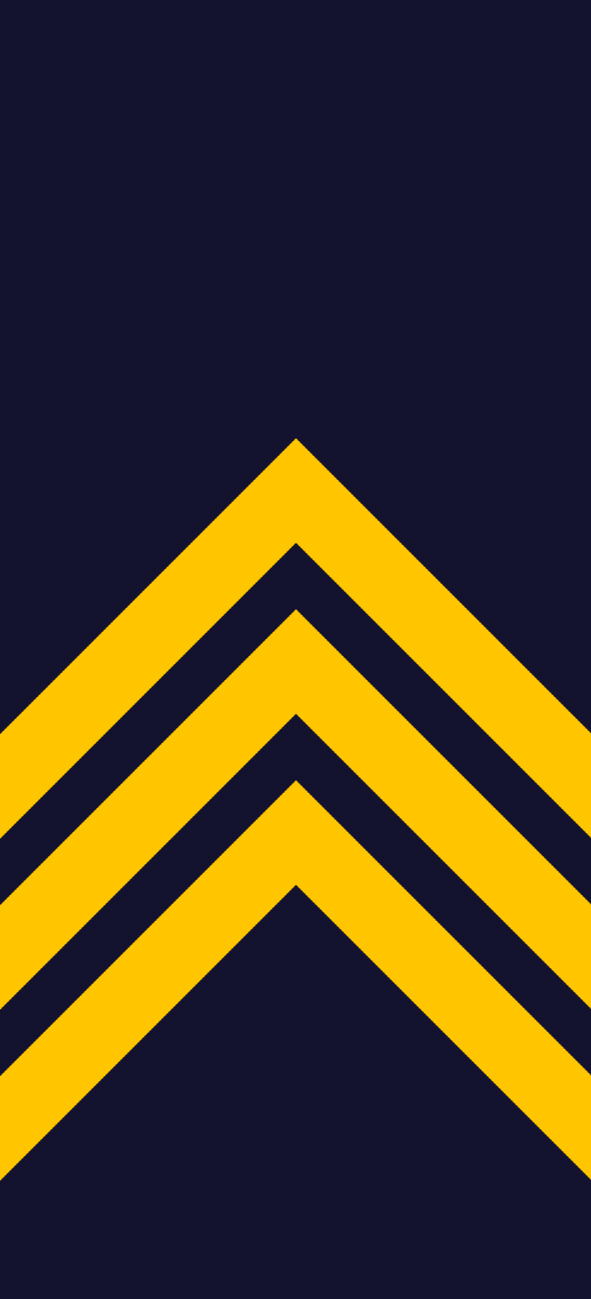
Navy (combat)

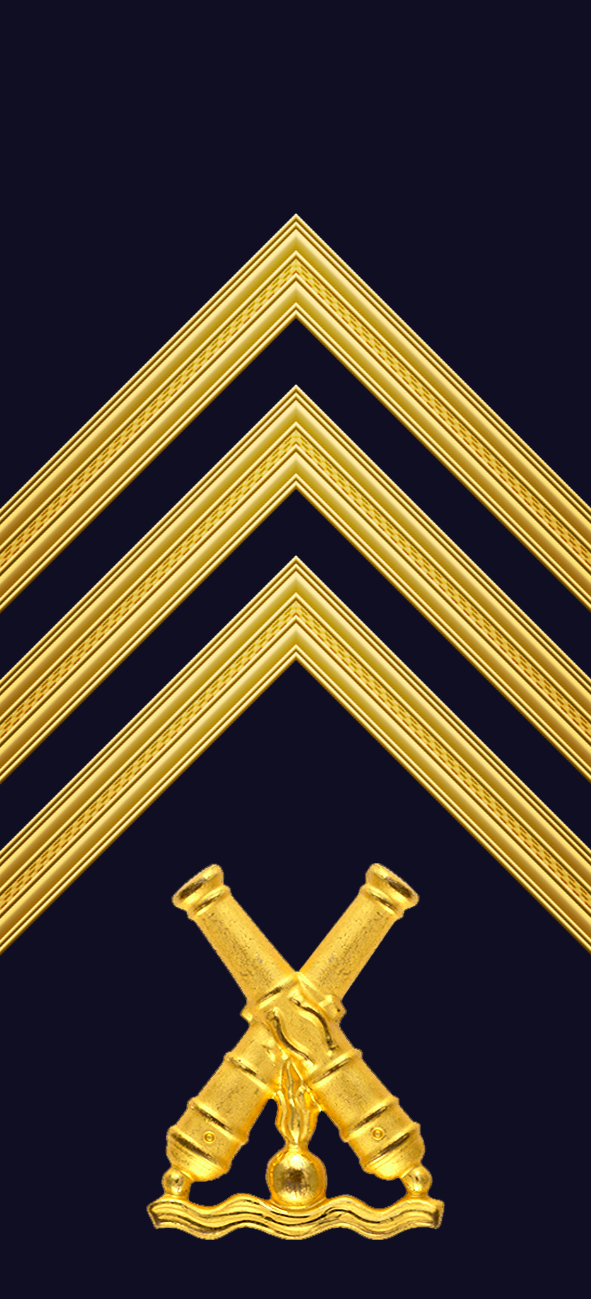
Amphibious Corps m/87

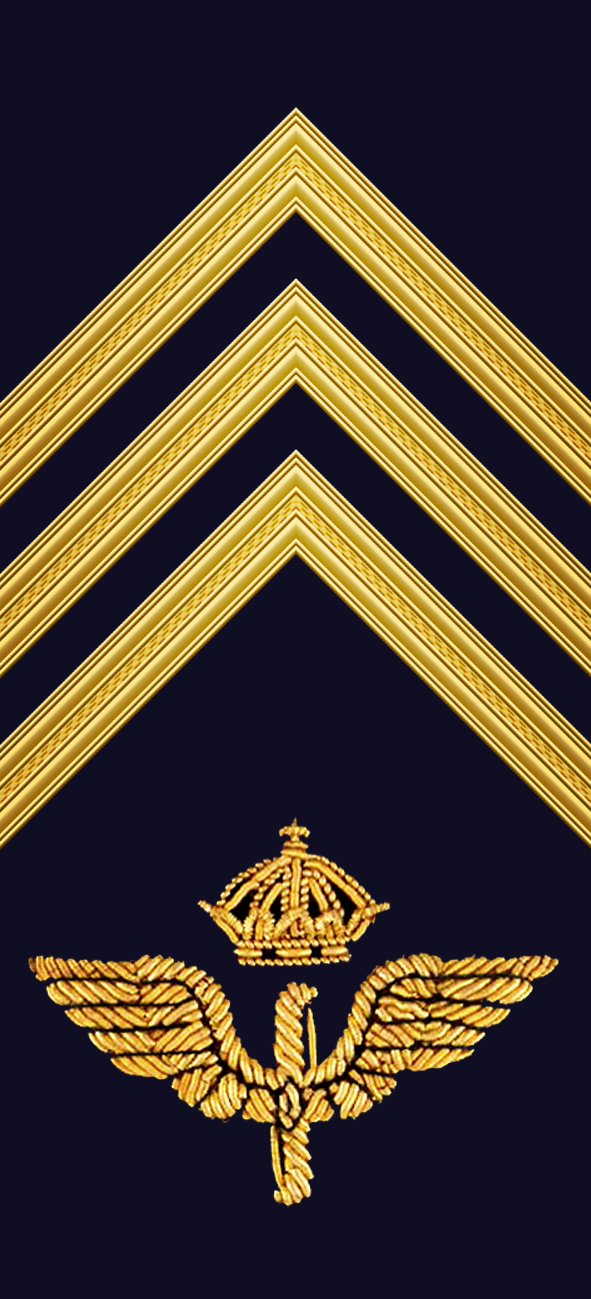
Air Force m/87

== See also ==
- Finnish military ranks
- Military ranks of the Swedish armed forces
- Swedish Armed Forces
