= Oberfähnrich zur See =

German military rank

- Country: Germany
- Service branch: German Navy
- Abbreviation: OFähnr zS
- Rank group: Non-commissioned officers
- NATO rank code: OR-7
- Formation: 1966
- Next higher rank: Stabsbootsmann
- Next lower rank: Oberbootsmann
- Equivalent ranks: Oberfähnrich

Oberfähnrich zur See (OFähnr zS or OFRZS) designates in the German Navy of the Bundeswehr a military person or member of the armed forces with the last or highest Officer Aspirant (OA – German: Offizieranwärter) rank. According to the salary class it is equivalent to the Portepeeunteroffizier ranks Hauptbootsmann (Marine) and Hauptfeldwebel of Heer or Luftwaffe.

It is also grouped as OR-7 in NATO, equivalent to First Sergeant, Master Sergeant, or Senior Chief Petty Officer in the US Armed forces, and to Warrant Officer Class 2 in the British Army and Royal Navy.

In navy context NCOs of this rank were formally addressed as Herr Oberfähnrich zur See also informally / short Oberfähnrich.

The sequence of ranks (top-down approach) in that particular group is as follows:

- OR-9: Oberstabsbootsmann / Oberstabsfeldwebel
- OR-8: Stabsbootsmann / Stabsfeldwebel
- OR-7: Oberfähnrich zur See and Hauptbootsmann / Oberfähnrich and Hauptfeldwebel
- OR-6a: Oberbootsmann / Oberfeldwebel
- OR-6b: Fähnrich zur See and Bootsmann / Fähnrich and Feldwebel

junior Rank; Oberbootsmann	Oberfähnrich zur See	senior Rank; Stabsbootsmann
junior Rank; Oberbootsmann	Hauptbootsmann	senior Rank; Stabsbootsmann

== Particularity ==
The top-down sequence of German Marine midshipman ranks is as follows:

- Oberfähnrich zur See
- Fähnrich zur See
- Seekadett

Already below the lowest officer designated rank "Seekadett" any military person, assigned to an officer career, has to wear additionally to the particular rank the two capital letters “OA”, indicating to the “Officer Aspirant” career. The "nautical star" symbolises the "OA" career.

Officer Aspirant (OA) ranks, medical career excepted

Matrose OA (OR-1)
(nautical star, waved performance)

== See also ==
- Ranks of the German Bundeswehr
- Rank insignia of the German Bundeswehr

== Bibliography ==
- Mallmann Showell, Jak P. (2002) [1999]. German Navy Handbook 1939–1945. Stroud, UK: Sutton Publishing. ISBN 0-7509-3205-8.
