= Fähnrich zur See =

- shoulder board / cuff title / mounting loop
- Country: Germany
- Service branch: German Navy
- Abbreviation: Fähnr zS
- Rank group: Non-commissioned officers
- Rank: German NCO rank
- NATO rank code: OR-6
- Next higher rank: Oberfähnrich zur See
- Next lower rank: Seekadett
- Equivalent ranks: Fähnrich

Fähnrich zur See (Fähnr zS or FRZS) designates in the German Navy of the Bundeswehr a military person or member of the armed forces with the second highest Officer Aspirant (OA – German: Offizieranwärter) rank. According to the salary class it is equivalent to the Portepeeunteroffizier ranks Bootsmann (Marine) and Feldwebel of Heer or Luftwaffe.

It is also grouped as OR-6 in NATO, equivalent to Technical Sergeant, Staff Sergeant, or Petty Officer First Class in the US Armed forces, and to Petty officer in the British Army and Royal Navy.

In navy context NCOs of this rank were formally addressed as Herr/ Frau Fähnrich zur See also informally / short Fähnrich.

The sequence of ranks (top-down approach) in that particular group is as follows:
Portepeeunteroffiziere

- OR-9: Oberstabsbootsmann / Oberstabsfeldwebel
- OR-8: Stabsbootsmann / Stabsfeldwebel
- OR-7: Oberfähnrich zur See and Hauptbootsmann / Oberfähnrich and Hauptfeldwebel
- OR-6a: Oberbootsmann / Oberfeldwebel
- OR-6b: Fähnrich zur See and Bootsmann / Fähnrich and Feldwebel

Preceded by junior Rank; Obermaat	Fähnrich zur See Bootsmann	Succeeded by 'senior Rank; Hauptbootsmann'

== Career and rank insignia ==
Matrose OA (OR/1) / with nautical star

A Fähnrich zur See of the Deutsche Marine is a soldier who serves in the ranks, first as Seekadett (OR-4, comparable to the junior non-commissioned officer rank Unteroffizier), then in subsequent grades: Fähnrich zur See (OR-6, equivalent to Bootsmann), and Oberfähnrich zur See (OR-7 equivalent to Hauptbootsmann).

In the Deutsche Marine, an officer candidate (German: Offiziersanwärter) can be promoted to the rank of Fähnrich zur See after 21 months of service. The equivalent in Heer and Luftwaffe is "Fähnrich".

An officer candidate's career is indicated by the enlisted rank with the golden nautical star on the shoulder strap and sleeve in the Deutsche Marine, and a thin silver cord on the shoulder strap in Heer and Luftwaffe.

Already below the lowest officer designated rank "Seekadett" any military person, assigned to an officer career, has to wear additionally to the particular rank the two capital letters “OA”, indicating to the “Officer Aspirant” career. The "nautical star" symbolizes the "OA" career.

from 1956	German Navy
Distinction	Oberfähnrich (Senior cadet sergeant)	Fähnrich (Cadet sergeant)	Fahnenjunker (Officer cadet senior grade)	Oberfähnrich (Senior aviation cadet)	Fähnrich (Aviation cadet)	Fahnenjunker (Officer cadet senior grade)	Oberfähnrich zur See (Senior midshipman)	Fähnrich zur See (Midshipman)	Seekadett (Naval cadet)
Rangcode	(OR-7)	(OR-6)	(OR-5)	(OR-7)	(OR-6)	(OR-5)	(OR-7)	(OR-6)	(OR-5)
NATO	Cadet sergeant	Midshipman
USAF	Aviation cadet auch Warrant Officer
RAF	Acting pilot officer

== See also ==
- Ranks of the German Bundeswehr
- Rank insignia of the German Bundeswehr
