= Oberfähnrich =

Rank in the German Army

- Heer and Luftwaffe shoulder insignia
- Country: Germany
- Service branch: German Army; German Air Force
- Abbreviation: OFähnr
- NATO rank code: OR-7
- Pay grade: A 8Z
- Formation: 1957 (current)
- Next higher rank: Stabsfeldwebel
- Next lower rank: Oberfeldwebel
- Equivalent ranks: Hauptfeldwebel; Oberfähnrich zur See

Oberfähnrich (OFähnr or OFR) designates in the Heer of the Bundeswehr a military person or member of the armed forces with the last or highest Officer Aspirant (OA – de: Offizieranwärter) rank. According to the salary class it is equivalent to the Portepeeunteroffizier ranks Hauptfeldwebel of Heer or Luftwaffe, and Hauptbootsmann of Marine.

It is also grouped as OR-7 in NATO, equivalent to Sergeant 1st Class, Master Sergeant, or Chief Petty Officer in the US Armed forces, and to Warrant Officer Class 2 in the British Army and Royal Navy.

In navy context NCOs of this rank were formally addressed as Herr Oberfähnrich also informally / short Oberfähnrich.

In the German Army the rank insignia is the same as that for Hauptfeldwebel except the lace trim is silver instead of gold.

The sequence of ranks (top-down approach) in that particular group is as follows:

- OR-9: Oberstabsfeldwebel / Oberstabsbootsmann
- OR-8: Stabsfeldwebel / Stabsbootsmann
- OFD: Oberfähnrich and Hauptfeldwebel / Oberfähnrich zur See and Hauptbootsmann
- OR-6: Oberfeldwebel / Oberbootsmann
- OR-6: Fähnrich and Feldwebel / Fähnrich zur See and Bootsmann

== See also ==
- Rank insignia of the German Bundeswehr
