= Rank insignia of the Bundeswehr =

Military insignia

The rank insignia of the Federal Defence Forces (Bundeswehr) indicate rank and branch of service in the German Army (Heer), German Air Force (Luftwaffe), or the German Navy (Marine).

They are regulated by the "presidential order on rank designation and military uniform". The 'ZDv-37/10 – Anzugsordnung für Soldaten der Bundeswehr' (ZDv: Zentrale Dienstvorschrift - Central Service Provision) gives the dress order and design variations. Further, the Federal Office of Equipment, IT, and In-Service Support of the Bundeswehr (Bundesamt für Ausrüstung, Informationstechnik und Nutzung der Bundeswehr) provides numerous details.

== History ==
In 2020, the German ministry of defence considered introducing feminine forms of rank titles, but ultimately did not introduce the changes.

In October 2021, the ranks Korporal and Stabskorporal were introduced by the Bundeswehr as the new most senior ranks for enlisted men, senior to Oberstabsgefreiter. This was done to allow soldiers who perform well and want to take more responsibility to reach a higher pay grade (A6 for Korporal, that is the same pay grade as the NCO rank Stabsunteroffizier (OR-5)) and thus make the career in the enlisted ranks more attractive.

== Types ==
According to the rank system, the different types of rank insignias might be distinguished as follows:

- Shoulder straps or boards
- Cuff titles or sleeve insignias
- Mounting loops or straps (in German: Aufziehschlaufen)

== Basic structure of shoulder straps and sleeve insignias ==
The rank insignias of all service personnel will be explained initially on the example of shoulder straps to the basic uniform or everyday uniform in order provide a general overview.

As to naval persons in uniform there will be additionally depicted sleeve insignias on the uniform jacket. Pertaining army persons in uniform there will be shown next shoulder straps of the uniform jacket. Variations of the first instance depicted rank insignias will be explained in more detail.

=== Commissioned officer ranks ===
The rank insignia of commissioned officers.

| NATO code | OF-10 | OF-9 | OF-8 | OF-7 | OF-6 | OF-5 | OF-4 | OF-3 | OF-2 | | OF-1 |
|---|---|---|---|---|---|---|---|---|---|---|---|---|
| German Army |
| German Army | | General | Generalleutnant | Generalmajor | Brigadegeneral | Oberst | Oberstleutnant | Major | Stabshauptmann | Hauptmann | Oberleutnant | Leutnant |
| German Navy |
| German Navy | | Admiral | Vizeadmiral | Konteradmiral | Flottillenadmiral | Kapitän zur See | Fregattenkapitän | Korvettenkapitän | Stabskapitänleutnant | Kapitänleutnant | Oberleutnant zur See | Leutnant zur See |
| German Air Force |
| German Air Force | | General | Generalleutnant | Generalmajor | Brigadegeneral | Oberst | Oberstleutnant | Major | Stabshauptmann | Hauptmann | Oberleutnant | Leutnant |
| NATO code | OF-10 | OF-9 | OF-8 | OF-7 | OF-6 | OF-5 | OF-4 | OF-3 | OF-2 | | OF-1 |

=== Other ranks ===
The rank insignia of non-commissioned officers and enlisted personnel.

| NATO code | OR-9 | OR-8 | OR-7 | OR-6 | | OR-5 | | OR-4 | | | | OR-3 | | OR-2 | OR-1 |
|---|---|---|---|---|---|---|---|---|---|---|---|---|---|---|---|
| German Army |
| German Army | Oberstabsfeldwebel | Stabsfeldwebel | Hauptfeldwebel | Oberfeldwebel | Feldwebel | Stabsunteroffizier | Unteroffizier | Stabskorporal | Korporal | Oberstabsgefreiter | Stabsgefreiter | Hauptgefreiter | Obergefreiter | Gefreiter | Soldat |
| German Army (Officer designate) |
| German Army (Officer designate) | | | Oberfähnrich | Fähnrich | | Fahnenjunker |
| German Navy | | | | | | | | | | | | | | | No insignia |
| German Navy | Oberstabsbootsmann | Stabsbootsmann | Hauptbootsmann | Oberbootsmann | Bootsmann | Obermaat | Maat | Stabskorporal | Korporal | Oberstabsgefreiter | Stabsgefreiter | Hauptgefreiter | Obergefreiter | Gefreiter | Matrose |
| German Navy (Officer designate) |
| German Navy (Officer designate) | | | Oberfähnrich zur See | Fähnrich zur See | | Seekadett |
| German Air Force |
| German Air Force | Oberstabsfeldwebel | Stabsfeldwebel | Hauptfeldwebel | Oberfeldwebel | Feldwebel | Stabsunteroffizier | Unteroffizier | Stabskorporal | Korporal | Oberstabsgefreiter | Stabsgefreiter | Hauptgefreiter | Obergefreiter | Gefreiter | Flieger |
| German Air Force (Officer designate) |
| German Air Force (Officer designate) | | | Oberfähnrich | Fähnrich | | Fahnenjunker |
| NATO code | OR-9 | OR-8 | OR-7 | OR-6 | | OR-5 | | OR-4 | | | | OR-3 | | OR-2 | OR-1 |

=== Variations ===
Army- and Air Force persons in uniform of the commissioned officers rank group may carry in line with ZDv 37/10 self-procured hand stitched rank insignias (image: d.) instead of the metallic version (image: e.). However, this type of rank insignias is rather seldom in practice. Beside the rank insignia on light-grey shoulder straps, as shown above, there is to army persons in uniform a version (see image a.) on dark grey cloth. This version of shoulder straps will be worn to uniform shirt and overcoat.

Naval persons in uniform, of the enlisted personnel rank group, wear relatively seldom the dark blue jacket with the above indicated cuff titles, because enlisted mariner in the age below 30 years prefer to wear the white shirt or blue shirt instead of the uniform jacked. Sleeve insignias on shirts more simple, but pertaining form and dimensions identically to those on jackets.

a. Dark grey shoulder strap - Heer (here: Stabsunteroffizier armored corps)

b. Cuff title to the dark blue seaman shirt (here: Oberstabsgefreiter with a seamanship rating)

c. Cuff title to the dark white seaman shirt (here: Obergefreiter with a control & communications rating)

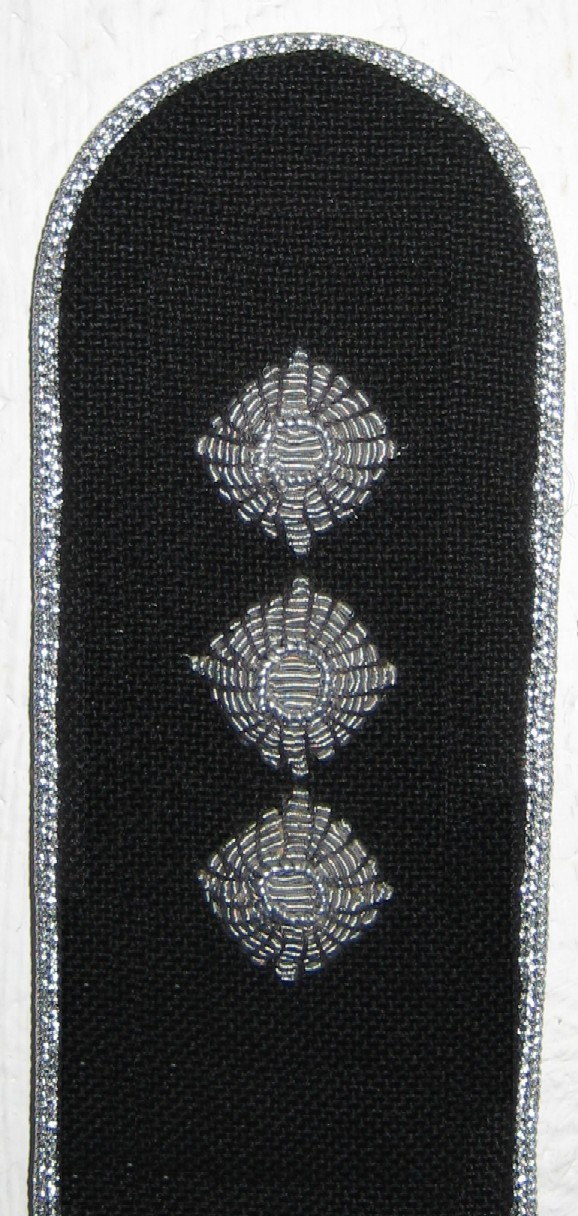
d. Shoulder strap dress uniform strap (hand stitched version) - Heer (here: captain - OF2)

e. Shoulder strap basic form (metallic version) - Heer (here: lieutenant - OF1b infantry)

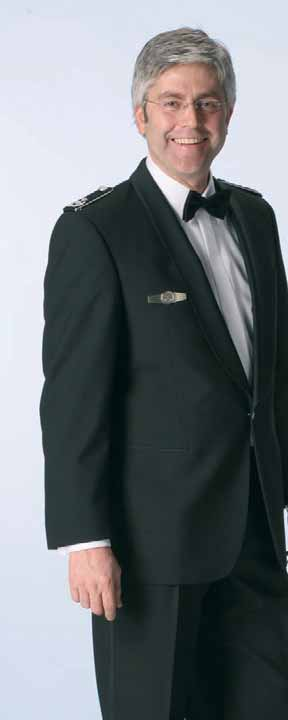
Mess Dress uniform, male Heer

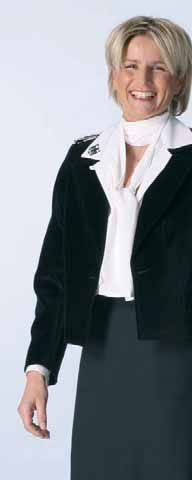
Mess Dress uniform, female Heer

In the place of stripes, with parts of metallic spinning fibers wire yarn, the oblique chevrons are made from golden-yellow or steel-blue spinning fibers without any metallic parts of wire yarn (see images b and c.). For Army and Air Force personnel in Bundeswehr dress uniform, as well as for all female soldiers, shoulder straps are mandatory. However, male naval persons in uniform wear cuff titles, known from the jacket.

=== Particularities ===
Deviating from the description above, naval enlisted personnel of the Guard Battalion of the MOD-Germany (de: Wachbataillon beim BMVg) are exempted from wearing any sleeve rating mark on all uniforms, instead wearing their insignia on shoulder boards.

In opposition to the ZDv 37/10, in representative military units (e.g. Guard Battalion of the MOD-Germany and Staff Military Band of the Armed Forces) for enlisted personnel and non commissioned officers the background of the basic uniform gorget patches shows the specific corps colour of the appropriate armed service, special troop, corps or assignment.

Also in deviation from the description above, on the service jacket and skiing blouse colour pipings or cops background colour on gorget patches are dropped.

== Basic form of mounting straps ==
Mounting straps or loops (Aufschiebeschlaufen in German) are in principle identical to the design of the shoulder boards depicted above. From this point of view it is sufficient to demonstrate the different versions of the design, instead of showing a complete list. Officially-procured mounting straps are weaved. The field-uniform type of mounting straps, used most, have black or golden emblems on stone-grey/olive-coloured base textiles. Soldiers of the lowest ranks generally do not wear shoulder straps. Exceptions to this are comparatively-low-ranked NCOs, Mate aspirants, and Boatswain cadets, as well as wearers of stone-grey/olive Luftwaffe uniforms that do not feature badges with the double wings.

| Rank | Person in uniform | | | Notes |
|---|---|---|---|---|
| Enlisted personnel | Aufschiebeschlaufe Feldanzug Heeresuniformträger Jägertruppe | Aufschiebeschlaufe Feldanzug Dienstanzug Luftwaffenuniformträger | Aufschiebeschlaufe Feldanzug Marineuniformträger | On army uniform, the shoulder strap loops consist of a base textile the colour of the collar patch with markings in 0.4-cm-wide coupled flat thread. Luftwaffe shoulder straps of this type are the only type to have the Luftwaffe double wings woven in. These are longer than all the other types used by the Luftwaffe. |
| Non-commissioned officers | Aufschiebeschlaufe Feldanzug Heeresuniformträger Stabsunteroffizier Fernmeldetruppe | Aufschiebeschlaufe Feldanzug Dienstanzug Luftwaffenuniformträger Oberstabsfeldwebel | Aufschiebeschlaufe Feldanzug Marineuniformträger Bootsmann | |
| Staff officers | Aufschiebeschlaufe Feldanzug Heeresuniformträger Oberst Heereslogistiktruppe | Aufschiebeschlaufe Feldanzug Dienstanzug Luftwaffenuniformträger Oberst | Aufschiebeschlaufe Feldanzug Marineuniformträger Fregattenkapitän | This shoulder strap is also worn on the Battle Dress Uniform featuring 3-colour Flecktarn camouflage. Epaulettes and armbands on the Battle Dress Uniforms of personnel whose ranks feature stars are only worn by some comparatively-low-ranked Officer aspirants. |
| General ranks Flag officers | Aufschiebeschlaufe Feldanzug Heeresuniformträger General | Aufschiebeschlaufe Feldanzug Luftwaffenuniformträger Generalleutnant | Aufschiebeschlaufe Feldanzug Marineuniformträger Admiral | |

=== Variations which conform to regulations ===
Similar mounting straps exist for differently-coloured uniform parts as well as for Army, Air Force, and Navy personnel in uniform. Army personnel in uniform, for example, wear black mounting straps with bright-grey emblems (gold-yellow for Generals) on the epaulettes of grey shirts (see image a.).

For naval personnel, dark-blue mounting straps are widespread, particularly on the ship-parka (see image c.).

For Air Force pilots' flying suits there exists a version of the mounting straps with bright-grey emblems (gold-yellow for Generals) on dark-blue base textile (without double-wing). The Air Force double-wing is mounted to other parts of the flying suit, and is intentionally omitted on mounting straps.

a. Black base textile with bright-grey emblems – Heer (here: colonel NBC defense corps, grey pullover)

b. Dark-blue base textile with bright-grey emblems – Air Force (here: captain grey-blue flying suit)

c. Dark-blue base textile with gold-yellow emblems – Navy (here: captain lieutenant, ship-parka)

=== Versions being phased out ===
By amendment of the "Presidential Order on Rank Designation and Uniform of Soldiers" on February 7, 1996, it was decided that the silver-coloured rank insignia on the camouflage fighting suit (de: Kampfanzug Tarndruck) would become obsolete. They will be replaced by black-coloured ones.

According to the ZDv 37/10, ”Until official procurement of the newly designed olive-green mounting loops with black-coloured rank insignias (for enlisted personnel, non commissioned officers, and commissioned officers including colonels of the Heer and Luftwaffe), the old-fashioned mounting loop with grey-colour rank insignias may be worn."

In practice, the replacement of the obsolete grey-coloured mounting loops by the new fashioned black-colour version is almost complete. However, on uni-coloured flying suits of army pilots and aviation technicians, mounting loops with grey-coloured rank insignias conform to the regulations.

a. Mounting loop with bright-grey emblem on stone-grey base textile – Heer (here: Oberstabsfeldwebel renonnaissance corps)

b. Mounting loop with bright-grey emblem on stone-olive base textile – Luftwaffe (here: lieutenant colonel)

=== Tolerated versions ===
The following tables below depict mounting loops that are used in practice in conjunction with the 3- or 5 colour flecktarn fighting suit. However, these particular versions are not mentioned or depicted in the ZDv 37/10, nor are they officially procured. Mounting loops in 3- and 5-colour flecktarn are de facto in contravention of the Presidential Order on Rank Designation and Uniform of Soldiers, and may be only procured individually. However, the mounting loops in 3- and 5 colour flecktarn with black-, grey- or yellow-coloured emblems depicted below are tolerated and worn up to highest rank groups and grades. In service, some black-colour emblems, e.g. for the feldwebel grades, lieutenant, or major, might not be very visible.

Rank insignias tolerated versions - field uniform:

black emblem on 5-colour-flecktarn – Luftwaffe (Stabshauptmann)

black emblem on 5-colour-flecktarn – Heer (Lieutenant Armour corps)

bright-grey emblem on 5-color-flecktarn – Heer (Colonel Supply corps)

bright-grey emblem on 5-colour-flecktarn – Luftwaffe (Hauptfeldwebel)

black emblem on 3-color-flecktarn – Luftwaffe (Lieutenant colonel)

black emblem on 3-colour-flecktarn – Heer (Oberstabsfeldwebel Army aviation corps)

gold-yellow emblem on 5-colour-flecktarn – Marine (Hauptgefreiter)

gold-yellow emblem on 3-colour-flecktarn – Marine (Kapitänleutnant)

== Additional elements ==
As illustrated above, all rank insignias come with a number of diverse additional elements. In most cases they characterize a rank or career group within the Bundeswehr. Additional elements are not components of the rank insignia, because the rank or grade level is clearly defined by the rank insignia itself. However, there are additional statuses not defined by these rank markings, such as being a licensed medical officer or a designated officer of NCO rank. These require additional elements to signify such status.

=== Double wing ===
The double wing (also: aviator wing) is part of the mounting loop of any Luftwaffe uniform. It is woven in the colour of all other emblems (in most cases: black (image b.) – or gold by general ranks (image c.)). The double wing, also part of other elements on aviator's uniform, unambiguously distinguishes stone-grey/olive Luftwaffe uniforms from those of the Army. Double wing mounting loops are longer and wider than any other in the Bundeswehr. The double wing is even part of the otherwise empty mounting loop of the lowest private OR1-rank (German: Flieger (flyer) or Kanonier (gunner); see image a.), in order to distinguish between the Luftwaffe and Army in flecktarn Battle Dress Uniform.

Double wing to rank insignias Luftwaffe - field uniform:

a. Flieger OR1 (flecktarn uniform – Luftwaffe)

b.Major (flecktarn uniform – Luftwaffe)

c. Major general (flecktarn uniform – Luftwaffe)

=== Corps colour ===
Corps (or troop-function) colours (Waffenfarben in German) have been traditionally used in German armed forces since the 19th century. Corps-coloured piping and padding (4-mm-wide plain braiding) are used on the uniforms of Army and Luftwaffe personnel, placed on shoulder straps and cuffs to characterize the membership of an armed service, a special force, or a particular assignment. Corps-coloured loops might be used on mounting straps of field uniform. The collar patches on uniform jackets show corps colours as well. It should be mentioned that the piping and padding (German.: Litze) on the shoulder (bottom part of the badge) is issued after boot camp and the beret is issued to the Corps that the wearer is currently serving in. Hence, the Litze can have a different colour to the beret since a soldier may have passed boot camp in another Corps than that which they currently serve in.

Corps colours

| Collar patches of Army/Luftwaffe general ranks OF6 – OF7: | Deep-red |
| Army Officers in general staff assignment (i.G.): | Carmine |
| Personnel in Luftwaffe service uniform: | Gold-yellow |
| Artillerietruppe (Artillery): | Deep-red |
| ABC-Abwehrtruppe (CBRN defence): | Maroon ("Bordeaux") |
| Panzertruppe (Armored, MBT only): | Pink |
| Heeresaufklärungstruppe (Army reconnaissance, HUMINT): | Gold-yellow |
| Feldjägertruppe (Military Police): | Pure-orange |
| Führungsunterstützung (Electronic Warfare, IT, Communication, Psychological): | Yellow |
| Infanterie (Light Inf., Mechanized, Paratroopers, SOF): | Forest-green |
| Heereslogistik- und Instandsetzungstruppe (Logistics, Supply, Maintenance): | Medium-blue |
| Sanitätsdienst der Bundeswehr (Medical Personnel): | Gentian-Violet |
| Heeresfliegertruppe (Army Aviation): | Ash-grey |
| Pioniertruppe (Pioneers/Sappers): | Black |
| Militärmusikdienst (Military bands): | White |

=== Assignment badges ===
Assignment badges (German: Laufbahnabzeichen) of the German Navy are equivalent to the corps colours of the Army and Luftwaffe and have corresponding functions respectively.

Uniformed Naval personnel of enlisted and NCO rank wear specific marks of distinction or badges on epaulettes (not on mounting straps) and sleeves to characterize the appropriate assignment. The exception to this is officer-designated (OF(D)) grades.

As well as rank insignias on epaulettes, assignment badges are made up of metallic gold-coloured embossed pins or badges. Both are identical in colour and design. However, the assignment badges on sleeves are embroidered by hand or machine. Only the steel-blue assignment badges on white shirts of enlisted personnel are weaved. Seamen (recruit OR-1) wear assignment badges on shoulder straps or upper-sleeves that are otherwise empty. Assignment badges are normally positioned as follows:

- Enlisted personnel: in the middle below of the rank insignia
- NCOs with portepeed (sword knot): in the middle above of the rank insignia
- Maat and Obermaat: in the middle of the square between the sets of stripes

Assignment badges on epaulettes are normally symmetric and placed between the head and rank insignia. The exception is for members of the Naval health service (assignment series 81), where the asymmetrical Rod of Asclepius is placed at the head.

Various Assignment Series (AS) of German Marine assignment badges:

Nautical Service (10th)

Navy Command Service (20th)

Navy Weapon Service (30th)

Nautical Technical Service (40th)

Navy Aviation Service (50th)

Supply and Staff Service (60th)

Transport and Navy Security Service (70th)

AS 81: "Health Service Support"(design to left cuff)

AS 85: "Military Music Service"

=== Officers and designated officers ===
==== Army and Luftwaffe ====
In the Army and Luftwaffe, the epaulettes of general ranks OF6 to OF9 on service uniform (basic design) and dress uniform are ornamented with a gold border made from metallic fabric (piping), as shown above. Field officer ranks (OF1 to OF5), including the officer designated grade Oberfähnrich (Army: Senior Cadet Sergeant, Luftwaffe: Senior Aviation Cadet, Senior Warrant Officer (Br. Senior Acting Pilot Officer), Navy: Senior Midshipman), have silver-ornamented borders, also made from metallic fabric.

The metallic fabric ornamental border of the general ranks is made of fire-gilded silver wire. As for the field officer ranks, the ornamental border contains aluminium. A similar piping is employed on other uniform parts as well, e.g. on collar points of the service uniform jacket for officer ranks including Oberfähnrich (Army and Luftwaffe), or on the peaked cap (Schirmmütze in German) or mountain cape (German: Bergmütze).

Most officer designated ranks (Army and Luftwaffe) already have this particular silver metallic tissue border on epaulettes, next to the lower end of the mounting loop. The only exception to this is the Oberfähnrich shoulder strap, to be worn on service and dress uniform. This particular epaulette has the silver piping on its outline, indicating the officer's career, but lacks the bronze-coloured edging that usually borders the centre part of NCO-rank insignia, as opposed to the service uniform epaulettes of a Hauptfeldwebel (Staff Sergeant/First Sergeant, OR-7). However, rank badges on the mounting loops of Hauptfeldwebel and Oberfähnrich are identical.

Designated officers of OR-1 rank wear simple silver mounting loops on the otherwise empty epaulettes. A silver cord on the lower end of the mounting loop is usually worn in the Army. Alongside is another loop of corps colour, which indicates the membership to the appropriate branch of service, special force or assignment. The visible, silver-coloured stripes are essential in order to differentiate from equivalent NCO ranks, because an officer candidate with the rank of "Fähnrich" (Army: Cadet Sergeant, Luftwaffe: Aviation Cadet, Warrant Officer, Navy: Midshipman) may not yet have professional knowledge about his future troop type, whose colours he is already wearing, as opposed to a "Feldwebel" (Sergeant, OR-6). This is an issue solely related to specific service requirements, since formally, these ranks (e.g. Fahnenjunker and Unteroffizier) do not differ in their position in the command chain.

- OR5: Fahnenjunker versus Unteroffizier
- OR6: Fähnrich versus Feldwebel
- OR7: Oberfähnrich versus Hauptfeldwebel
Rank insignias (epaulette / mounting loop) for officer aspirant (OA) ranks

Schütze OA
(Army Gunner OA, service uniform epaulette, military musician service)

Fahnenjunker OA
(Army Officer Cadet OA, service uniform epaulette, military police corps)

Oberfähnrich OA
(Senior Warrant Officer OA Luftwaffe, epaulette of basic design for officers in service uniform)

Jäger OA
(Army Jäger OA, mounting loop, field uniform)

HA OS5 32 Oberfeldwebel OA
(Army First/Staff Sergeant OA, Panzer Grenadier Corps, field uniform)

Mounting loop Gefreiter OA
(Army Private OA, Mechanized Infantry Corps, field uniform)

Mounting loop Oberfähnrich OA
(Luftwaffe Senior Warrant Officer OA, basic form of mounting loop identical to Hauptfeldwebel, field uniform)

==== Navy ====
Regarding the Navy, apart from the rank insignia there are no additional elements given to all officer grades and officer designated ranks. Various assignment badges indicate the different officer chains of career and distinguish designated officers from other rank groups, e.g. enlisted ratings and NCOs. U-boat captains wear the traditional white hat. Examples of assignment badges dedicated to officer ranks are:

- Military geographical service – a stylized globe with GEO written in the middle.
- Military musician service – a three-sided lyre.
- Line officers (German: Truppendienstoffizier(e)) and warrant officers (German: Fachdienstoffizier(e)) – a five pointed nautical star (with the a single point at the top).

Assignment badges on shoulder straps are worn principally above the parallel gold-coloured galloons. They are designed as gold-coloured metallic stamped stickers in the style of the rank insignias of NCOs and enlisted men. The exception is weaved mounting loops, because not any assignment badge or career badge has to be worn on it.

Cuff assignment badges for officers are hand-embroidered and made from gold-coloured metallic fabric. In accordance with ZDv 37/10 on dark-blue epaulettes, hand-embroidered naval stars, made from gold-coloured metallic fabric, are tolerated as well.

Examples of assignment badges on epaulettes/cuff

Kapitänleutnant
(line officer or warrant officer career)

Stabskapitänleutnant
(military geographical service)

Kapitän zur See
(line officer career)

Leutnant zur See
(military geographical service)

Leutnant zur See
(military musician service)

As mentioned above, the nautical star identifies all officer dedicated ranks as well, with the exception of the medical career chain (see below).

Versions for officer aspirant (OA) ranks, medical career excepted

Gefreiter OA
(Able Seaman OA epaulettes)

Fähnrich zur See
(Midshipman OA epaulettes)

Oberfähnrich zur See OA
(Senior Mdishipman OA epaulette, designed identically to officer ranks)

Matrose OA
(Seaman Recruit OA sleeve)

Gefreiter OA
(Seaman OA sleeve)

Seekadett OA
(Sea Cadet OA sleeve)

Oberfähnrich zur See OA
(Senior Midshipman OA cuff, designed identically to officer ranks)

Matrose OA
(Seaman Recruit OA mounting strap, with embroidered nautical star)

Hauptgefreiter OA
(Able Seaman OA mounting strap, with embroidered nautical star)

Oberfähnrich zur See
(Senior Midshipman OA mounting strap, with embroidered nautical star)

==== Officers of the Medical Service including Officer Aspirants ====
The speciality badge is different for medicine, dentistry, veterinary medicine and pharmacy. As mentioned above, it depicts the Rod of Asclepius. The head of the snake points forward, i.e. the direction the soldier is facing. Officer Aspirants are known as Sanitätsoffizieranwärter or SanOA for short, which translates as Medical Officer Aspirant (MOA). This denotes personnel who are yet to finish their medical studies. Excluding Officer Aspirants and Generals, medical ranks have slightly different names to denote specialities, e.g. a physician holding a rank equivalent to Hauptmann (Captain) is called Stabsarzt (Staff Doctor), a dentist Stabsarzt (Staff Dentist), a veterinarian Stabsveterinär (Staff Vet), and a pharmacist Stabsapotheker (Staff Pharmacist).

Versions for officers of the medical service including officer candidates

Sanitätssoldat SanOA
(Army MOA mounting loop, field uniform, studying veterinary medicine)

Gefreiter SanOA
(Luftwaffe MOA epaulette, service uniform, studying medicine)

Oberfeldwebel SanOA
(Army MOA, field uniform mounting loop, studying veterinary medicine, patch interrupting border)

Fähnrich zur See SanOA
(Navy MOA, field uniform mounting loop, studying pharmacy, patch not interrupting border)

Leutnant zur See SanOA
(Navy MOA, service uniform shirt epaulette, studying medicine)

Stabsarzt
(Army Staff Doctor, service uniform epaulette)

Oberstabsapotheker
(Luftwaffe Senior Pharmacist, field uniform epaulette)

Flottenarzt
(Naval Doctor cuff insignias)

Oberfeldarzt
(Army Senior Field Doctor, sweater mounting loop)

Oberstveterinär
(Army Senior Vet, service uniform epaulette)

Generalarzt
(Army General Dentist, service uniform epaulette)

Generalstabsarzt
(Luftwaffe Staff General Doctor, field uniform mounting loop)

Generaloberstabsarzt
(Army Senior Staff General Dentist, field uniform mounting loop)

=== Feldwebel/Bootsmann Aspirants ===
Feldwebel (Sergeant) Aspirant epaulettes include a bronze cord at the bottom of the strap as career indicator (Barely visible on some pictures; Click on Image to enlarge).

Versions of Feldwebel Aspirant (FA)/Bootsman Aspirant (BA) ranks

Panzergrenadier FA
(Army sergeant aspirant, Panzer Grenadier Corps, field uniform)

Hauptgefreier FA
(Army lance corporal/Private first class sergeant aspirant, field uniform mounting strap)

Unteroffizier FA
(Army NCO sergeant aspirant, field uniform mounting strap)

Oberstabsgefreiter FA
(Army corporal sergeant aspirant, Mountain Infantry, field uniform mounting strap)

Gefreiter FA
(Luftwaffe airman sergeant aspirant, service uniform epaulette)

Unteroffizier FA
(Luftwaffe corporal sergeant aspirant, field uniform mounting strap)

Gefreiter BA
(Navy seaman boatswain aspirant, 30th assignment series, service uniform epaulette)

Gefreiter BA
(Navy seaman boatswain aspirant, 10th assignment series)

Stabsgefreiter BA
(Navy able seaman boatswain aspirant, field uniform mounting strap. note the small stripes)

Obermaat BA
(Navy senior mate boatswain aspirant, field uniform mounting strap)

=== Unteroffizier/ Maat cadets ===
Versions to Unteroffizier Aspirant (UA) ranks/ Maat Aspirant (MA) Marine

Flieger UA
(Heer, Army aviation, service uniform)

Hauptgefreiter UA
(Heer, mountain infantry, field uniform)

Obergefreiter UA
(Luftwaffe, service uniform)

Hauptgefreiter UA
(Luftwaffe, service uniform)

Flieger UA
(Luftwaffe, field uniform)

Gefreiter MA
(Marine, 50th assignment series)

Gefreiter MA
(Marine, 85th assignment series)

Oberstabsgefreiter MA
(Marine, mounting loop)

==== Aspirants, examination/course of instruction passed ====
Versions to Unteroffizier Aspirant (UA) ranks, examination/ course of instruction passed

Obergefreiter UA exam.passed
(Luftwaffe, service uniform)

Stabsgefreiter UA exam.passed
(Heer, Panzergrenadie, field uniform)

Obergefreiter UA exam.passed
(Luftwaffe, field uniform)

=== Reservist Insignia (obsolete) ===
Reserve and retired servicemembers wore the shoulder insignia described below until August 2019, when the use of such was discontinued. Currently, reservists and retired personnel wear the same rank insignia as their active duty peers. The Army/Air Force wore a black-red-gold cord affixed to the shoulder loop, and naval personnel wore a letter "R" affixed as shown below.

Reserve/Retired Insignia for Heer/ Luftwaffe

Obergefreiter der Reserve
(Army lance corporal/private first class reservist, service uniform, engineer corps)

Stabsunteroffizier der Reserve
(Army staff sub-officer reservist, service uniform, military police)

Oberfeldwebel Reserveoffizieranwärter (ROA)
(Army staff sergeant, field uniform, mechanized infantry corps, reserve officer aspirant)

Brigadegeneral ausser Dienst
(Luftwaffe retired brigadier general, service uniform)

Stabsunteroffizier der Reserve
(Luftwaffe staff sub-officer reservist, field uniform)

Navy

Examples of Navy Reserve/Retired Insignia

Obergefreiter der Reserve
(Able seaman reservist)

Kapitänleutnant der Reserve
(Captain-lieutenant reservist)

== See also ==
- Military ranks of the German Empire
- Military ranks of the Weimar Republic
- Comparative ranks of Nazi Germany
- Military ranks of East Germany
