= Hauptfeldwebel (rank) =

Rank in the German Army and Air Force

- Heer and Luftwaffe shoulder insignia
- Country: Germany
- Service branch: German Army; German Air Force
- Abbreviation: HptFw
- Rank: Unteroffiziere mit Portepee grade
- NATO rank code: OR-7 / OR-8
- Non-NATO rank: E-7
- Formation: 1957
- Next higher rank: Stabsfeldwebel
- Next lower rank: Oberfeldwebel
- Equivalent ranks: Hauptbootsmann

Hauptfeldwebel (HptFw or HF; lit. 'Head Field Bailiff') is the third highest Non-commissioned officer (NCO) grade in German Army and German Air Force. It is grouped as OR-7 / OR-8 in NATO, equivalent to US Army Sergeant 1st Class and Master Sergeant. In army/air force context, NCOs of this rank were formally addressed as Herr Hauptfeldwebel also informally/short Hauptfeld.

== History ==
The Hauptfeldwebel introduced by the German Wehrmacht in 1938, was not as a military rank, but an assignment to "company sergeant" (German: Kompaniefeldwebel or Spiess). Most experienced Portepée-NCO with the rank Stabsfeldwebel (more rarely Oberfeldwebel) have been assigned to that distinguished position. The equivalent assignment in the Waffen-SS was the SS-Stabsscharführer.

The assignment was also used in the GDR National People's Army from 1956 until 1990.

In 1957, the rank was introduced in the West German Armed Forces.

== Rank sequence ==
The sequence of ranks (top-down approach) in that particular group (Senior NCOs with portepee) is as follows:

- OR-9: Oberstabsfeldwebel / Oberstabsbootsmann
- OR-8: Stabsfeldwebel / Stabsbootsmann
- OR-7: Hauptfeldwebel / Hauptbootsmann
- OR-6: Oberfeldwebel / Oberbootsmann
- OR-6: Feldwebel / Bootsmann

== Sources ==
- BROCKHAUS, Die Enzyklopädie in 24 Bänden (1796–2001), Band 5: 3-7653-3665-3, S. 487, Definition: Hauptfeldwebel/Oberfähnrich
- BROCKHAUS, Die Enzyklopädie in 24 Bänden (1796–2001), Band 7: 3-7653-3676-9, S. 185, Hauptfeldwebel
