= Unteroffiziere mit Portepee =

Grouping of senior German NCO ranks

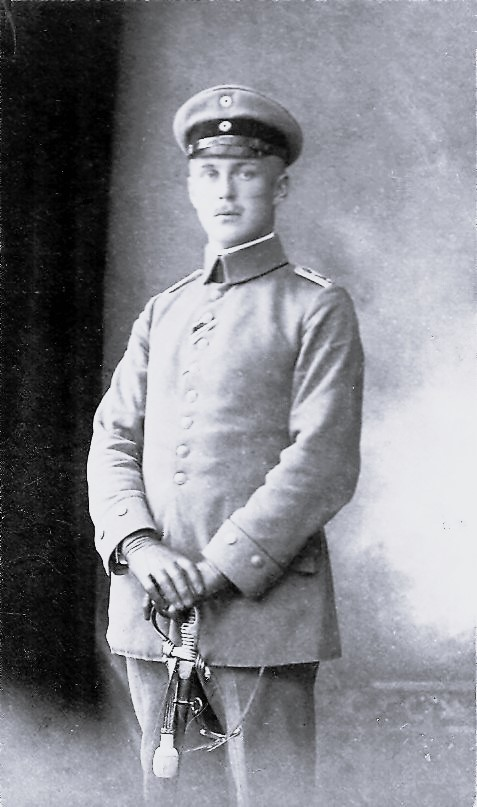
Fähnrich with Portepee

Unteroffizier(e) mit Portepee, also Portepeeunteroffizier(e) (transl. Non-commissioned officer(s) with sword knot), is the designation for German senior non-commissioned officers in the armed forces of Germany. The title derives from the French porte-épée ("sword bearer"), as senior enlisted men would historically carry a sword into battle.

== History ==
Coloured sidearm tassels were introduced in the Prussian army in 1808. They were used as a decorative equipment and to differentiate companies within a regiment. Ranks below Fähnrich were issued either the Troddel or Faustriemen depending on their unit. The Troddel was used by infantry, artillery, pioneer, signal, anti-tank and supply troops, while the Faustriemen was worn by cavalry and rifle troops. Some units would wear honorary tassels of Russian red leather, to indicate their relation to the 1st Regiment of (Prussian) Grenadier Guards. Unteroffiziere mit Portepee would wear tassels independently of their company relations.

The top-down sequence of ranks in that group is:

- OR-9: Oberstabsfeldwebel / Oberstabsbootsmann this rank was introduced by the Bundeswehr in 1983
- OR-8: Stabsfeldwebel / Stabsbootsmann (in the Kriegsmarine Stabsoberbootsmann, Stabsobersteuermann, and Stabsobermaschinist)
- OR-7: Hauptfeldwebel (Oberfähnrich)/ Hauptbootsmann (Oberfähnrich zur See), this rank was introduced by the Bundeswehr after an assignment/position of service (informally Spieß and officially now Kompaniefeldwebel in the Reichswehr, Wehrmacht, and National People's Army)
- OR-6: Oberfeldwebel / Oberbootsmann
- OR-6: Feldwebel / Bootsmann

Naval equivalents—replacing Feldwebel with Bootsmann—and, historically, the Cavalry and Artillery (replacing with Wachtmeister). The latter is not to be confused with the Navy's "Kompaniefeldwebel" of today which are also called Wachtmeister.

German NCOs were identified by the use of metallic lace (called Tresse) on the collar of the uniform jacket, as well as the edges of the shoulder straps. Senior non-commissioned officers in the Wehrmacht also used silver "stars" on the shoulder strap to differentiate between ranks; one star for a Feldwebel, two for an Oberfeldwebel, and three for a Stabsfeldwebel.

== Table of Portepee-ranks ==
Rank insignia to Portepee-NCOs of Heer, Luftwaffe and Marine
German payment level	A9Z	A9	A8Z	A7mZ	A7
Shoulder straps service uniform/ field uniform
rank	Oberstabsfeldwebel	Stabsfeldwebel	Hauptfeldwebel (Oberfähnrich)	Oberfeldwebel	Feldwebel (Fähnrich)
Shoulder straps cuff insignias field uniform
rank	Oberstabsbootsmann	Stabsbootsmann	Hauptbootsmann (Oberfähnrich zur See)	Oberbootsmann	Bootsmann (Fähnrich zur See)
NATO rank scale code	OR-9	OR-8	OR-7	OR-6

== See also ==
- Unteroffiziere ohne Portepee - NCOs without portepee
- Rank insignia of the German Bundeswehr
