= Stabswachtmeister =

Austrian military rank

Stabswachtmeister (short: StWm) is in the Austrian Bundesheer a NCO-rank. As lowest grade of the Staff-NCO rank group he is normally dedicated to command a platoon or to serve in a military staff appointment (assignment group M BUO 1 / professional NCO; respectively M ZUO 1 / longer-serving volunteer). However, he might also be assigned to command a military squad (assignment group M BUO 2 / longer-serving volunteer).

Besides Austria today, the rank was also used for example in Germany and in the k.u.k. Army.

With the foundation of the Austrian Bundesheer in March 1920 the «Stabswachtmeister» was introduced to all army branches of service. The rank Stabsfeldwebel of the generic infantry (de: Fußtruppen) was abolished.

== Austria ==
Stabswachtmeister
- Peaked cap

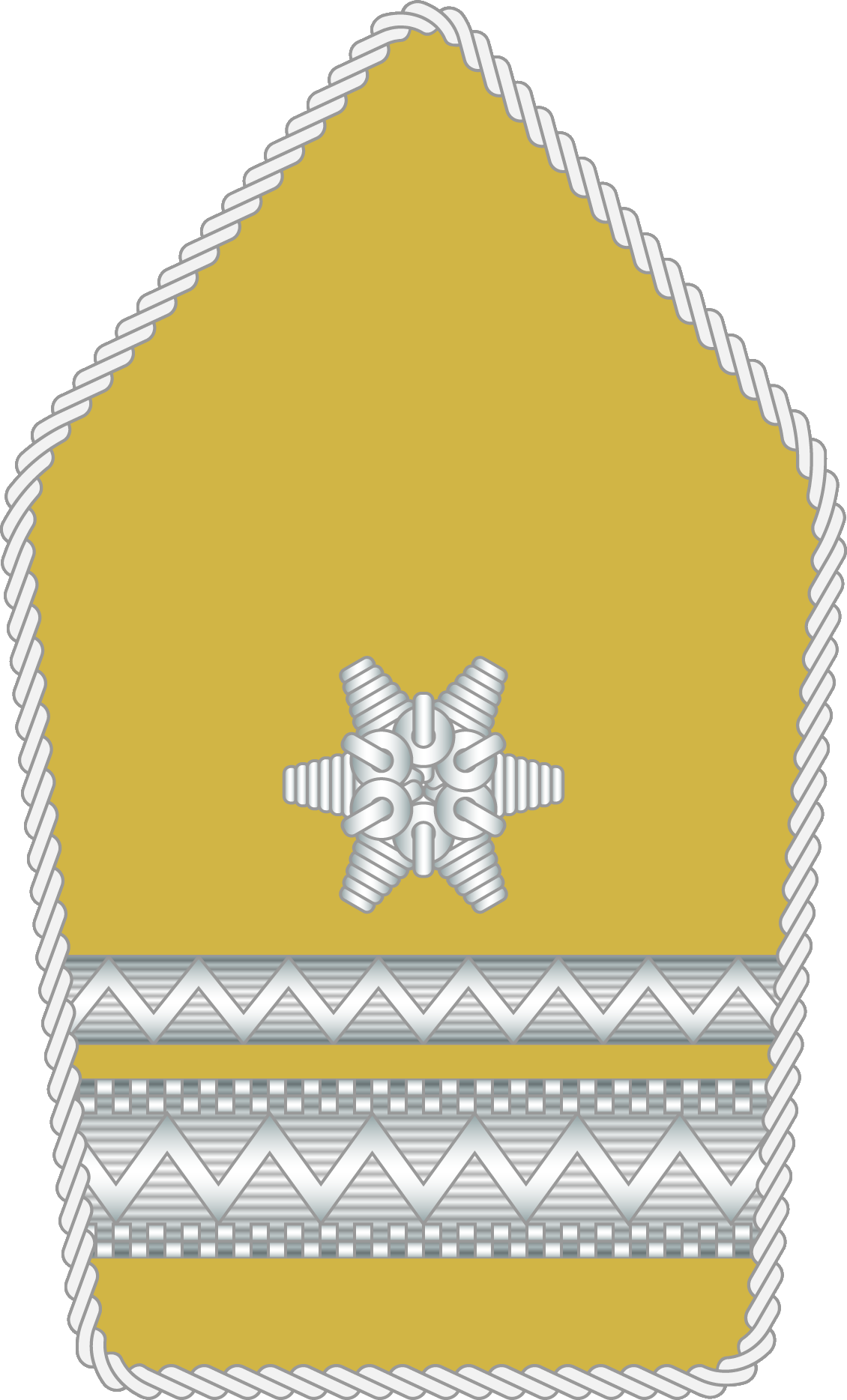
- Field uniform | service uniform
- Country: Austria
- Service branch: Austrian Armed Forces
- Abbreviation: OWm
- Rank group: Junior NCO (Unteroffiziere)
- Non-NATO rank: OR-7
- Formation: 1913
- Next higher rank: Oberstabswachtmeister
- Next lower rank: Oberwachtmeister

The Stabswachtmeister rank was introduced in 1913 to the cavalry of the k.u.k. Army. As well as the Offiziersstellvertreter (en: officer deputy rank), this rank has been counted to the higher NCO-ranks (also: Unteroffiziere with port épée / port épée NCOs) since 1915. According to the Austria-Hungarian rank table it was equivalent to the rank class XII.

In the k.u.k. Austro-Hungarian Army Stabswachtmeister was equivalent to:

- Stabsfeldwebel (en: 1st sergeant) of the infantry,
- Stabsoberjäger (en: Rifles 1st sergeant) of the mountain troops,
- Stabsfeuerwerker (en: Artillery 1st sergeant) of the artillery,

Sequence of ranks
Junior rank Wachtmeister	(Austro-Hungarian armed forces rank); Stabswachtmeister	Senior rank Kadett-Offiziersstellvertreter; Kadett

Then rank insignia was a gorget patch on the stand-up collar of the so-called Waffenrock (en: uniform jacket), and consisted of three white stars on 13 mm ragged imperial-yellow silk galloon, with 2mm broad black middle strap, 3mm above a 6mm braiding (since June 1914: silver galloon with silk stars). The gorget patch and the stand-up collar showed the particular Waffenfarbe (en: corps colour).

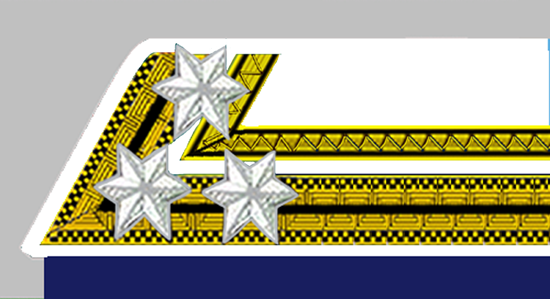
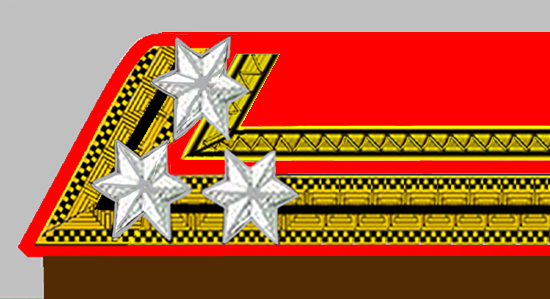
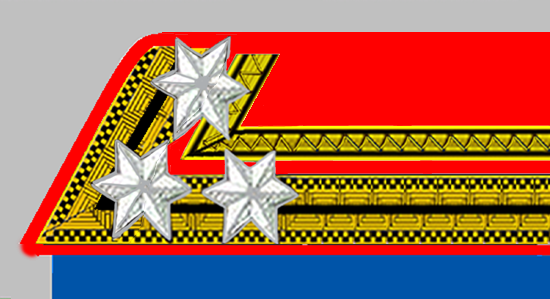
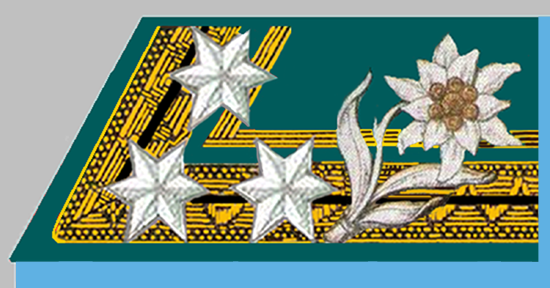
Designation	Performance 1913-1914
Paroli
Rank description	Stabsfeldwebel	Stabsfeuerwerker; Artillery	Stabswachtmeister; Dragoon	Stabsoberjaeger; Mountain infantry
(Hungarian)	(Törzsőrmester)

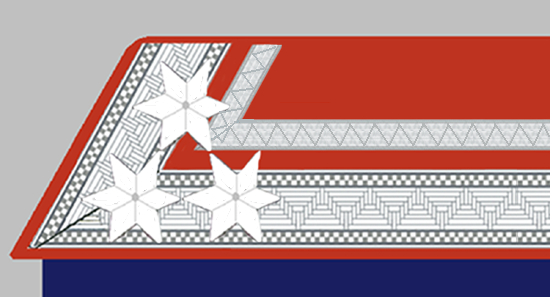
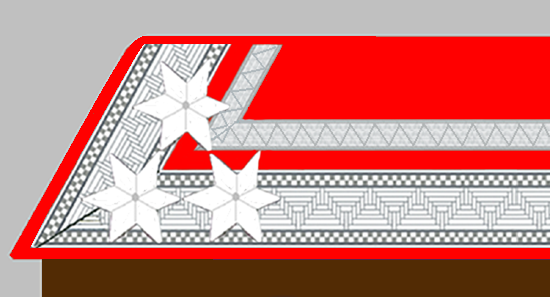
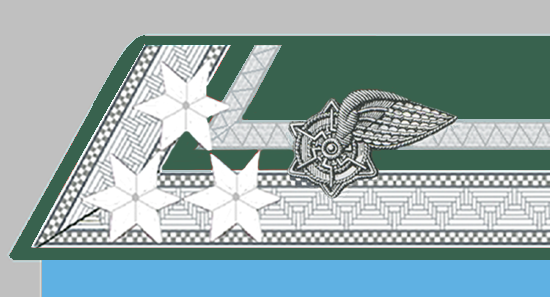
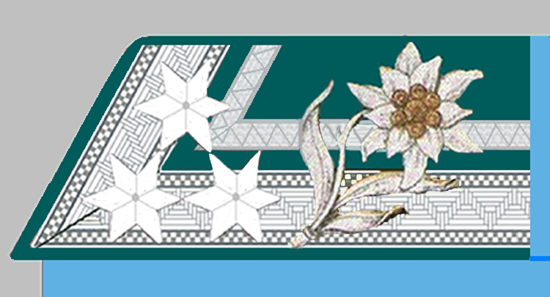
Designation	Performance 1914-1918
Rank insignia collar
Rank description	Stabsfeldwebel; Stabswachtmeister	Stabsfeuerwerker; Artillery	Stabsfeldwebel; Railway regiment	Stabsoberjaeger; Mountain infantry
(Hungarian)	(Törzsőrmester)

Stabswachtmeister in k.u.k adjustation

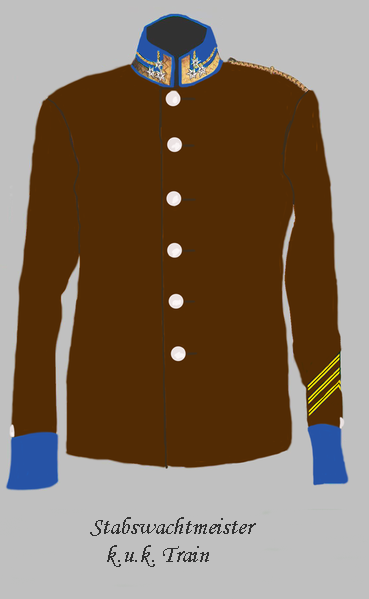
Stabswachtmeister train troops 1913-1914 (more than 9 years in service)

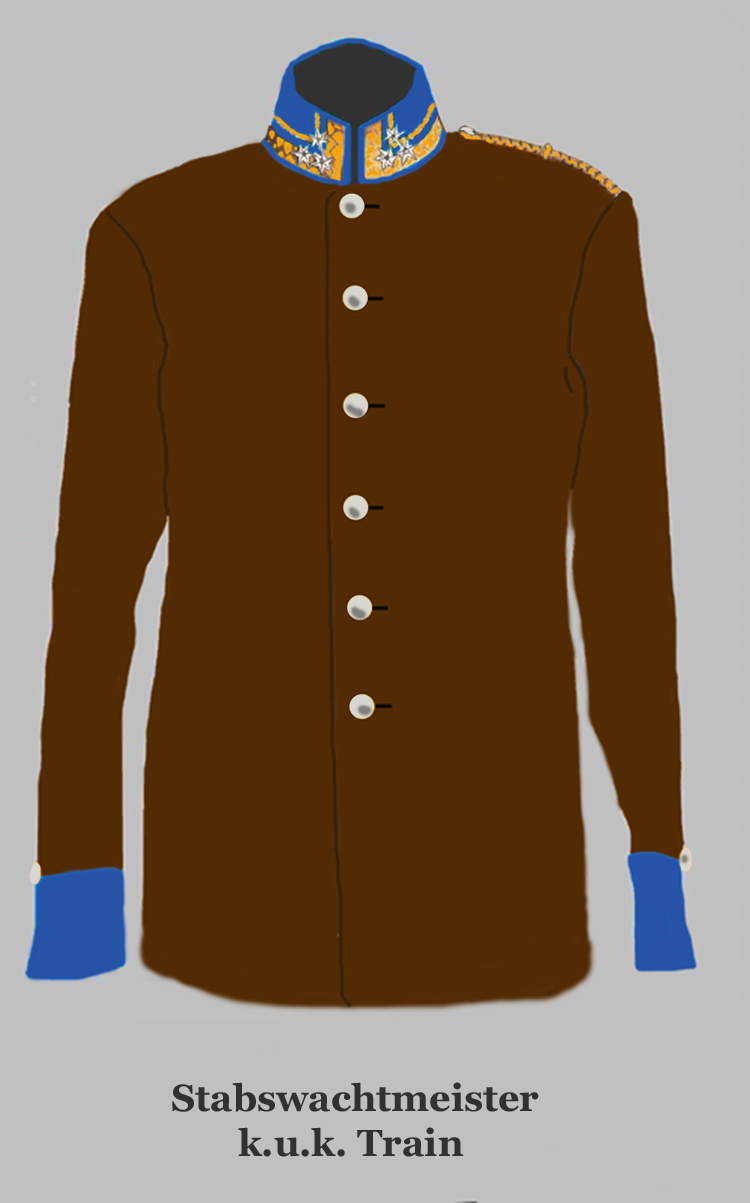
Stabswachtmeister train troops until 1914

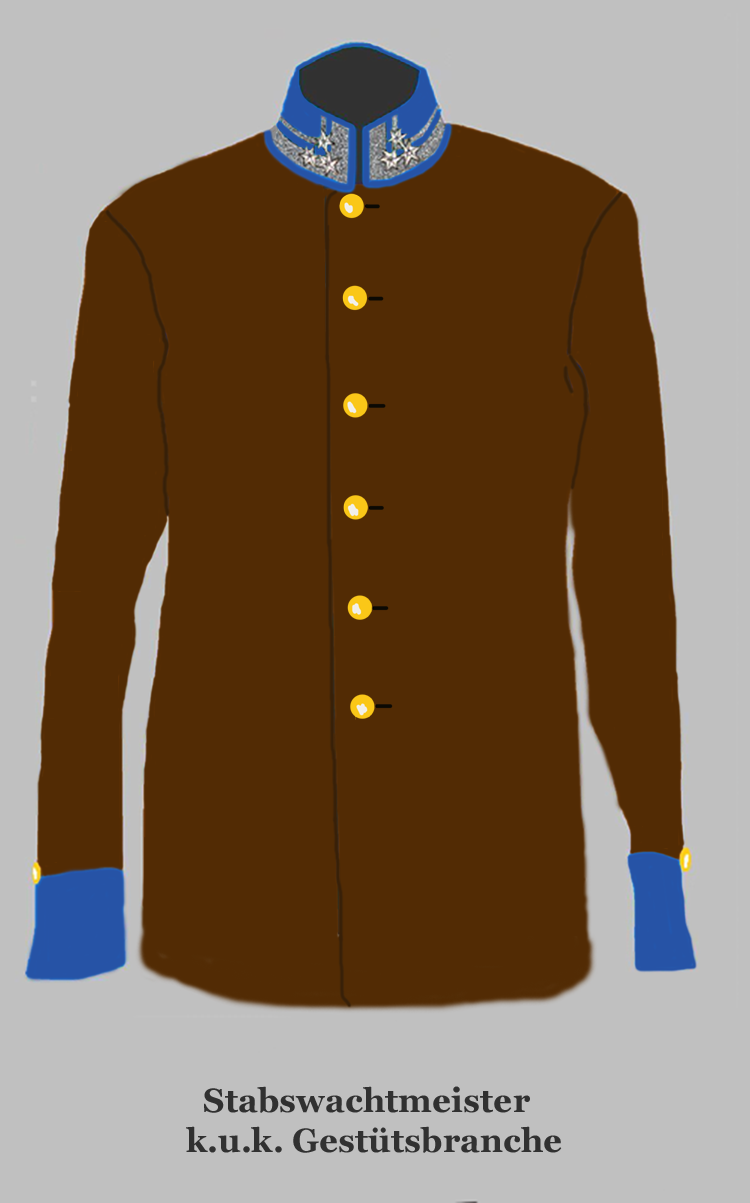
Stabswachtmeister stude since 1914

see also

== Germany ==
In the today's German Bundeswehr there is no rank designation «Stabswachtmeister».

In the German Reichswehr as well as Wehrmacht the designation of the Stabsfeldwebel rank of Cavalry and Artillery was «Stabswachtmeister» until 1945.

«Stabswachtmeister» was also a German police rank.

Sequence of ranks
Junior Rank; Wachtmeister (Feldwebel)	World War II German Army rank Stabswachtmeister (Stabsfeldwebel)	Senior Rank; Leutnant (en: 2nd Lieutenant)

See also

- World War II German Army ranks and insignia

=== Nationale People’s Army ===
In the GDR National People's Army (NPA) the rank «Stabswachtmeister» was replaced by the universal rank designation Stabsfeldwebel. The equivalent rank of the Volksmarine (en: GDR Navy) was the Stabsobermeister of the Volksmarine.

Sequence of ranks until 1970
Junior Rank; Wachtmeister (Feldwebel)	National People's Army rank Stabswachtmeister (Stabsfeldwebel)	Senior Rank; Unterleutnant (en: Under lieutenant)

See also

- Ranks of the National People's Army
