= Officer candidate =

Military rank

Officer candidate or officer aspirant (OA) is a rank in some militaries of the world that is an appointed position while a person is in training to become an officer. More often than not, an officer candidate was a civilian who applied to join the military directly as an officer. Officer candidates are, therefore, not considered of the same status as enlisted personnel.

== Finland ==
In the Finnish Defence Forces, officer candidate is a service rank, equivalent but senior to sergeant, that is given to conscripts who completed the Reserve Officer School (RUK). At the end of their conscript service, officer candidates are promoted to the rank of second lieutenant.

== Germany ==
In the German Armed Forces, officer designates are enlisted personnel. Soldiers accepted for officer training are given the annotation (OA) for Offizieranwärter ("Officer Aspirant") to their rank. Then the designate progresses through the ranks of Fahnenjunker (OR-5), Fähnrich (OR-6) and Oberfähnrich (OR-7) in the German Army and German Air Force. Officer designates in the German Navy go through the corresponding ranks of Seekadett, Fähnrich zur See and Oberfähnrich zur See instead.

Officer designates in the army and air force wear the same uniform and insignia as the corresponding NCOs; added a silver metal tissue cord on their shoulder straps. A distinction to this is the insignia of the Oberfähnrich. His service and dress uniforms, including the shoulder straps, are sowed the silver piping, indicating the officer career instead of the NCO piping. However, his rank insignia on mounting loops for the field uniform are identical to the non-commissioned Hauptfeldwebel; plus the cord of the officer designate.

The navy doesn't use a silver cord to indicate the officer designates; instead a golden nautical star is displayed. The rank insignia of Seekadett and Fähnrich zur See is the same as for the corresponding NCOs, but exchanges the anchor symbol with the nautical star. The rank insignia for Oberfähnrich zur See is lent to the Leutnant zur See, displaying the nautical star and a golden half-stripe — also on the field uniform.

from 1956	German Army						German Navy		
Germany									
Distinction	Fahnenjunker	Fähnrich	Oberfähnrich	Fahnenjunker	Fähnrich	Oberfähnrich	Seekadett	Fähnrich zur See	Oberfähnrich zur See
Rank code	(OR-5)	(OR-6)	(OR-7)	(OR-5)	(OR-6)	(OR-7)	(OR-5)	(OR-6)	(OR-7)

== Indonesia ==
In the Indonesian National Armed Forces, an officer candidate (calon perwira) is one who wants to earn a commission as an officer in the armed forces.

Officers in the Indonesian National Armed Forces are commissioned through one of four major commissioning programs. Upon graduation the candidates are promoted to the rank of second lieutenant, thus becoming commissioned officers. The four programs are:

- National Armed Forces Academy (Akademi TNI): a four-year undergraduate program that emphasizes instruction in the arts, sciences, and professions, preparing men and women to take on the challenge of being officers in the armed forces (Army: Military Academy, Navy: Naval Academy, Air Force: Air Force Academy);
- Officer Candidate School: a 28-week program that is attended by senior NCOs or warrant officers from all services;
- Career Officer Program for college graduates: a 7–8 month program that is designed to recruit civilian professionals (e.g., doctors, dentists, pharmacists, psychologists) into the armed forces;
- Pilot Short Service School: a 34-month program to train pilots to serve in the armed forces.

== Philippines ==
In the Philippines, an officer candidate ("OC") is a civilian who holds a baccalaureate degree and who wants to earn a commission as an officer in the Armed Forces of the Philippines. Upon admission to the Officer Candidate School, officer candidates are appointed as probationary second lieutenants and probationary ensigns.

=== Cadet vs Officer Candidate ===
The words cadet and officer candidate are synonymous in referring the rank below second lieutenant. In the Philippines, officer candidates are referred to RESCOM, AFPOCS and PCGOBETC students who had baccalaureate degree, foreign service academies and reserve officer pools undergoing 4 months to 1 year of rigorous military training. On the other hand, cadets are referred to students of military schools such as PMA, PNPA, PMMA, MAAP and ACP undergoing 4 years of military training while completing their college degree.

== United Kingdom ==
In the British Armed Forces, officer candidates (or potential officer candidates) are civilians or enlisted persons who apply to join the service as an officer. This does not infer rank or salutation. On joining the Armed Force, they then become designated as Officer Cadets.

== United States ==
=== Officer candidate ===
==== U.S. Army ====
In the United States Army, officer candidates attend either the Federal Officer Candidate School (OCS) at Fort Benning, Georgia, or Army National Guard Regional Training Institutes (RTIs). RTIs follow the same curriculum and requirements as OCS and commission graduates who receive federal recognition into the Army National Guard. Soldiers who attend OCS are usually prior service enlisted personnel, though civilians with college degrees can enlist and go directly to OCS after basic training. Additionally, Warrant Officer Candidates attend the Warrant Officer Candidate school and are also officer candidates.

With regard to rank, a U.S. Army officer candidate exists in a gray area. AR 600–20, Army Command Policy, places their rank as outranking all enlisted members of the service and rank directly below all officers. They are not yet officers. They are enlisted soldiers who lose all rank status when reporting to the course. Regardless of pay grade, traditionally, but technically incorrect, candidates are outranked by any course cadre or permanent party enlisted soldiers they may encounter. Although their status does not correspond to a position of authority within the standard U.S. Army ranks, candidates serve in leadership training roles at the platoon or company level. They are addressed as "candidate" by the OCS cadre. During the first few weeks of indoctrination, candidates are treated much the same as a new recruit. In the final weeks of training, OCS platoons may achieve "senior" status and senior officer candidates may be addressed as "Sir" or "Ma'am" by more junior candidates, but never by other enlisted ranks.

The pay grade for a U.S. Army officer candidate is E-5 (Federal OCS), or E-6 (State OCS) on the enlisted pay scale, unless the candidate previously achieved a higher enlisted rank. For example, an E-7 who becomes a candidate would continue to receive E-7 pay. The OCS uniform is stripped of the rank patch which is replaced by the letters "OCS." Upon commissioning, a candidate becomes a second lieutenant.

==== U.S. Marine Corps ====
In the United States Marine Corps, officer candidates are trained by Marine officers and staff non-commissioned officer Marines at the Officer Candidates School in Quantico, Virginia.

==== U.S. Navy ====
U.S. Navy officer candidate insignia.

In the United States Navy, officer candidates are trained at either the Officer Candidate School or Officer Development School in Newport, Rhode Island. A parallel program known as Aviation Officer Candidate School (AOCS) at NAS Pensacola, Florida, previously produced officers slated to become naval aviators, naval flight officers, air intelligence officers and aircraft maintenance duty officers not otherwise procured via the U.S. Naval Academy or NROTC. A major distinction between the two programs was the use of enlisted Marine Corps drill instructors in the AOCS program, a vestige from the World War II and early 1950s period when AOCS graduates were given the option of being commissioned in the U.S. Navy or U.S. Marine Corps before proceeding to flight training. AOCS was disestablished in 1994 due to BRAC action and merged into the current OCS program in 1994.

Officer candidate is also the rank to which participants in the active duty commissioning program "Seaman to Admiral 21" are appointed. STA 21 officer candidates are appointed to the rank at the Naval Science Institute and go on to hold the rank while training with the Naval Reserve Officer Training Corps at NROTC-affiliated universities. While attached to their colleges or universities, officer candidates are looked to as mentors to the midshipmen throughout the school year. They must maintain 2.0 GPAs, and are urged to assist midshipmen in developing their own leadership abilities.

STA 21 OCs maintain their enlisted pay grade and eligibility for enlisted advancement. The number of sailors selected each year to participate in the "Seaman to Admiral 21 program" varies from year to year. Fiscal year 2010 admitted about 200 candidates, FY11- 115, and FY12- about 75. Currently, the program has been downsized to only admit 50 candidates.

The rank of officer candidate is denoted by an officer's uniform with no insignia except for a line officer's star device on white and dress blue uniforms. If the candidate has never had prior service, rank is typically that of Officer Candidate Under Instruction Second Class (OCUI2). On khaki and working blue uniforms, fouled anchors are worn on the collar points until candidate officer status is achieved, at which time OCs wear the bar insignia similar to their senior/midshipmen 1st class counterparts at the U.S. Naval Academy and in NROTC.

==== U.S. Coast Guard ====
In the United States Coast Guard, Officer Candidates (OC) are trained at the Officer Candidate School (OCS) located at the U.S. Coast Guard Academy in New London, Connecticut.

=== Officer trainee ===
==== U.S. Air Force ====
In the United States Air Force, officer candidates are known as Officer Trainees (OT) and are trained at the Officer Training School (OTS) at Maxwell AFB, Alabama.

Similar to the Army officer candidates, Air Force officer trainees exist in a gray zone with regard to rank, and their status does not directly correspond to a position of seniority or authority within the standard Air Force ranks. Typically, they are referred to or addressed as "OT," and during the first few weeks of indoctrination, are treated much the same as a new recruit. The pay for an officer trainee, however, is equal to an E-5 on the enlisted pay scale, unless the candidate previously achieved a higher enlisted rank than E-5, e.g., an E-7 who becomes a candidate would continue to receive E-7 pay, and so on. Once commissioned, the new officer advances to the pay rate of O-1, unless they have at least four years of active duty service, in which case they are paid the higher O-1E rate in recognition of the prior enlisted service. Such pay continues at promotion to the next two grades ("O-2E" and "O-3E"), but is discontinued at the grade of O-4.

OT rank insignia loosely parallels that of Air Force ROTC and United States Air Force Academy Cadet Insignia, except in the case of the directly commissioned chaplains, lawyers, and medical personnel.

==== U.S. Coast Guard ====
In the United States Coast Guard, those who are assigned to the College Student Pre-Commissioning Initiative (CSPI) Scholarship Program hold the rank of Officer Trainee (OT). They are active-duty enlisted members who receive E-3 pay. Their position of seniority or authority is that of an E-3, although they are typically given greater autonomy, responsibilities, and are treated as future officers (I.e. attending unit leadership briefings, eating in the wardroom, and mirroring training activities of Ensigns (O-1). Upon arrival at OCS, they become Officer Candidates (OC).
