= Leutnant =

Rank in the armed forces of Germany, Austria, and Switzerland

Leutnant (German pronunciation: [ˈlɔʏtnant]) is the lowest junior officer rank in the armed forces of Germany (Bundeswehr), the Austrian Armed Forces, and the Swiss Armed Forces.

== History ==
The German noun (with the meaning "Stellvertreter" (in English "deputy") from Middle High German «locum tenens» Platzhalter (in English "place holder") was derived from the French word Lieutenant about 1500. In most German-speaking armies it is the lowest officer rank (in German-speaking navies Leutnant zur See (English "Lieutenant at sea")). In the German Bundeswehr the ranks Leutnant and Oberleutnant belong to the Leutnant rank group. In some other armed forces (such as the former National People's Army) there is the lower grade of Unterleutnant.

From about 1500 until the middle of the 17th century the designation of Leutnant was commonly used for any deputy to a commanding officer. So at the army level there was the appointment of General-Leutnant (English "lieutenant-general"), at the regimental level there was that of Oberst-Leutnant (English "lieutenant-colonel"), and at the company level the Leutnant was deputy to a Hauptmann (English "captain").

With the formation of standing armies in the second half of the 17th century, the term commonly came to designate the rank of the least senior commissioned officer.

In the 18th and 19th century, at the unit level several Leutnants served as platoon leaders. At that time the ranks of Premier-Lieutenant and Seconde-Lieutenant came into existence. With effect from January 1, 1899, in the German Empire these ranks were renamed as Oberleutnant and Leutnant.

== Austria ==
Lieutenant Leutnant
- Peaked cap

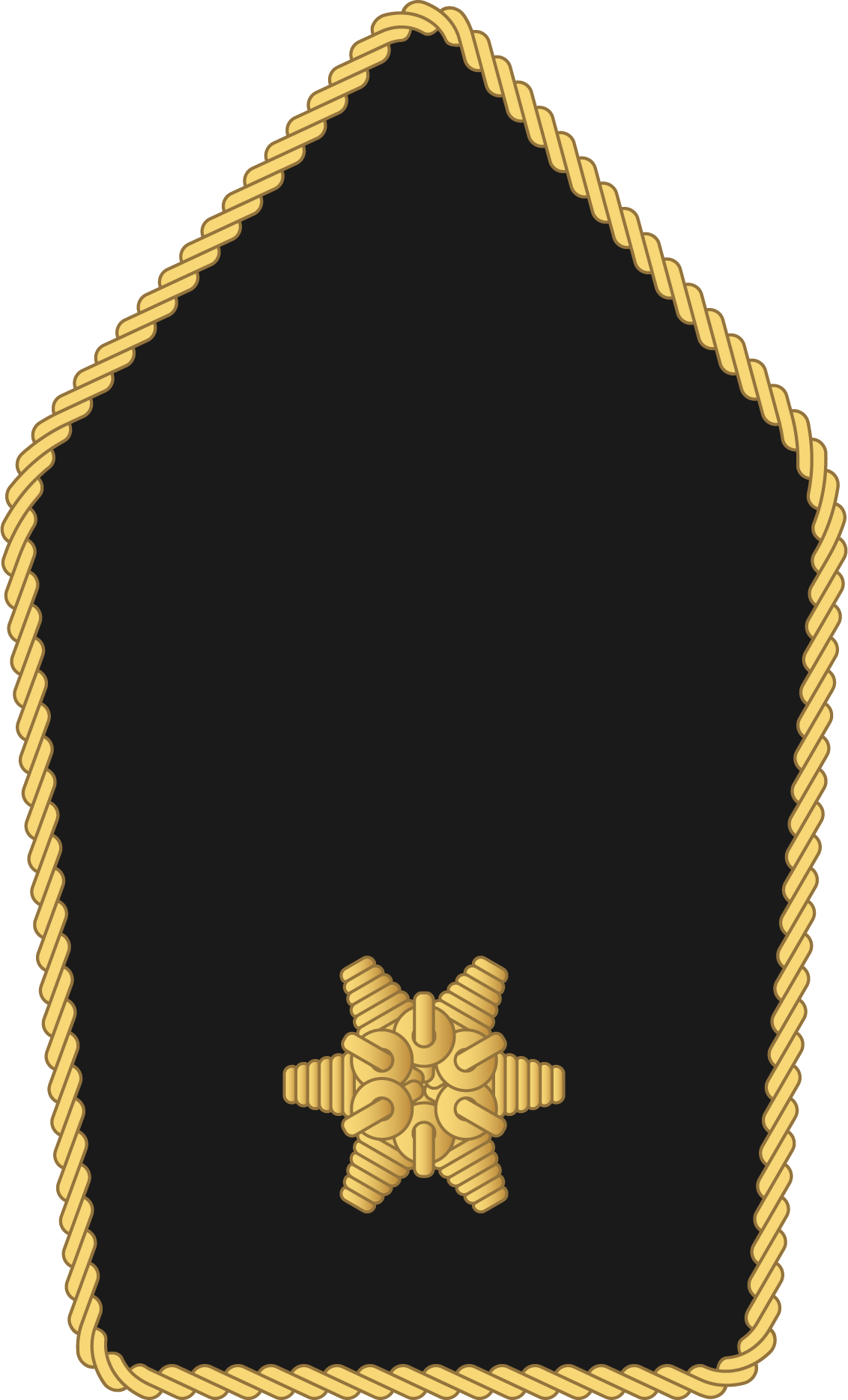
- Field uniform | service uniform
- Country: Austria
- Service branch: Austrian Armed Forces
- Abbreviation: Lt
- Rank group: Junior officer
- Non-NATO rank: OF-1
- Next higher rank: Oberleutnant
- Next lower rank: Fähnrich

In Austria the Leutnant (short: Lt) is a commissioned officer rank in the Austrian Armed Forces. Mandatory to be promoted to that rank is a six terms course of high school studies (until August 2008 eight terms) with 180 ECTS points on the Theresian Military Academy in the Wiener Neustadt. The studies are focused on "Military Command and Control" (C2) and the academy-leaver graduate to Bachelor.

The career in the Militia is structured in a different way. Here the modular education comprises the so-called one-year volunteer year (de: Einjährig-Freiwilliger [EF]) as well as several courses, seminars, and exercises with a final aptitude test. After an overall service time of five years the promotion to «Leutnant» is possible.

Moreover, the appointment designation Leutnant is possible for leading officials (E1) of the Austrian executive, e.g. the Austrian Federal Police (ge: Bundespolizei) and prison authority personnel (de: Justizwache).

=== Austro-Hungarian Army ===
Until 1918 Leutnant (Hungarian: Hadnagy) was in the Austria-Hungarian Army the lowest CO-rank as well, equivalent to Assistenz-Arzt and Leutnant-Rechnungsführer.

Leutnant rank insignias of the k.u.k. Army
Description			Rank	Insignia	
German	Hungarian	English	class	Army	Mountain infantry
Low grade officers
Leutnant also: Assistenz-Arzt; Leutnant-Rechnungsführer	Hadnagy	Second lieutenant	XI		

== Belgium ==
Rank insignia for Leutnant

Belgian Army

Belgian Air Force

Belgian Medical Service

== Germany ==
Lieutenant Leutnant
- Army and Air Force insignia
- Country: Germany
- Service branch: German Army; German Air Force
- Abbreviation: Lt.
- NATO rank code: OF-1
- Formation: 1871
- Next higher rank: Oberleutnant
- Next lower rank: Oberstabsfeldwebel
- Equivalent ranks: Leutnant zur See (Navy)

The rank of Leutnant has been used in the German armed forces since 1899.

=== Bundeswehr ===
In the Bundeswehr today, a Leutnant will be normally appointed as platoon leader. However, the rank of Leutnant might also be held while a junior officer is studying at the University of the German Federal Armed Forces or at another training or education establishment. The Leutnant of the Bundeswehr belongs to the "Leutnant's rank group" (also: subaltern officer rank group).

==== Rank ====
In Germany, Leutnant (short.: Lt / on lists also: L) is the designation of a soldier of the lowest officer rank. The equivalent in the German Navy (Deutsche Marine) is the Leutnant zur See.

Rank insignias Leutnant» / Leutnant zur See (OF-1)
Uniform (basic version Jägertruppe)	Field uniform (Jägertruppe)	Field uniform (Reservist Logistik)	Field uniform (SanOA (vet.))	Uniform (basic version)	Field uniform	Field uniform (Lw SanOA (dent.))	Shoulder board	Shoulder board (SanOA (hum.))	Cuff title	Mounting loop

Soldiers with that particular rank, are mandated and authorized to provide military orders as to the so-called Superior-subordinate relations to private ranks (de: Mannschaften), NCOs without port épée (de: Unteroffiziere ohne port épée), as well as to Senior NCOs with port épée (de: Unteroffizier mit port épée).

junior Rank; Oberstabsfeldwebel	(German officer rank); Leutnant	senior Rank; Oberleutnant

=== National People's Army ===
In the GDR National People's Army (NPA) the rank Leutnant was the second lowest commissioned offer (CO) rank until 1990. This was in reference to Soviet military doctrine and in line with other armed forces of the Warsaw Pact.

The equivalent rank of the Volksmarine (en: GDR Navy) was the Leutnant zur See, often called simply Leutnant for short. In reference to the Soviet armed forces and to other armed forces of the Warsaw pact Leutnant was the second lowest officer rank until 1990.

Junior Rank; Unterleutnant	National People's Army rank Leutnant (Leutnant zur See)	Senior Rank; Oberleutnant

Rank insignias Leutnant / Leutnant zur See (OF-1)
Land forces	Air Force	GDR Border troops	Volksmarine
N/A			
Leutnant			Leutnant zur See

=== Nazi Germany ===
In Nazi Germany, within the SS and Waffen-SS, the rank of SS-Untersturmführer was considered to be the equivalent of an Leutnant in the German Army. However, in the SA the equivalent to Leutnant was SA-Sturmführer.

== Switzerland ==
Leutnant in Switzerland

Rank insignia
Swiss Army
Introduction

Rank group
Subalternoffiziere (en: Subaltern commissioned officers)
Army / Air Force
Leutnant
Navy
no equivalent
Lower:
Higher:
Chefadjutant
Oberleutnant

In the military of Switzerland the Leutnant (Lieutenant, Tenente) is the lowest commissioned officer rank. Promotion to the next highest rank, Oberleutnant, occurs after three refresher courses (contingent upon good performance) or automatically after six years' service.

For missions outside of Switzerland, the rank Leutnant will be designated in English as Second lieutenant.

=== Swiss Guard ===
Rank insignia for Leutnant

Army
