= SS-Stabsscharführer =

Stabsscharführer (position title or appointment)
- appointment insignia ("double piston rings")
- Country: Nazi Germany
- Service branch: Waffen-SS
- Abbreviation: Staschf
- Rank: senior NCOs, e.g.: Sturmscharführer; Hauptscharführer; Oberscharführer
- Formation: 1938
- Abolished: 1945
- Equivalent ranks: Hauptfeldwebel

Company sergeant major
(Waffen-SS / Wehrmacht)

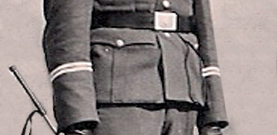
Waffen-SS
SS-Stabsscharführer

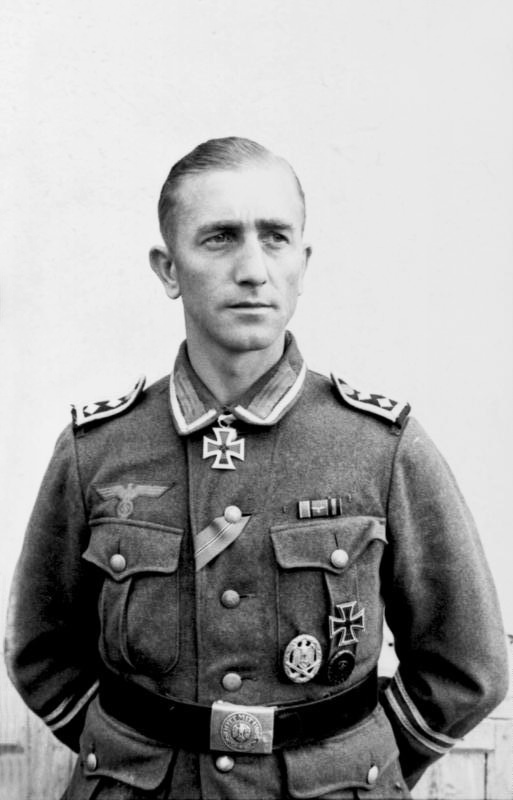
Heer, Luftwaffe
Hauptfeldwebel

SS-Stabsscharführer (short: Stascha; address: Stabsscharführer [ˈʃtaːpsʃaːɐ̯fyːʁɐ]; lit. 'Staff squad leader') was not a rank, but a position title or appointment, mainly used in the Waffen-SS, equivalent to the Hauptfeldwebel of the Wehrmacht (Heer and Luftwaffe) between the years of 1938 to 1945.

Usually it was the senior NCO ("senior squad leader") of his company-sized SS subunit. His duties were largely administrative and he was not expected to accompany his unit into combat. Those holding the function of SS-Stabsscharführer had to be addressed Stabsscharführer regardless of the actual rank title, e.g. Sturmscharführer, Hauptscharführer, or infrequent Oberscharfüher. The position of SS-Stabsscharführer was unique to the Waffen-SS or SS command of concentration camps, and was not used by branches of the Allgemeine-SS (general SS).

In accordance with Hauptfeldwebel of Heer and Luftwaffe, the SS-Stabsscharführer had many nicknames, including Spieß ("Spear") and Mutter der Kompanie ("company mother"). He also wore two rings of NCO braid around the cuff of his sleeves, similar to the Wehrmacht.

The position of Stabsscharführer is most often considered equivalent to a first sergeant in the militaries of other nations, e.g. Commonwealth company sergeant major or U.S. company-level first sergeant.
