= Oberfeldwebel =

Non-commissioned officer rank in German military

- Heer and Luftwaffe shoulder insignia
- Country: Germany
- Service branch: German Army; German Air Force
- Abbreviation: OFw
- Rank: Unteroffiziere mit Portepee grade
- NATO rank code: OR-6
- Pay grade: A 7mA
- Formation: 1920 (historic); 1957
- Next higher rank: Hauptfeldwebel
- Next lower rank: Feldwebel
- Equivalent ranks: Oberbootsmann

Oberfeldwebel (German: [ˈoːbɐˌfɛltveːbl̩]; OFw or OF) is the fourth highest non-commissioned officer (NCO) rank in German Army and German Air Force.

== History ==
The rank was introduced first by the German Reichswehr in 1920. Preferable most experienced Protégée-NCO of the old army have been promoted.

Within the Reichswehr, Oberfeldwebel was taken over as second-highest Protégée-NCO rank by the German Wehrmacht in 1935. In the military branch cavalry, artillery and anti-aircraft artillery it was called Oberwachtmeister.

The equivalent rank to the Oberfeldwebel in the Waffen-SS was the SS-Hauptscharführer from 1938 until 1945.

The rank has been used in the GDR National People's Army from 1956 until 1990 as well.

== Rank information ==
It is grouped as OR6 in NATO, equivalent in the US Army to Staff Sergeant, or in British Army / RAF to Sergeant.

In army/ air force context NCOs of this rank were formally addressed as Herr Oberfeldwebel also informally / short Oberfeld.

The sequence of ranks (top-down approach) in that particular group (Senior NCOs with portepee) is as follows:

- OR-9: Oberstabsfeldwebel / Oberstabsbootsmann
- OR-8: Stabsfeldwebel / Stabsbootsmann
- OR-7: Hauptfeldwebel / Hauptbootsmann
- OR-6: Oberfeldwebel / Oberbootsmann
- OR-6: Feldwebel / Bootsmann

Remark

The abbreviation "OR" stands for "Other Ranks / fr: sous-officiers et militaires du rang / ru:другие ранги, кроме офицероф"!

junior Rank; Feldwebel	(German NCO rank); Oberfeldwebel	senior Rank; Hauptfeldwebel
junior Rank; Feldwebel	(German NCO rank); Oberfeldwebel	Oberfähnrich

== Sources ==
- Die Enzyklopädie in 24 Bänden (1796–2001), Band 5 (in German). Brockhaus. 2001. p. 487. ISBN 3-7653-3665-3.
- Die Enzyklopädie in 24 Bänden (1796–2001), Band 7 (in German). Brockhaus. 2001. p. 185. ISBN 3-7653-3676-9.
