= Feldwebel =

Non-commissioned officer rank

Feldwebel (Fw or F, lit. 'field usher') is a non-commissioned officer (NCO) rank in several countries. The rank originated in Germany, and is also used in Switzerland, Finland, Sweden, and Estonia. The rank has also been used in Russia, Austria-Hungary, occupied Serbia and Bulgaria.

Feldwebel is a contraction of Feld meaning 'field' and Weibel, an archaic word meaning 'usher'. Weibel comes from the Old High German weibôn, meaning to go back and forth (as in 'wobble').

There are variations on Feldwebel, such as Oberstabsfeldwebel ('Superior Staff Field Usher'), which is the highest non-commissioned rank in the German army and air force.

== Feldwebel in different languages ==
The rank is used in several countries: Swedish: fältväbel, Russian: фельдфебель, romanized: fel'dfebel', Bulgarian: фелдфебел, romanized: feldfebel, Finnish: vääpeli and Estonian: veebel.

In Swiss German the spelling Feldweibel is used.

== Austria ==
Feldwebel was a typical infantry rank of the k.u.k. Austro-Hungarian Army (1867–1918).

In the k.u.k. Austro-Hungarian Army Feldwebel was equivalent to:

- Beschlagmeister I. Klasse (Master-Blacksmith 1st class) cavalry
- Feuerwerker (Master-Sergeant, lit. 'fire worker') artillery
- Oberjaeger (Master-Sergeant) of the mountain troops and rifles
- Rechnungs-Unteroffizier I. Klasse (Fiscal sergeant 1st class)
- Regimentshornist (Regimental bugler)
- Regimentstambour (Regimental drummer)
- Wachtmeister (Master-Sergeant) cavalry
- Waffenmeister I. Klasse (Weapon master 1st class) artillery and weapon arsenal
  - Einjährig-Freiwilliger-Feldwebel (Master-Sergeant – volunteer serving one year), and
  - Kadett-Feldwebel (Cadet-Master-Sergeant)

The rank insignia was a gorget patch on the stand-up collar of the so-called Waffenrock (tunic), and consisted of three white stars on 13 mm ragged yellow silk galloon. The gorget patch and the stand-up collar showed the particular Waffenfarbe (corps colour).

Examples (selection)

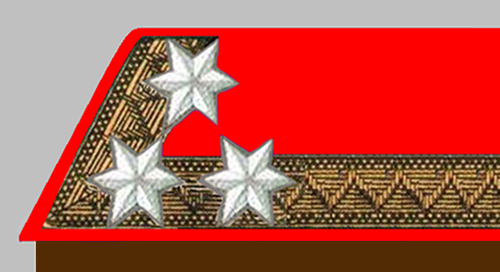
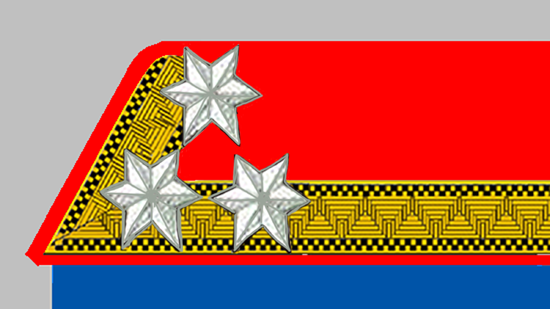
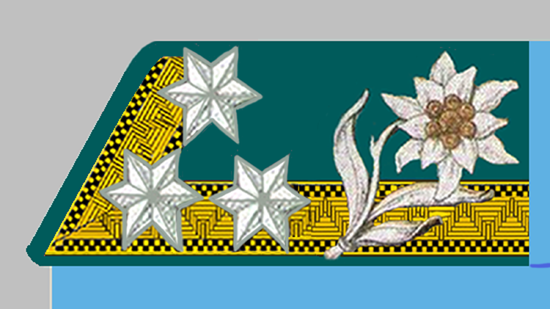
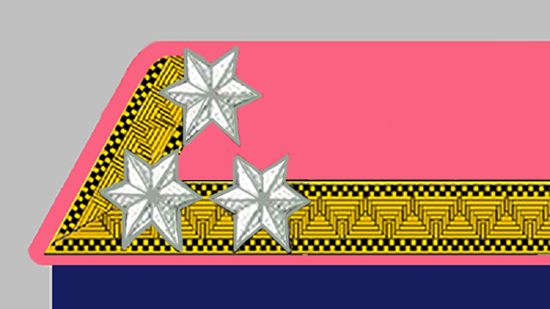
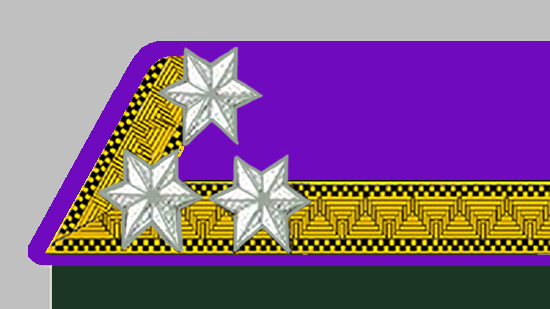
Designation	Non-commissioned officers OR8/ Feldwebel ranks
Rank insignia
Rank description	Feuerwerker	Wachtmeister	Oberjäger	Feldwebel
Branch	Artillery	Cavalry	Mountain infantry	Infantry	Militärwachkorps
(English)	(Artillery Master-Sergeant)	(Cavalry Master-Sergeant)	(Rifle Master-Sergeant)	(Master-Sergeant)	(Master-Sergeant mil. guards)

== Bulgaria ==
In the Bulgarian army, фелдфебел (pronounced feldfebel) existed from the late 19th century to the late 1940s, when the German-type military organization was phased out in favor of a new doctrine, identical to the Soviet one.

== Estonia ==
The Estonian rank of veebel is derived from the name of the German rank Feldwebel.

NATO code	OR-9		OR-8	OR-7	OR-6
Estonian	Ülemveebel	Staabiveebel	Vanemveebel	Veebel	Nooremveebel
Literal translation	Command usher	Staff usher	Senior usher	Usher	Junior usher
Estonian Land Forces
Estonian Land Forces	Sergeant major of the Land Forces	Sergeant major	Master sergeant	Sergeant first class	Staff sergeant
Estonian Navy
Estonian Navy	Master chief petty officer of the Navy	Master chief petty officer	Senior chief petty officer	Chief petty officer 1st class	Chief petty officer 2nd class
Estonian Air Force
Estonian Air Force	Chief master sergeant of the Air Force	Chief master sergeant	Senior master sergeant	Master sergeant	Technical sergeant
Estonian	Ülemveebel	Staabiveebel	Vanemveebel	Veebel	Nooremveebel
NATO code	OR-9		OR-8	OR-7	OR-6

== Finland ==
The Finnish Defence Force uses the ranks of vääpeli and ylivääpeli which are the third and second highest NCO ranks, respectively. Vääpeli is also the highest rank that can be awarded to a female non-conscript NCO who has not completed the volunteer female military service (equivalent to the male conscription service). The Finnish Navy's equivalent rank is pursimies (transl. 'boatswain').

In addition, the Finnish Defence Force uses vääpeli to indicate an NCO position (which might or might not be occupied by an NCO of the rank vääpeli) subordinate to the company commander. The unit's vääpeli is in charge of the company's personnel management as well as supply, provisioning and maintenance, including the maintenance of the premises inhabited by the unit. They are also responsible for maintaining the general order, discipline and unit cohesion. The company's vääpeli is the lowest-ranking FDF position that can conduct a preliminary investigation into suspected service-related crimes. Their powers with regard to punishment are limited to conscripts, who they can punish with either a warning or up to six hours of extra duties.

Rank group	Non-commissioned officer
Finnish Army
Finnish Army	Ylivääpeli; Överfältväbel	Vääpeli; Fältväbel

== Germany ==
=== German Bundeswehr ===
Feldwebel
- Heer and Luftwaffe shoulder insignia
- Country: Germany
- Service branch: German Army; German Air Force
- Abbreviation: Fw
- Rank: Unteroffiziere mit Portepee grade
- NATO rank code: OR-6
- Pay grade: A7
- Formation: 1957
- Next higher rank: Oberfeldwebel
- Next lower rank: Stabsunteroffizier
- Equivalent ranks: Bootsmann

In the modern German Bundeswehr, Feldwebel is considered a senior NCO, due in part to the large number of corporal positions which exist as junior grades.

The modern Bundeswehr NCO grades are as follows:

- Junior NCOs (German: Unteroffiziere ohne Portepee) – Unteroffizier, Stabsunteroffizier (NATO-Rank Code OR 5)
- Fähnrich ranks: Fahnenjunker (OR-5), Fähnrich (OR-6) and Oberfähnrich (OR-7) are ranks only held by Officer aspirants (OA) (Officer candidate or Officer Designate)
- Portepeeunteroffizier (Senior NCOs)

The sequence of ranks (top-down approach) in that particular group (NCOs with portepee or Senior NCOs with portepee) is as follows:

- OR-9: Oberstabsfeldwebel / Oberstabsbootsmann
- OR-8: Stabsfeldwebel / Stabsbootsmann
- OR-7: Hauptfeldwebel / Hauptbootsmann
- OR-6: Oberfeldwebel / Oberbootsmann
- OR-6: Feldwebel / Bootsmann

=== 19th century and Kaiserreich ===
Feldwebel gained its widest usage under the German military beginning from the early 19th century. The highest-ranking non-commissioned officer until 1918, the Feldwebel acted as Company Sergeant Major. By contrast with some other countries, the position and duty of Regimental Sergeant Major never existed in Germany.

From 1877 veteran NCOs could be promoted to the rank of Feldwebel-Leutnant. This Army Reserve officer ranked with the Commissioned Officers, but was always inferior to the lowest Leutnant.

From 1887 the Offizierstellvertreter (Deputy Officer) ranked as a kind of Warrant Officer (more NCO than officer) between Feldwebel and the commissioned officers.

There were three further NCO ranks: Vizefeldwebel (Vice Feldwebel, senior NCO), Sergeant (junior NCO) and Unteroffizier (Lance Sergeant or Corporal, junior NCO). The Gefreiter was not an NCO as he had no powers of authority, and was a higher grade of private soldier.

=== Reichswehr and Wehrmacht ===
After World War I, in the German Reichswehr and Wehrmacht, the Feldwebel rank group was divided into several grades:

- Feldwebel (deputy), in the meaning of platoon sergeant,
- Oberfeldwebel (platoon sergeant, possible appointment to Hauptfeldwebel (in the meaning of company sergeant major),
- Stabsfeldwebel (special rank reserved for 25-year volunteers only).

Feldwebel and above were Unteroffiziere mit Portepee (Senior NCOs); Unterfeldwebel and Unteroffiziere were Unteroffiziere ohne Portepee (Junior NCOs). In 1921, the rank of Sergeant was renamed Unterfeldwebel. Unterfeldwebels did duty as squad/section leaders.

The Stabsfeldwebel rank was reserved for those who had enlisted for 25 year terms of service in the pre-war German military and those who were enlisted for shorter terms were not eligible to hold this rank.

The appointment of Hauptfeldwebel (Company sergeant major/First sergeant) could be held by Stabsfeldwebels or Oberfeldwebels only. NCOs of a lower rank (Feldwebel, Unterfeldwebel, Unteroffizier) holding this position were titled Hauptfeldwebeldiensttuer (i.e. acting Hauptfeldwebel).

==== Rank insignia (1935–1945) ====
In the German Wehrmacht Unteroffiziere ohne Portepee (transl. junior NCO grades) and Unteroffiziere mit Portepee (transl. senior NCO grades) were rank insignia as follows.

Rank insignia Unteroffiziere
Rank group	Unteroffiziere mit Portepee			Unteroffiziere ohne Portepee
Shoulder insignia
Camouflage suit sleeve
Army	Stabsfeldwebel	Oberfeldwebel	Feldwebel	Unterfeldwebel	Unteroffizier
Cavalry and artillery	Stabswachtmeister	Oberwachtmeister	Wachtmeister	Unterwachtmeister	Unteroffizier
Waffen–SS	SS–Sturmscharführer	SS–Hauptscharführer	SS–Oberscharführer	SS–Scharführer	SS–Unterscharführer

=== East Germany (1956–1990) ===
In the German Democratic Republic National People's Army Unteroffiziere ohne Portepee (junior NCO grades) were replaced by Unteroffiziere volunteer, and Unteroffiziere mit Portepee (senior NCO grades) were called Unteroffiziere profesional. The shoulder board rank insignia were as follows.

Rank insignia Unteroffiziere shoulder board
Unteroffiziere volunteer		Unteroffiziere profesional		
Unteroffizier	Unterfeldwebel	Feldwebel	Oberfeldwebel	Stabsfeldwebel
Armoured troops	Border troops	Military engineering	Signal corps	Missile troops and artillery

== Russia ==
The rank of feldfebel (Russian: фельдфебель; plural: фельдфебели feldfebeli) existed in the Imperial Russian Army from 1722 to 1917. A feldfebel held the highest non-commissioned officer (Unteroffizier, Russian: унтер-офицер, romanized: unter-ofitser) rank from 1722 (the introduction of Peter the Great's Table of Ranks) until 1826 (the introduction of the still-higher Unteroffizier ranks Podpraporshchik (Russian: подпрапорщик lit. 'Junior praporschschik' and later Zauryad-praporshchik (зауряд-прапорщик; lit. 'Praporshchik deputy') in 1884). Feldfebeli, even after the introduction of these senior ranks, were usually the most senior non-commissioned officers in a unit and held the positions of the unit's CO senior assistant or Starshina (старшина; Sergeant Major). When they were promoted to Zauryad-praporshchik or Podpraporshchik ranks, but still held the Feldfebel positions, they were authorized to still wear the Feldfebel's bands on their shoulder boards. The cavalry equivalent of this rank was the vakhtmistr or vakhmistr (вахмистр, derived from German Wachtmeister).

Since 1917, Soviet and Russian armies have used the rank of starshina as the rough equivalent of the old feldfebel.

Sequence of ranks
junior rank: Starshy unterofitser	Feldvebel (Wakhtmistr)	senior rank: Podpraporshchik

Rank insignia

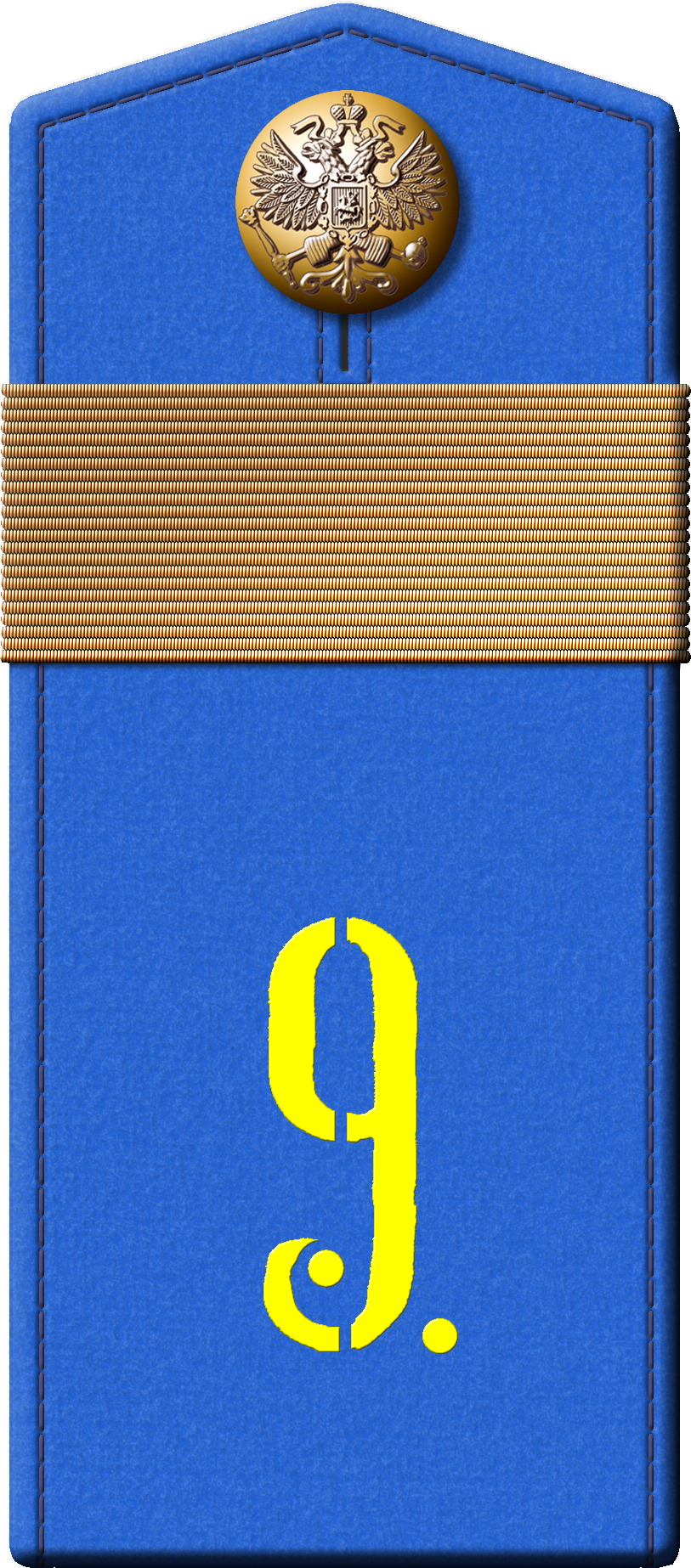
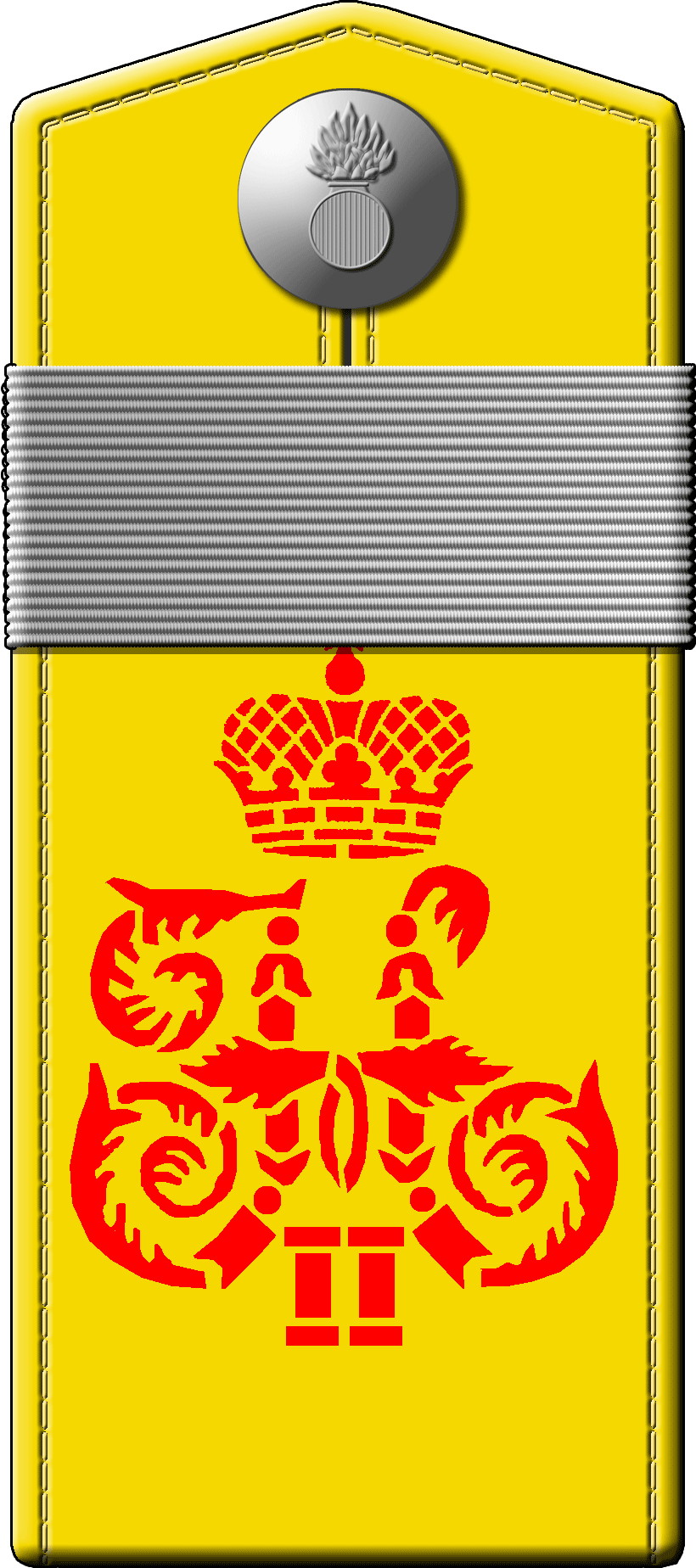
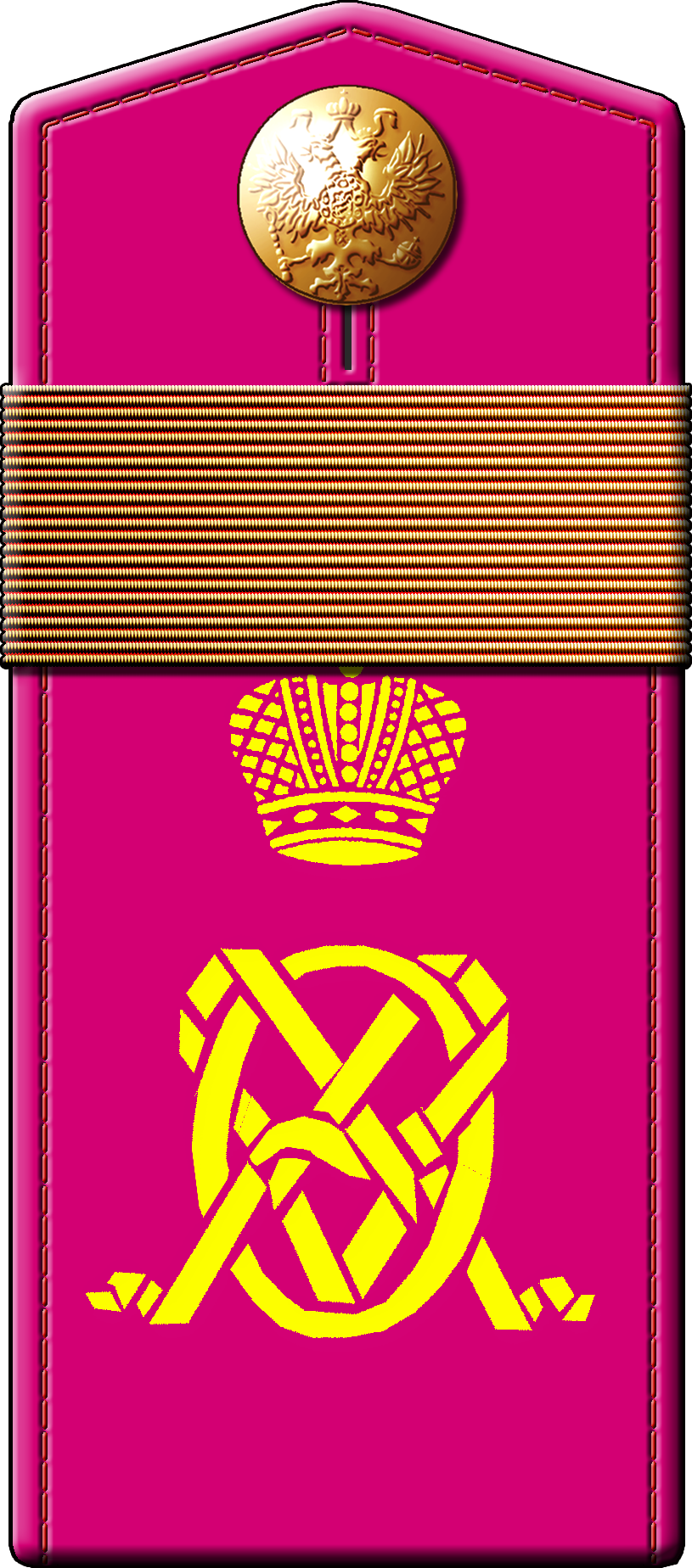
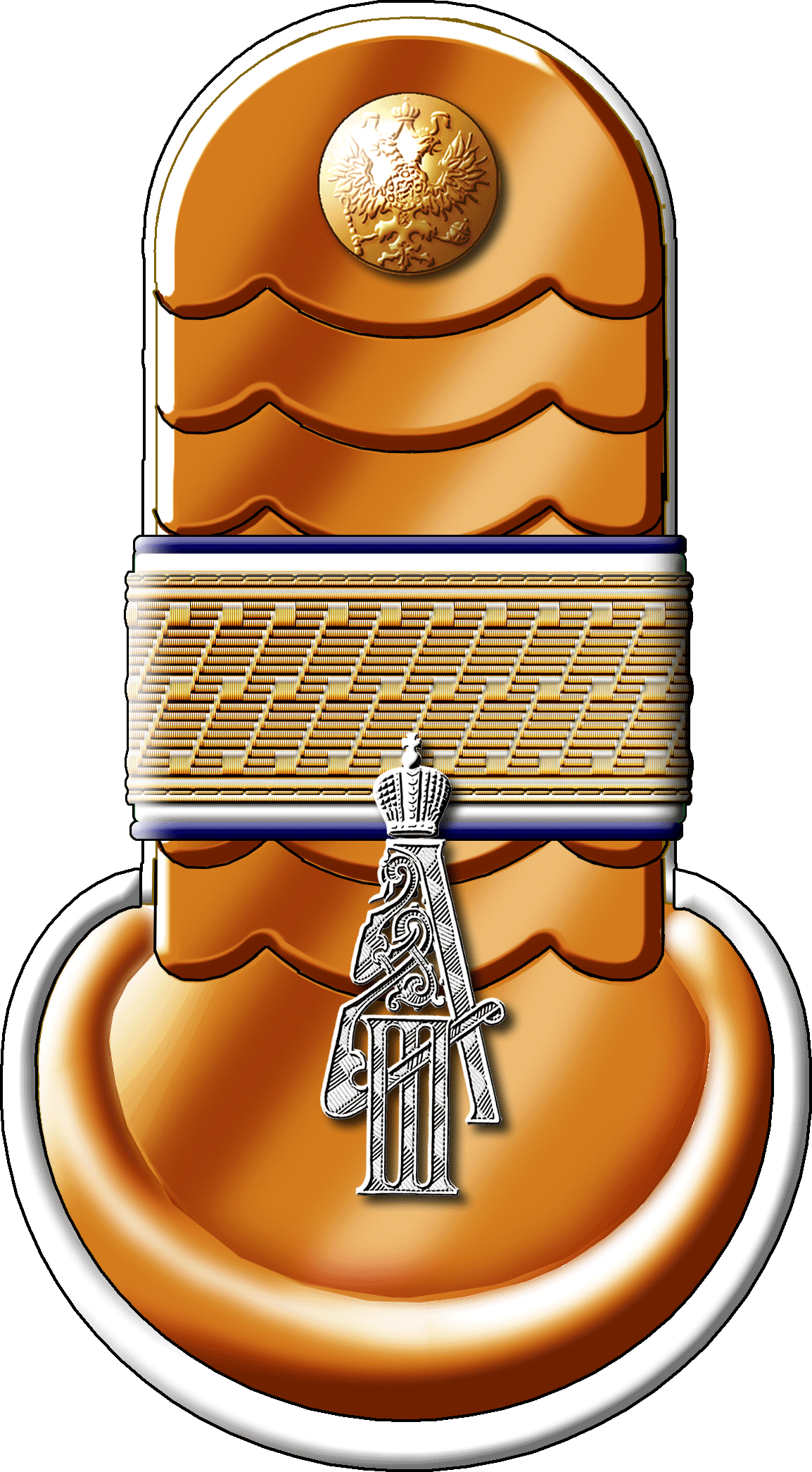
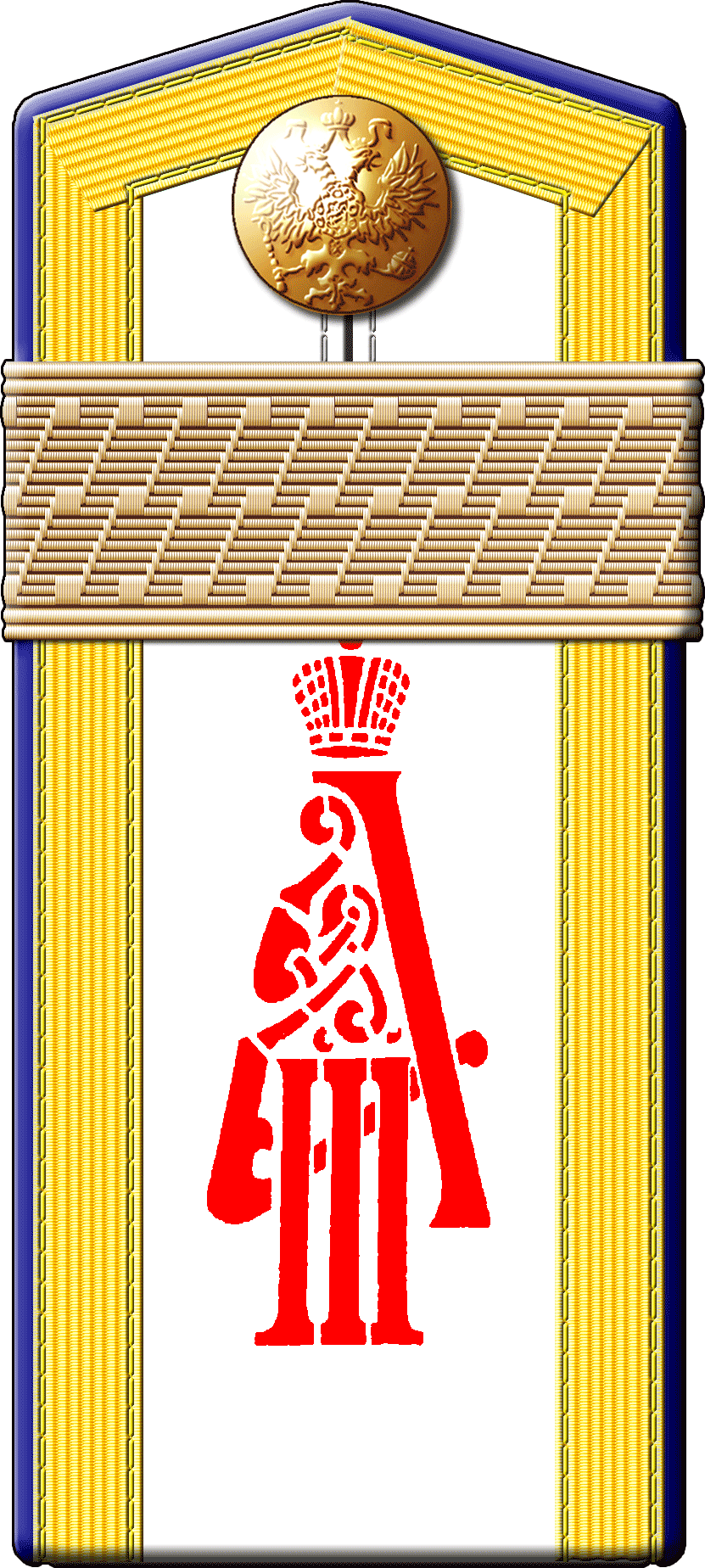
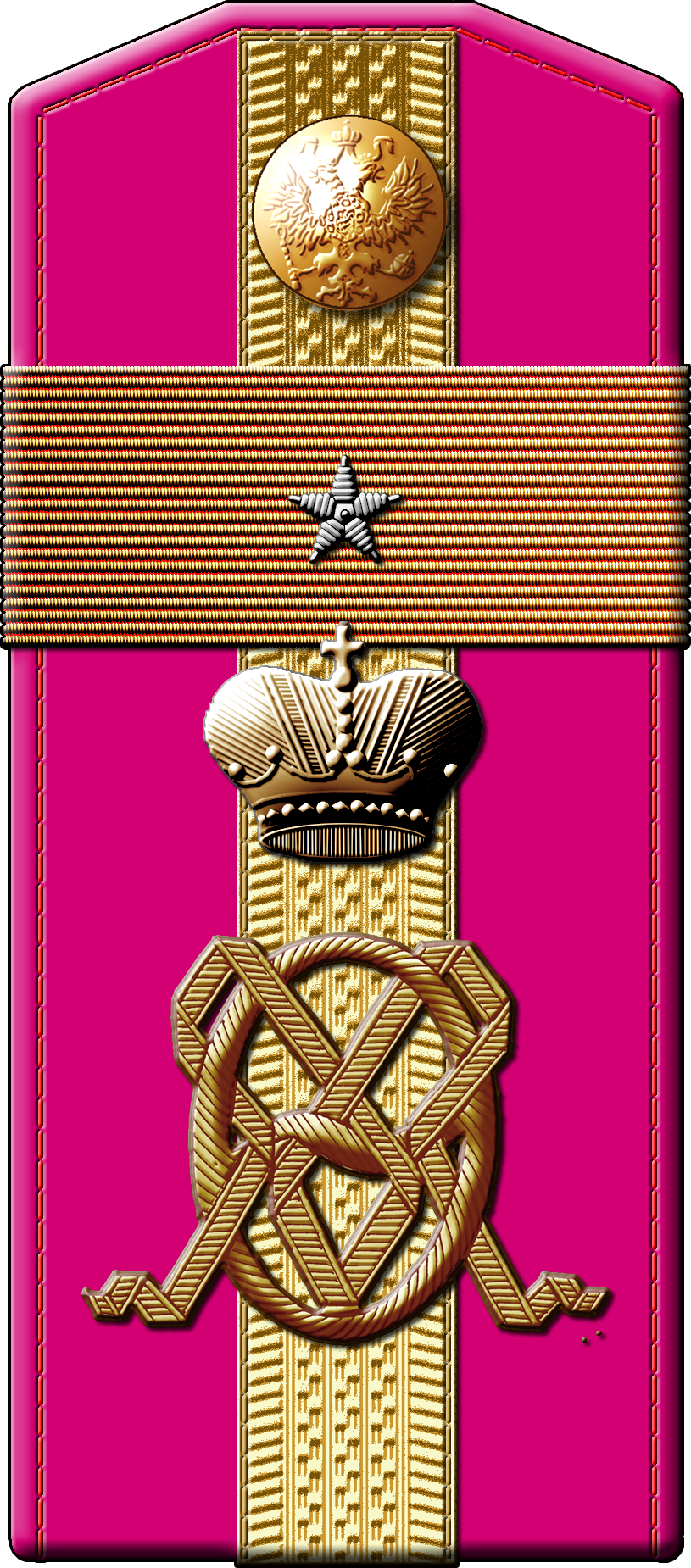
designation	Rank insignia as to the years 1904-1917
shoulder board epaulette
military rank	Feldfebel (1904)	Feldfebel (1907)	Feldfebel of the Dowager Empress; Maria Fyodorovna's; 11th East Siberian rifle regiment (1904)	Wakhtmistr (1908)	Wakhtmistr long-serving, with a monogram from the 1881 to 1894 reign of Emperor Alexander III (1911)	Podpraporshchik on assignment Feldvebel (1914)

== Switzerland ==
Feldweibel is the lowest rank of higher non-commissioned officers in the Swiss Army. Until the Reform XXI agenda, there were two branches of Feldweibels: technical and company level.

The Feldweibel oversees unit-level military service and operations. In 2004, the rank of Hauptfeldweibel was introduced. Since then, only technical specialists have remained in the rank of Feldweibel.

== See also ==
- History of Russian military ranks
- Ranks and insignia of NATO Armies Enlisted (Army)
- Ranks and insignia of NATO

== Sources ==
- BROCKHAUS, Die Enzyklopädie in 24 Bänden (1796–2001), Band 5: 3-7653-3665-3, S. 487, Feldwebel
