= Fähnrich =

Military rank

Fähnrich (German pronunciation: [ˈfɛːnʁɪç]) is an officer candidate rank in the Austrian Bundesheer and German Bundeswehr. The word Fähnrich comes from an older German military title, Fahnenträger (flag bearer), and first became a distinct military rank in Germany on 1 January 1899. However, Fähnrich ranks are often incorrectly compared with the rank of ensign, which shares a similar etymology but is a full-fledged (albeit junior) commissioned officer rank.

In the German Landsknecht armies, recorded from ca. 1480, the equivalent rank of a Cornet existed. The cornet carried the troop standard, also known as a "cornet".

The rank also exists in a few other European military organizations, often with historical ties to the German system. Examples are the Netherlands, Denmark, Sweden, Norway, and Finland (see Fänrik). The French Army has a similar position called an Aspirant.

In the Finnish Army and Air Force, Vänrikki (Fänrik) is the lowest commissioned officer rank, which is granted to the soldiers in the national service that have completed their reserve officer course on the day they are released from their 347-day service. Finnish Vänrikki are thus of equal rank to the German lieutenant (also a platoon leader).

== Austria ==
=== Austrian Bundesheer ===
Officer cadet Fähnrich
- Peaked cap

- Field uniform | service uniform
- Country: Austria
- Service branch: Austrian Armed Forces
- Abbreviation: Fhr
- Non-NATO rank: Student officer
- Formation: 1955
- Next higher rank: Leutnant
- Next lower rank: Vizeleutnant

Fähnrich, short Fhr, is a military student officer rank held by students at the Theresian Military Academy.

=== Austria-Hungary (until 1918) ===
Fähnrich was the lowest officer rank in the k.u.k. Common Army. In 1838 it was renamed to Unterleutnant 2. Gebürnisklasse, from 1849 to Unterleutnant 2. Klasse, since 1868 to Unterleutnant, and finally approximately from 1868 to Leutnant. In 1908 Fähnrich was re-introduced as lowest cadet-officer rank in order to replace the 1869 rank designation Kadett-Offiziersstellvertreter. Fähnrich, Kadett-Offiziersstellvertreter respectively completed training and education on the less famous so-called k.u.k. Kadettenschule. As the Kadett-Offiziersstellvertreter was the highest NCO-rank, became Fähnrich a separate rank-class. However, graduates from the much more famous Militärakademie became the officer patent for Leutnant.

In the k.u. Royal Hungarian Honvéd army Zászlós was the equivalent to the Fähnrich rank. It accounted immediately to the officer corps.

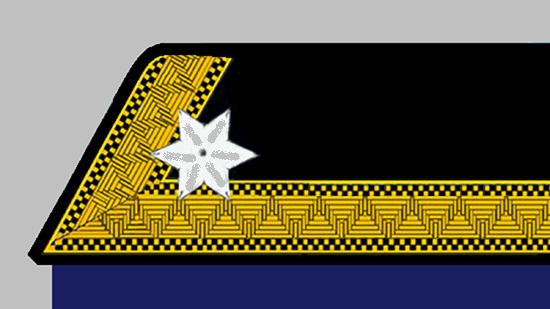
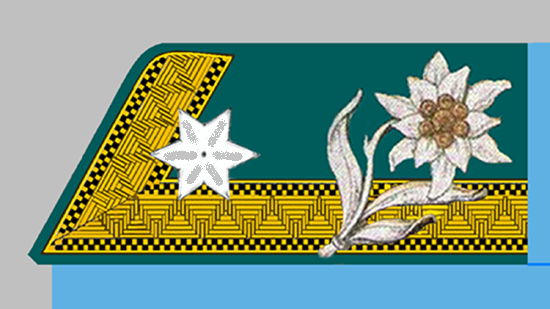
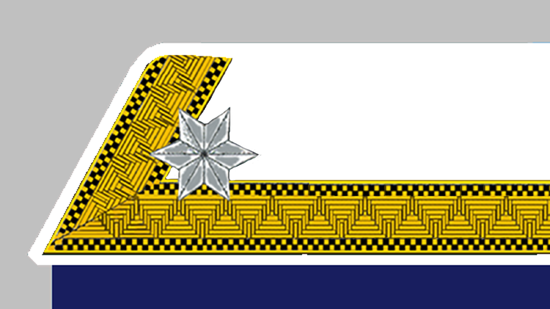
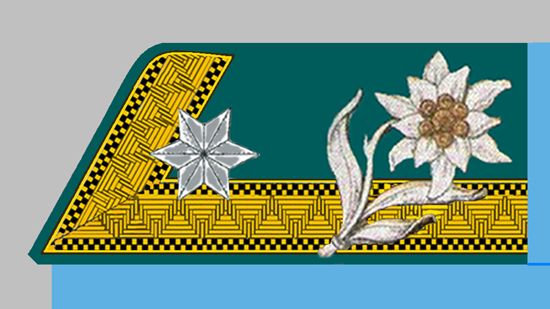
Designation	Cadet officer-deputy until 1908	Fähnrich 1908-1918
Paroli
Rank description	Kadett-Offizierstellvertreter	Fähnrich
(Hungarian)	(Hadapród-Tiszthelyettes)	(Zászlós)

== Denmark ==
Fænrik
- Army and air force insignia (1951–1970)
- Country: Denmark
- Service branch: Royal Danish Army; Royal Danish Navy; Royal Danish Air Force
- Rank group: Commissioned officer (1609–1812); Warrant officer (1951–1970)
- Formation: 1609; 1951
- Abolished: 1812; 1970
- Next higher rank: Overfenrik
- Equivalent ranks: Stykjunker (artillery); Kornet (cavalry)

Fænrik (formerly spelled Fendrich) was a commissioned officer rank used in the Royal Danish Army, equivalent to the cavalry rank of Kornet and stykjunker of the artillery. The rank was later reintroduced as a warrant officer rank also used by the Royal Danish Navy and Royal Danish Air Force.

In 1609, Christian IV of Denmark created a permanent organization with regiments of the Royal Danish Army. A regiment would be assigned one ritmester, one løjtnant, one fænrik, and two korporals.

By 1717, the ranks of Fendrich and Cornet of the Royal Life Guards were placed in the Eight class in the Danish order of precedence, normal Fendrichs and Cornets were placed in the Ninth class. The rank was abolished in 1812.

Between 1951 and 1970, Fenrik and Overfenrik were used by all there branches and were part of Fenriksgruppen, which served as Warrant officers.

== Germany ==
Fähnrich
- Heer and Luftwaffe shoulder insignia
- Country: Germany
- Service branch: German Army; German Air Force
- Abbreviation: Fähnr
- Rank: German NCO rank
- NATO rank code: OR-6
- Non-NATO rank: E-6
- Formation: 1956
- Next higher rank: Oberfähnrich
- Next lower rank: Fahnenjunker
- Equivalent ranks: Fähnrich zur See

=== Bundeswehr ===
A Fähnrich of the Bundeswehr is a soldier who serves in the ranks, first as Fahnenjunker (OR-5, comparable to the junior non-commissioned officer rank Unteroffizier), then in subsequent grades: Fähnrich (OR-6, equivalent to Feldwebel), and Oberfähnrich (OR-7 equivalent to Hauptfeldwebel).

In the German Bundeswehr, an officer candidate (German: Offiziersanwärter) can reach the rank of Fähnrich after 21 months of service. The German Navy equivalent is "Ensign at sea" (German: Fähnrich zur See).

An officer candidate's career is indicated by the enlisted rank with a thin silver cord on the shoulder strap.

NATO code	OR-7	OR-6	OR-5
German Army
German Air Force
	Oberfähnrich	Fähnrich	Fahnenjunker

=== History ===
==== National People's Army ====
Following the creation of the National People's Army, a Fähnrich rank group was created.

== Norway ==
In the Norwegian Armed Forces, the rank of Fenrik is the lowest ranking commissioned officer, with the NATO code of OF-1.

Rank insignia for Fenrik

Army

Navy

Air Force

== Sweden ==
Fänrik (second lieutenant) is a rank in the Swedish Army, Swedish Air Force and in the Swedish Navy (Coastal Artillery 1902–2000, Amphibious Corps 2000–present).

== See also ==
- Fähnrich zur See
