= Stabsbootsmann =

- shoulder board / cuff title / mounting loop
- Country: Germany
- Service branch: German Navy
- Abbreviation: StBtsm
- Rank group: German NCO rank
- NATO rank code: OR-8
- Formation: 1955
- Next higher rank: Oberstabsbootsmann
- Next lower rank: Hauptbootsmann
- Equivalent ranks: Stabsfeldwebel

Stabsbootsmann (StBtsm or SB) is the second highest Non-commissioned officer (NCO) rank in the German Navy. It is grouped as OR8 in NATO, equivalent to First Sergeant, Master Sergeant, or Senior Chief Petty Officer in the US Armed forces, and to Warrant Officer Class 2 in the British Army and Royal Navy.

In navy context NCOs of this rank were formally addressed as Herr/ Frau Stabsbootsmann also informally / short Staber.

== History ==
In 1938, grades were introduced by the German Kriegsmarine depending on the particular career as follows:

- Boatswain (de: Bootsmann): Stabsoberbootsmann (Staff senior boatswain)
- Steersman (de: Steuermann): Stabsobersteuermann (Staff senior steersman)
- Engineman (de: Maschinist): Stabsobermaschinist (Staff senior engineman)

These grades were equivalent to the German Wehrmacht ranks Stabsfeldwebel and Stabswachmeister, or the Waffen-SS grade Stabsscharführer.

Grades Stabsfeldwebel and Stabswachmeister have been used in the GDR National People's Army until 1990 as well. The equivalent in the Volksmarine was Stabsmeister.

The sequence of ranks (top-down approach) in that particular group is as follows:
Unteroffiziere mit Portepee

- OR-9: Oberstabsbootsmann / Oberstabsfeldwebel
- OR-8: Stabsbootsmann / Stabsfeldwebel
- OR-7: Hauptbootsmann / Hauptfeldwebel
- OR-6a: Oberbootsmann / Oberfeldwebel
- OR-6b: Bootsmann / Feldwebel

junior Rank; Hauptbootsmann	Stabsbootsmann	senior Rank; Oberstabsbootsmann
Oberfähnrich zur See	Stabsbootsmann	senior Rank; Oberstabsbootsmann

== Equivalent in other NATO countries ==
- – Premier-maître chef/ Eerste meesterchef
- – Chief Petty Officer 2nd Class
- – Stožerni narednik
- – Seniorsergent
- – Premier maître
- – Αρχικελευστής/ Archikelefstis
- – no equivalent
- – capo di seconda classe
- – no equivalent
- – no equivalent
- – Chorąży marynarki
- – Sargento-chefe
- – Brigada
- – Warrant Officer Class 2
- – Senior Chief Petty Officer

== See also ==
- Ranks of the German Bundeswehr
- Rank insignia of the German Bundeswehr

== Bibliography ==
- Mallmann Showell, Jak P. (2002) [1999]. German Navy Handbook 1939–1945. Stroud, UK: Sutton Publishing. ISBN 0-7509-3205-8.
