= Oberstabsbootsmann =

Non-commissioned officer rank in German Navy

Oberstabsbootsmann

shoulder board / cuff title / mounting loop

Rank insignia
German NCO rank
Introduction
1955
Rank group
Non-commissioned officers
Navy
Oberstabsbootsmann
Army / Air Force
Oberstabsfeldwebel
NATO
equivalent
OR-9
Army
Sergeant Major
Air Force
Chief Master Sergeant
Navy
- Sergeant Major
- Master Gunnery Sergeant

Oberstabsbootsmann (OStBtsm or OSB) is the highest Non-commissioned officer (NCO) rank in the German Navy. It is grouped as OR9 in NATO, equivalent to a Master Chief Petty Officer in the United States Navy, and a Warrant Officer Class 1 in the British Royal Navy.

In Navy context, NCOs of this rank were formally addressed as Herr/ Frau Oberstabsbootsmann also informally/ short Oberstaber.

The rank was introduced in the German Navy equivalent to the German Heer and German Luftwaffe grad Oberstabsfeldwebel in 1995, and belongs to the grad group Unteroffiziere mit Portepee.

The sequence of ranks (top-down approach) in that particular group is as follows:
Unteroffiziere mit Portepee

- OR-9: Oberstabsbootsmann / Oberstabsfeldwebel
- OR-8: Stabsbootsmann / Stabsfeldwebel
- OR-7: Hauptbootsmann / Hauptfeldwebel
- OR-6a: Oberbootsmann / Oberfeldwebel
- OR-6b: Bootsmann / Feldwebel

Remark

The abbreviation "OR" stands for "Other Ranks / fr: sous-officiers et militaires du rang / ru:другие ранги, кроме офицероф"!

junior Rank; Stabsbootsmann	(German NCO rank); Oberstgabsbootsmann	senior Rank; Leutnant zur See

See also

== Equivalent in other NATO countries ==
- – Maître principal-Chef (Oppermeester-Chef) and Maître-principal (Oppermeester)
- – Chief Petty Officer of the Navy, Canadian Forces Chief Warrant Officer, and Chief Petty Officer 1st Class
- – Časnički namjesnik
- – Chefsergent
- – Major and Maître principal
- – Ανθυπασπιστής/ Anthypaspistis
- – Petty officer/ specialist
- – capo di prima classe
- – Adjudant-onderofficer
- – No Equivalent
- – Starszy chorąży sztabowy marynarki, Starszy chorąży marynarki
- – Sargento-mor
- – Suboficial mayor, Subteniente
- – Warrant Officer Class 1
- – Master Chief Petty Officer of the Navy, Command master chief petty officer, and Master chief petty officer

See also

== History ==
=== Germany ===
The rank has never been used before by the Reichsmarine, the Kriegsmarine as well as in the GDR Volksmarine.

=== Austria-Hungary ===
rank insignia Oberstabsbootsmann

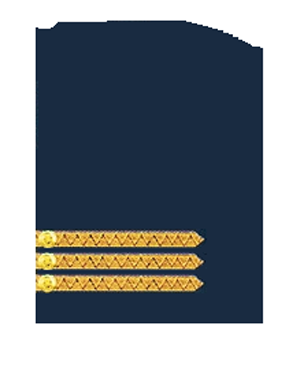
sleeve

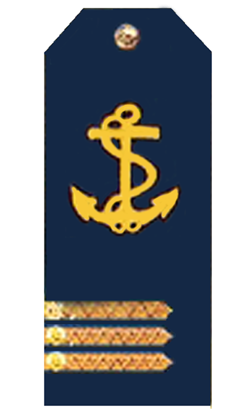
shoulder

Waffenfarbe) (k.u.k. Kriegsmarine))

Oberstabsbootsmann was the highest senior NCO-rank in the k.u.k. Austro-Hungarian Navy (1786 until 1918). It was equivalent to the ranks Stabsfeldwebel (Törzsörmester) / Stabswachtmeister / Stabsfeuerwerker / Stabsoberjäger of the k.u.k. Common Army.

The sequence of ranks (top-down approach) in that particular group was as follows:

- Oberstgabsbootsmann
- Stabsbootsmann
- Unterbootsmann

See also

Junior rank Stabsbootsmann	(k.u.k. Kriegsmarine rank); Oberstgabsbootsmann	Senior rank Seekadett
