= Bootsmann =

Bootsmann (lit. 'Boatswain') is a naval rank used in some navies.

== Germany ==
Boatswain Bootsmann (German)
- Shoulder and sleeve insignia
- Country: Germany
- Service branch: German Navy
- Abbreviation: Btsm
- Rank group: Non-commissioned officer
- Next higher rank: Oberbootsmann
- Next lower rank: Obermaat
- Equivalent ranks: Feldwebel

The German term Bootsmann translates to Boatswain, i.e. the senior crewman of the deck department.

In a military context, Bootsmann (Btsm or B) is the lowest Portepeeunteroffizier (NCO with portepeé) rank in the German Navy. It belongs to the particular rank group Senior NCOs with port épée. It is grouped as OR6 in NATO, equivalent to Petty Officer First Class in the US Navy, and to Petty Officer in the British Royal Navy.

In navy context NCOs of this rank were formally addressed as Herr Bootsmann also informally / short Bootsmann.

The sequence of ranks (top-down approach) in that particular group is as follows:
Unteroffiziere mit Portepee

- OR-9: Oberstabsbootsmann / Oberstabsfeldwebel
- OR-8: Stabsbootsmann / Stabsfeldwebel
- OR-7: Hauptbootsmann / Hauptfeldwebel
- OR-6: Oberbootsmann / Oberfeldwebel
- OR-6: Bootsmann / Feldwebel

== Russia ==
These names were adopted for the Russian Navy as botsman (боцман) botsmanmat (боцманмат) by Peter the Great, among many other Prussian and Holland military ranks; they were initially treated as positions rather than ranks.

== NATO code ==
While the rank is used in a number of NATO countries, it is ranked differently depending on the country.

NATO code	Country	English equivalent	
NATO code	Country	UK	US
OR-7	Finland	Chief petty officer	
OR-6	Germany, Latvia, Netherlands	Petty officer	Petty officer first class
OR-5	Netherlands	Petty officer	Petty officer second class
OR-4	Poland	Leading rate	Petty officer third class

== See also ==
- Ranks of the German Bundeswehr
- Rank insignia of the German Bundeswehr
- Ranks and insignia of NATO navies enlisted
