= Oberstabsfeldwebel =

Highest NCO rank in German Army and Air Force

- Heer and Luftwaffe shoulder insignia
- Country: Germany
- Service branch: German Army; German Air Force
- Abbreviation: OStFw
- Rank: German NCO rank
- NATO rank code: OR-9
- Non-NATO rank: E-9
- Formation: 1955
- Next higher rank: Leutnant
- Next lower rank: Stabsfeldwebel
- Equivalent ranks: Oberstabsbootsmann

Oberstabsfeldwebel (OStFw or OSF, lit. 'Senior staff field usher') is the highest Non-commissioned officer (NCO) rank in German Army and German Air Force. It is grouped as OR-9 in NATO, equivalent to a sergeant major in the United States Army and a Warrant Officer Class 1 in the British Army. Attainment of this rank requires at least sixteen years since promotion to feldwebel and at least six years since promotion to hauptfeldwebel

In army/ air force context NCOs of this rank were formally addressed as Herr Oberstabsfeldwebel also informally / short Oberstaber.

The rank was introduced in the German Heer equivalent to the Marine grade Oberstabsbootsmann in 1955, and belongs to the grad group Unteroffiziere mit Portepee.

== History ==
The rank is a comparatively new rank, and had not been used by any German military prior to in 1955. The Kriegsmarine, did however have a Stabsoberfeldwebel, used from 1939 to 1945.

== Rank sequence ==
The sequence of ranks (top-down approach) in that particular group (Senior NCOs with portepee) is as follows:

- OR-9: Oberstabsfeldwebel / Oberstabsbootsmann
- OR-8: Stabsfeldwebel / Stabsbootsmann
- OR-7: Hauptfeldwebel / Hauptbootsmann
- OR-6a: Oberfeldwebel / Oberbootsmann
- OR-6b: Feldwebel / Bootsmann

== Sources ==
- BROCKHAUS, Die Enzyklopädie in 24 Bänden (1796–2001), Band 5: 3-7653-3665-3, S. 487, Definition: Oberstabsfeldwebel
- BROCKHAUS, Die Enzyklopädie in 24 Bänden (1796–2001), Band 7: 3-7653-3676-9, S. 185, Oberstabsfeldwebel
