= Stabsfeldwebel =

German military rank

- Heer and Luftwaffe shoulder insignia
- Country: Germany
- Service branch: German Army; German Air Force
- Abbreviation: StFw
- Rank group: Unteroffiziere mit Portepee
- NATO rank code: OR-8
- Pay grade: A 9
- Formation: 1938
- Next higher rank: Oberstabsfeldwebel
- Next lower rank: Hauptfeldwebel
- Equivalent ranks: Stabsbootsmann

Stabsfeldwebel (StFw or SF; lit. 'Staff field usher') is the second highest non-commissioned officer (NCO) rank in German Army and German Air Force. It is grouped as OR-8 in NATO, equivalent to a First Sergeant in the United States Army, and to Warrant Officer Class 2 in the British Army. Promotion to the rank requires at least twelve years total active duty, of which at least eleven years have elapsed since promotion to unteroffizier, with at least ten years since promotion to stabsunteroffizier, and nine years since promotion to feldwebel. In army/ air force context NCOs of this rank were formally addressed as Herr Stabsfeldwebel also informally / short Staber.

== History ==
=== Austria-Hungary ===
The ranks Stabsfeldwebel, Stabsoberjäger, Stabsfeuerwerker and Stabswachtmeister were introduced to the Austro-Hungarian Army in 1913.

=== Germany ===
The rank was introduced in 1938 by the German Army as the highest NCO rank, and was equivalent to the Kriegsmarine's Stabsoberfeldwebel grades (Stabsoberbootsmann, Stabsobersteuermann and Stabsobersteuwermann).

The rank was only named Stabsfeldwebel within the infantry, as other services had other traditions and names. In the cavalry and artillery the rank was called Stabswachtmeister, and in the Waffen-SS it was called SS-Sturmscharführer.

The rank was also used in the GDR Land Forces of the National People's Army and was equivalent to Stabsobermeister in the Volksmarine.

== Rank sequence ==
The sequence of ranks (top-down approach) in that particular group (Senior NCOs with portepee) is as follows:

- OR-9: Oberstabsfeldwebel / Oberstabsbootsmann
- OR-8: Stabsfeldwebel / Stabsbootsmann
- OR-7: Hauptfeldwebel / Hauptbootsmann
- OR-6: Oberfeldwebel / Oberbootsmann
- OR-6: Feldwebel / Bootsmann

== Sources ==
- BROCKHAUS, Die Enzyklopädie in 24 Bänden (1796–2001), Band 5: 3-7653-3665-3, p. 487, Definition: Stabsfeldwebel
- BROCKHAUS, Die Enzyklopädie in 24 Bänden (1796–2001), Band 7: 3-7653-3676-9, p. 185, Stabsfeldwebel
