= Hauptfeldwebel (assignment) =

Position in the German Wehrmacht

Hauptfeldwebel (Wehrmacht) (position title or appointment)
- appointment insignia, ("double piston rings")
- Country: Germany
- Service branch: German Army
- Abbreviation: HptFw
- Rank: Senior NCOs, e.g.: Oberfeldwebel or; Feldwebel
- Formation: 1938
- Abolished: 1945
- Equivalent ranks: SS-Stabsscharführer

Company sergeant major
(Wehrmacht / Waffen-SS)

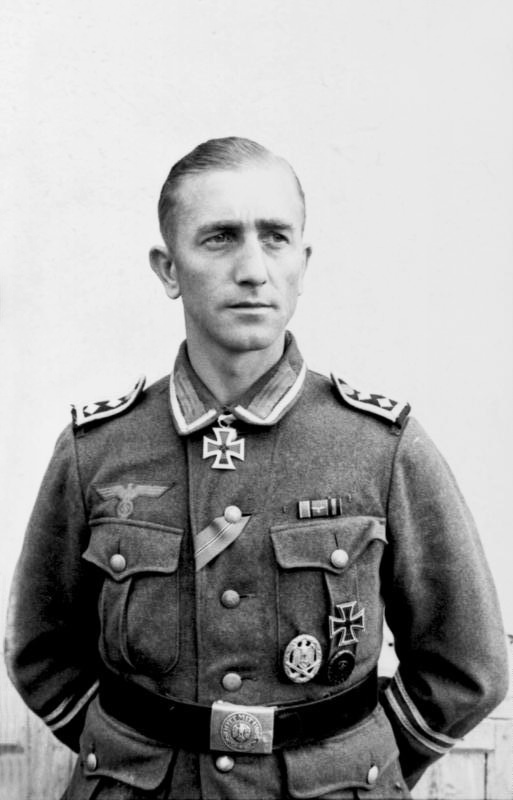
Heer, Luftwaffe
Hauptfeldwebel

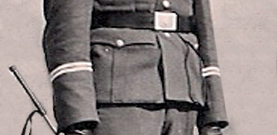
Waffen-SS
SS-Stabsscharführer

In the German Wehrmacht, Hauptfeldwebel (German: [ˈhaʊ̯ptˌfɛltveːbl̩], lit. 'Senior field usher'; short: HptFw; address: Herr Hauptfeldwebel) was not a rank but a position title, assignment or appointment, equivalent to the Commonwealth company sergeant major or U.S. company-level first sergeant. There was one such non-commissioned officer (NCO) in every infantry company, artillery battery, cavalry squadron, etc. He was the senior NCO of his subunit, but his duties were largely administrative and he was not expected to accompany his unit into an assault or a firefight.

The Hauptfeldwebel had many nicknames, including Spieß ("Spear") and Mutter der Kompanie ("mother of the company"). He wore two 10 mm broad rings of NCO braid around the cuff of his sleeves, nicknamed Kolbenringe ("piston rings"), and carried a Meldetasche (reporting pouch) tucked into the tunic front, in which he carried blank report forms, rosters and other papers related to his duties. The German Army had no equivalent of the Commonwealth regimental sergeant major.

The appointment could be held by a senior non-commissioned officer (Unteroffizier mit Portepee), normally Stabsfeldwebel or Oberfeldwebel. If the billet was filled out of necessity by an Unteroffizier ohne Portepee, he was termed a Hauptfeldwebeldiensttuer, or "one serving as Hauptfeldwebel." The equivalent appointment in anglophone armed forces might have been company sergeant major or U.S. company-level first sergeant.

== Other armed forces ==
=== Waffen-SS ===
In the Waffen-SS the equivalent to the appointment Hauptfeldwebel in Heer and Luftwaffe, was the SS-Stabsscharführer until 1945. The traditional nicknames "spear" and "company mother" were used as well. He also wore two rings of NCO braid around the cuff of his sleeves, similar to the Wehrmacht.

=== National People's Army ===
In the National People's Army (1956-1990) Hauptfeldwebel was also an appointment, held by a senior non-commissioned officer ranks, e.g. Oberfeldwebel or Stabsfeldwebel later Fähnrich. It was used in

- Landstreitkräfte
- Luftstreitkräfte
- Grenztruppen

The appointment insignia on the uniform jacket and the overcoat, were almost identical to those used in the Wehrmacht until 1945, but constisted of one "piston ring" around each cuff only. The nicknames were analogue to the Wehrmacht "spear" and "company mother".

=== Bundeswehr ===
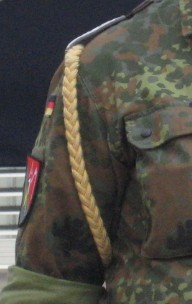
Kompaniefeldwebel insignia in Bundeswehr; a golden lanyard.

Today, the former billet Hauptfeldwebel as a company's Senior NCO has become a regular rank between Oberfeldwebel and Stabsfeldwebel. The position previously known as Hauptfeldwebel is now called Kompaniefeldwebel, while the nicknames - and, in their general outlines, the duties - have remained. Kompaniefeldwebel often have the rank of Oberstabsfeldwebel now, though.

(Army)		(Air Force)	
service dress	field uniform	service dress	field uniform
