= Uniforms and insignia of the Kriegsmarine =

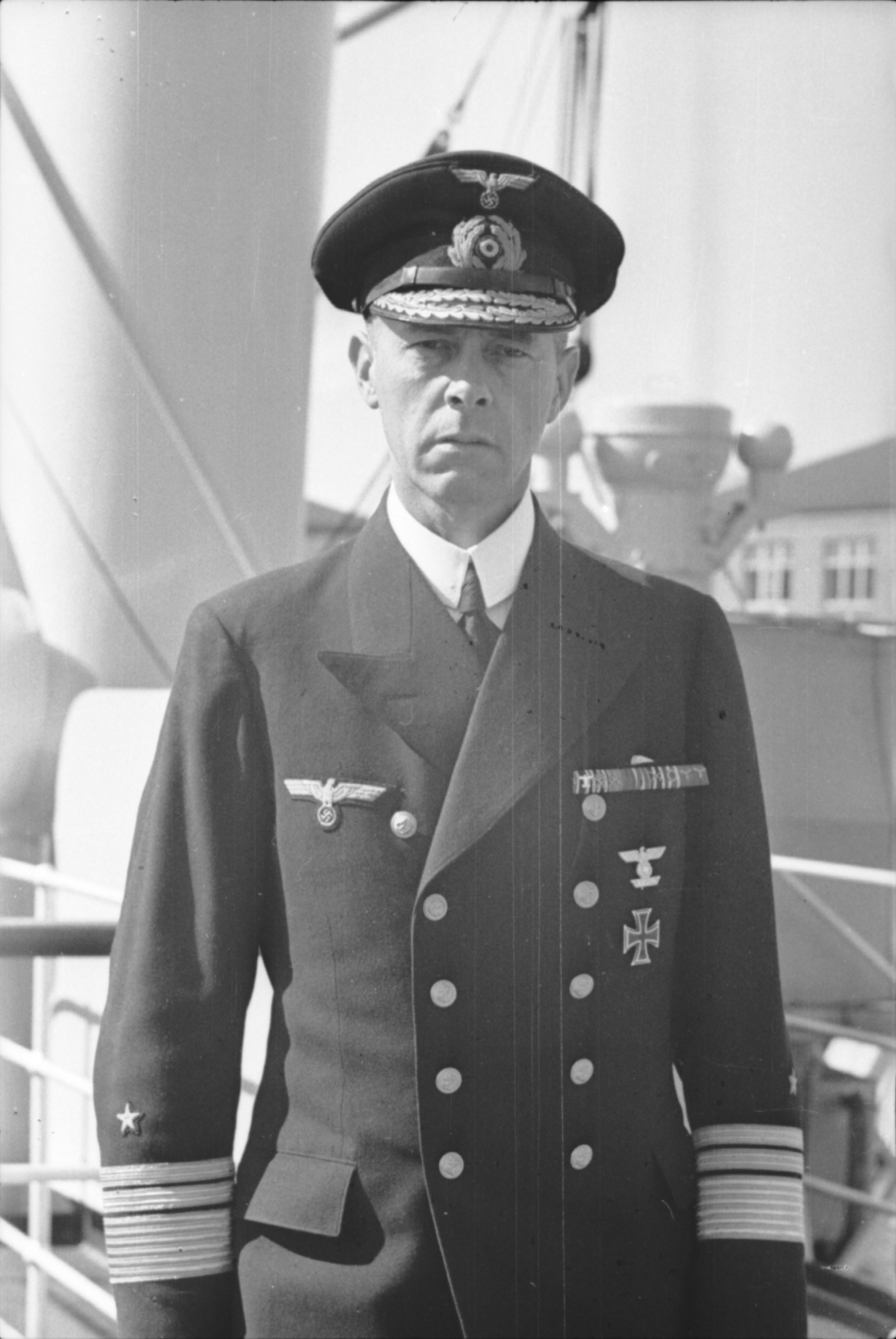
German Vice Admiral Günther Lütjens during World War II

The Kriegsmarine was the navy of Nazi Germany prior to and during World War II. Kriegsmarine uniform design followed that of the preexisting Reichsmarine, itself based on that of the First World War Kaiserliche Marine. Kriegsmarine styles of uniform and insignia had many features in common with those of other European navies, all derived from the British Royal Navy of the 19th century, such as officers' frock coats, sleeve braid, and the "sailor suit" uniform for enlisted personnel and petty officers.

== Basic structure ==
The basic structure of Kriegsmarine uniforms and insignia was divided into 5 categories of personnel:

1. Matrosen (Mannschaften = Seamen enlisted personnel, usually serving for a short term of enlistment
2. Maate (Unteroffiziere ohne Portepee = Technical specialist, the equivalent of a Petty Officer
3. Feldwebel (Portepeeunteroffiziere, also Unteroffiziere mit Portepee = having a position between Petty Officer and Warrant Officer
4. Offiziere = Naval Officers
5. Admiralität, also Admiräle = Flag Officers

Naval officers wore blue colored uniforms with rank displayed by both sleeve stripes and epaulets. Regular line officers (Seeoffiziere) wore sleeve stripes beneath a gold star. Staff officers displayed a unique sleeve emblem in place of the star and also wore this insignia centered on their shoulder epaulets. When writing their rank in correspondence, staff officers would include a staff designator such as Kapitänleutnant (Ing.) to indicate their career field. Specialty officers, which included all administrative career fields, wore silver coat buttons instead of gold. A further classification for officers was that of Sonderführer. These officers were either technical or administrative specialists, in highly specific career fields, who wore the uniforms and insignia of line officers.

Seaman displayed rank through the use of sleeve chevrons and badges. Enlisted sailors, who wore no insignia, were known by the generic term Matrose and used a rating system similar to other European navies of the day. Rating badges in the form of a small patch were worn on the upper left sleeve and indicated the particular specialty of the sailor in question. The enlistment system of the Kriegsmarine was designed to differentiate between those sailors wishing to make the navy a career and those simply completing a standard tour of enlistment. Those who were drafted, or who had no aspirations to become Petty Officers, could advance to become Matrosengefreiter (literally "Seaman Corporals"). Special grades existed for those sailors with six and eight years of service, denoted by embroidered sleeve chevrons. A further classification for Seaman was that of Unteroffizieranwärter. Such seaman were recognized as in training to become Petty officers and wore a silver grey bar beneath their sleeve chevron while in training and a "nested" chevron bar once training was complete. All seaman in petty officer training were denoted in correspondence as "(UA)" after their name and standard rank.

Petty officers in the Kriegsmarine were known by the title Maat. Once advanced to the grade of petty officer, sailors were addressed, both verbally and in correspondence, by their rate followed by the term Maat. For instance, a boatswain petty officer would be referred to as Bootsmannmaat while a leading torpedoman petty officer would be known as Mechanikerobermaat. Petty officers wore special collar patches to denote their rank and a large rating badge on their left shoulder. On service coats and frocks, regular sailors wore a simple blue collar tab to differentiate between the petty officers.

Feldwebel (PO1 to CWO) wore shoulder boards on all uniforms as their primary means of rank with a rating symbol centered on the shoulder strap. Unteroffiziere mit Portepee uniforms were nearly identical to those of officers, except that the uniform rarely was worn in dress. Full dress uniforms also did not exist for Unteroffiziere, with the "lesser dress" typically the highest type of uniform that would be worn at the most formal of functions. The Unteroffiziere mit Portepee were known by the Feldwebel ranks (Portepeeunteroffiziere) but in both verbal and written correspondence were referred to by their rate. For instance, a pharmacist would be known as a Sanitätsfeldwebel while a senior machinist would be referred to as an Obermaschinist. For those with over ten to twelve years of service, the title Stabs would be added to their rate, i.e. Stabssteuermann or Stabsoberfunkmeister.

Navy officer designators:*Engineering (Ing.) Leutnant zur See. *Weapons (W.). *Coastal Artillery (M.A.) Oberleutnant zur See. *Mine Warfare (W.). *Signals (N.T.) Kapitänleutnant *Torpedoman (T.). *Medical (S.) Marineoberstabsarzt. *Administration (V.).

*left: Matrosengefreiter as Unteroffizieranwärter (UA): silvery bar, indicating Petty Officer training in progress. *right: Matrosengefreiter as UA: silvery half-angle, indicating Petty Officer training passed

Bootsmann (PO1)

Oberfeldwebel
(WO)

Stabsoberfeldwebel
(CWO)

== Uniform types ==
=== Dress uniforms ===
The Kriegsmarine full dress uniform (Grosse Uniform) was worn typically by officers ranked Korvettenkapitän and above. The uniform consisted of a double breasted midnight blue frock coat worn with a white swordbelt, full sized medals, sword, large epaulets, and a cocked hat (Zweispitz). There were two modifications to this uniform worn by all officer ranks: Grosser Gesellschaftsanzug which was an evening dress version of the uniform with bow tie, short open mess jacket, and a cummerbund. The Kleiner Gesellschaftsanzug was a "toned down" version of the dress uniform worn with a ribbon bar, dagger in place of full sword, a white service cap, and standard epaulets. A third category was the "walking out dress" (Ausgehanzug) which was essentially a standard service uniform worn with epaulets, belt, and sword or dagger.

Officer dress uniforms

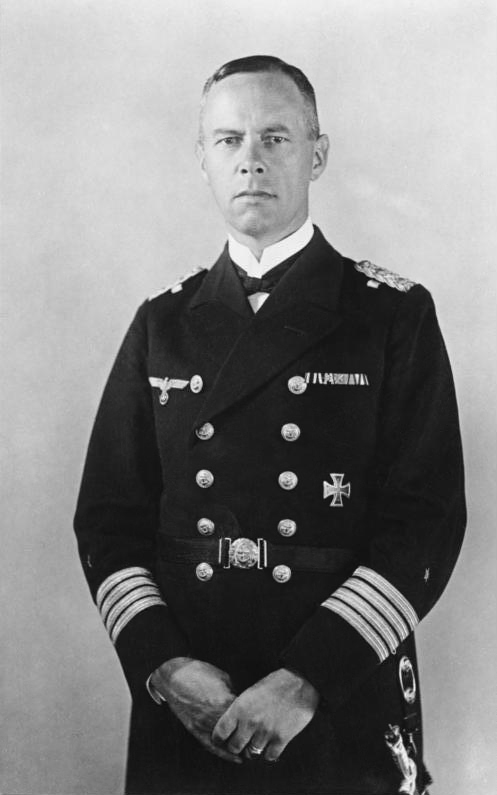
"Walking-out" dress

=== Service uniforms ===
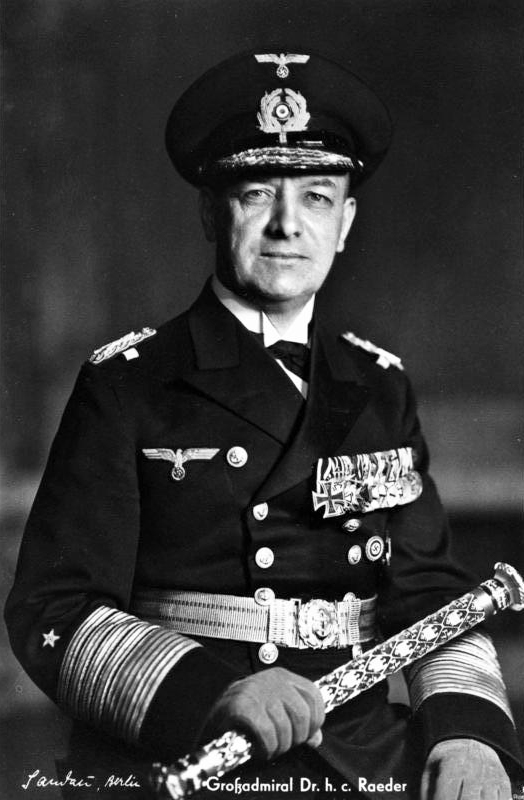
Photo of Erich Raeder in the full officer service uniform. The uniform was worn with a raised necktie, both shoulder epaulets and sleeve stripes to denote rank, as well as full medals and ribbons. In day-to-day operations, officers often wore the "lesser service uniform" with no epaulets, regular tie, and minimal decorations.

The Dienstanzug (Service uniform) was worn in headquarters settings and constituted (for officers) of a double breasted naval coat with sleeve stripes worn with ribbons, medals, badges, and a white dress belt. A raised collar white shirt with black neck-tie was worn underneath. The Kleiner Dienstanzug (lesser service uniform), allowed the officer to wear a normal collared shirt with a plain black tie. The lesser uniform was also typically worn without a full ribbon bar or belt, but still with highly notable awards such as the Knight's Cross, Iron Cross or German Cross. The officer uniform was colored midnight-blue (Note: Kriegsmarine uniforms were discernibly very dark blue, unlike US and UK "blue" Navy uniforms which are effectively black.) and the double-breasted jacket had ten brass buttons and a matching peaked cap.

Officer service uniforms

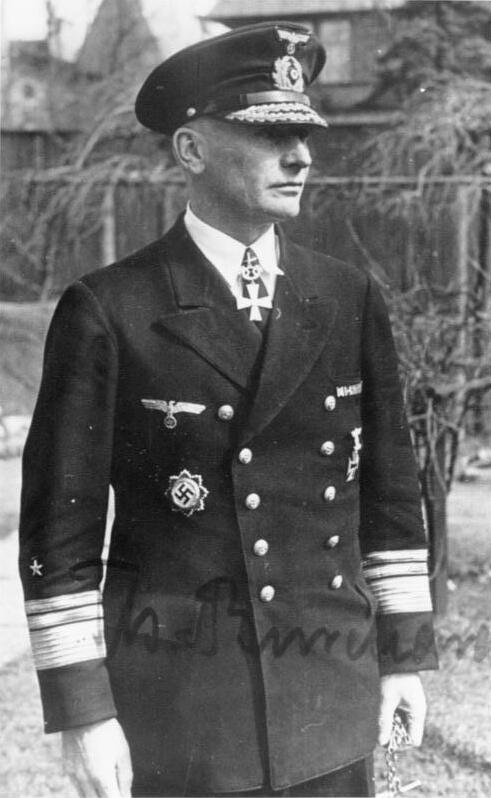
Vizeadmiral

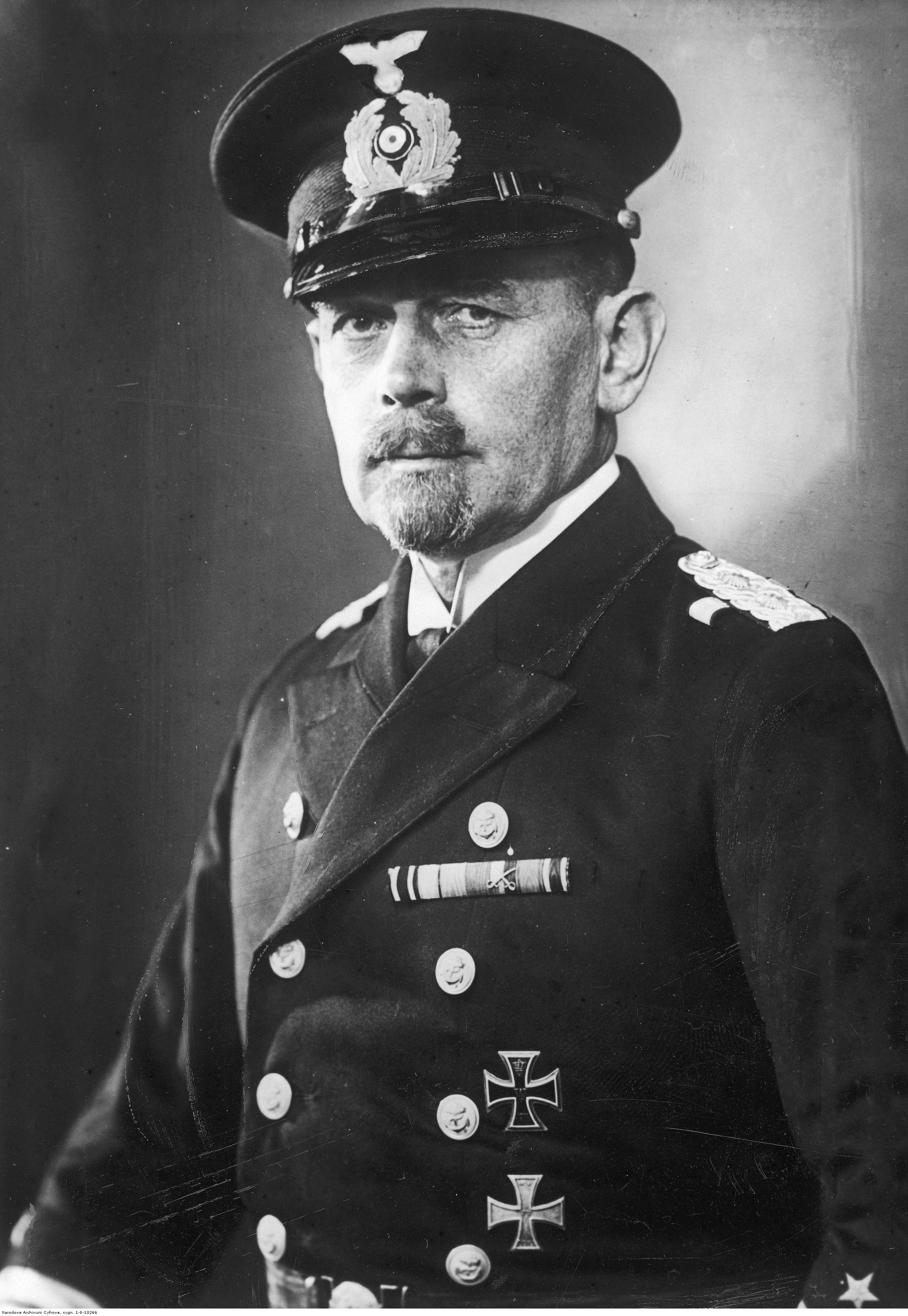
Konteradmiral

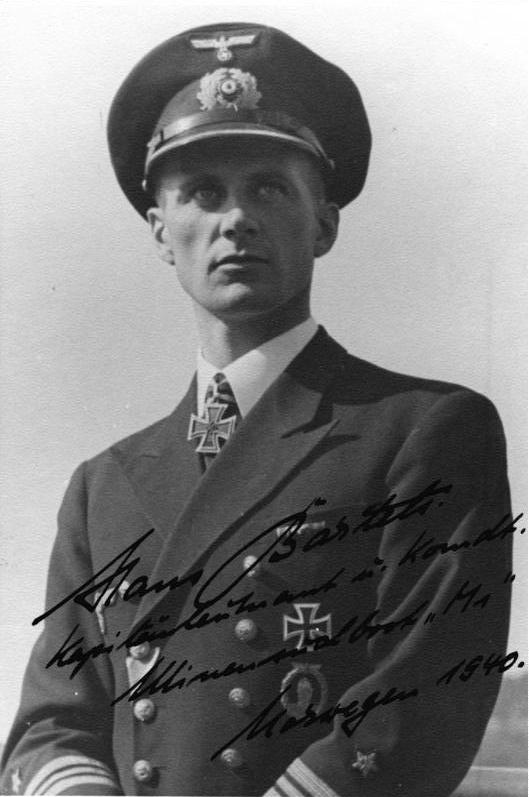
Kapitänleutnant

Chief petty officers wore a uniform very similar to the officer jacket, but with shoulder epaulets instead of sleeve stripes to denote rank. The service uniform for an enlisted sailor consisted of a jacket, a pair of trousers, a white and a blue shirt, matching collars edged with three stripes, a silk neckerchief, grey gloves and a cap with two ribbons. The enlisted cap was emblazoned with the script "Kriegsmarine". The enlisted "dress service uniform" was worn with an open coat, buttoned in the center, with white dress shirt and embroidered gold sleeve buttons. The undress version consisted of a double breasted coat, worn over a dark shirt and black tie, with the coat displaying dark blue collar tabs.

Chief petty officer service uniforms

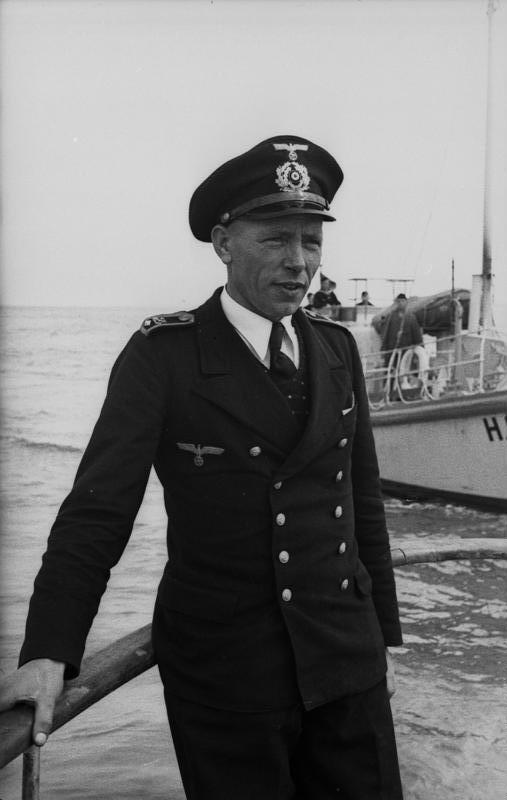
Steuermann

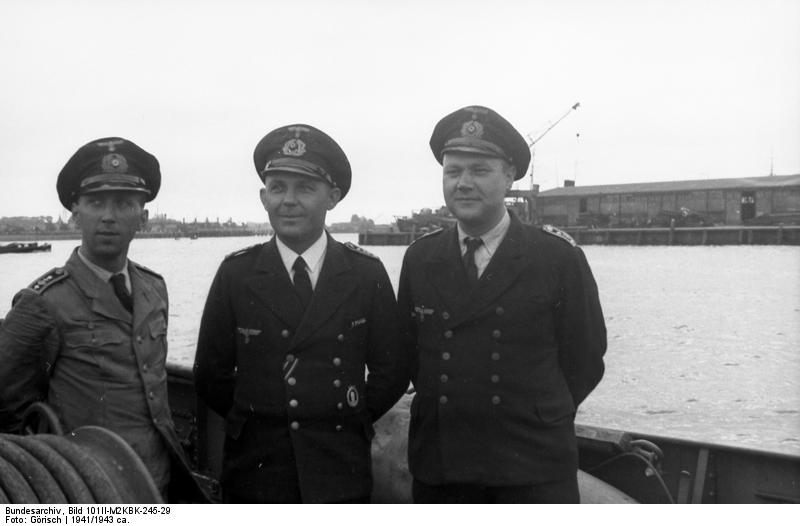
Obermaschinist (Group)

Sailor service uniforms

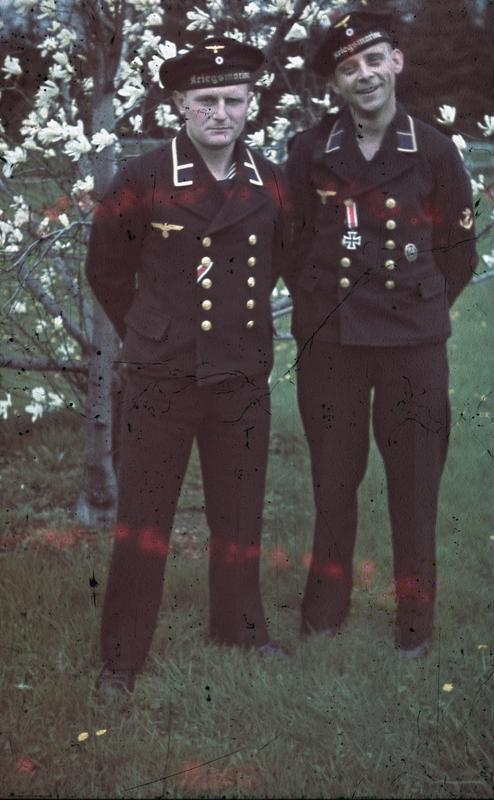
Obermaat

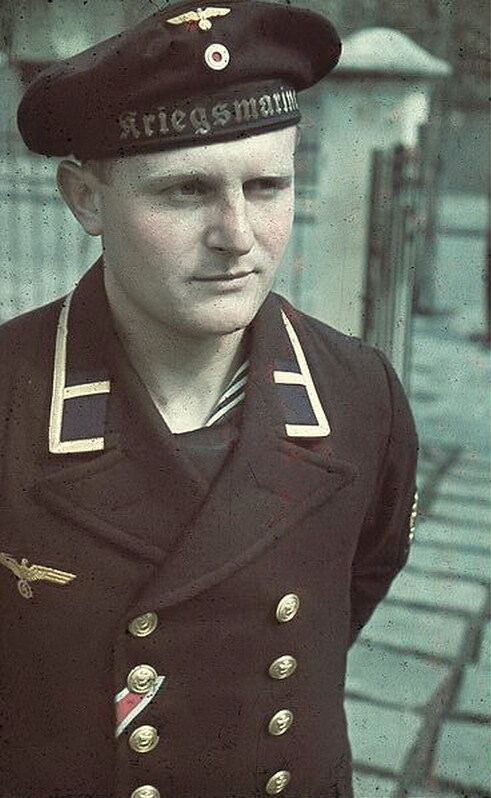
Maat

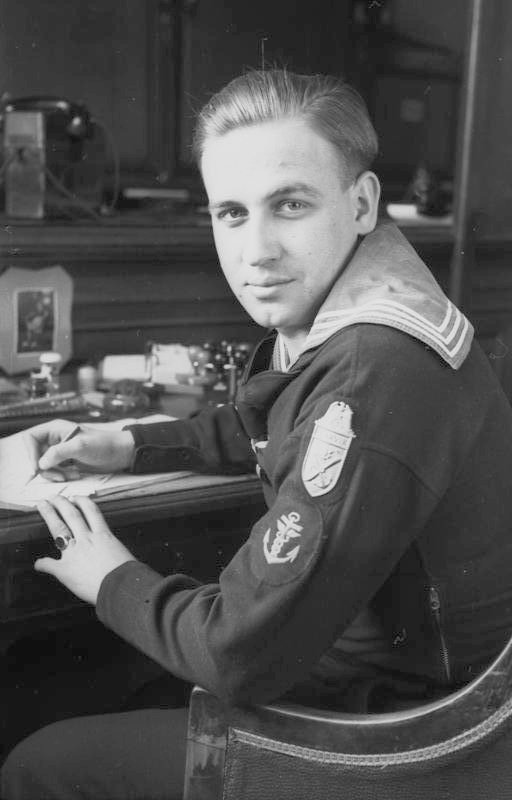
Verwaltungsmatrose

=== Service Duty uniforms ===
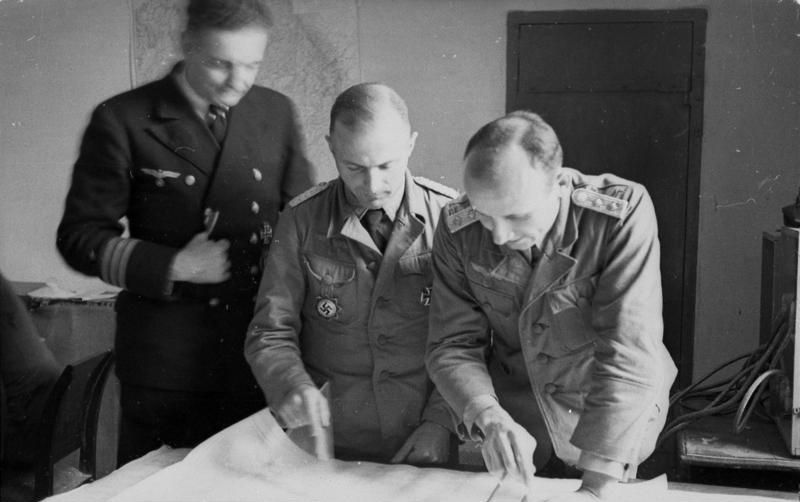
Two Kriegsmarine officers wearing the khaki tropical uniform variant

For standard everyday wear on-board naval vessels, enlisted sailors wore a frock coat with limited medals and badges (typically only war badges and high combat awards) as well as a simple system of collar tabs to denote between regular seaman and petty officers (Maat). In heavy weather, a thick overcoat was also worn.

The Kriegsmarine further maintained a summer uniform known as the Tropen- und Sommeranzug (Tropical and Summer Dress) designed for use in hot climates. The uniform classification was divided into tropical khakis, which the Monsoon Group wore this as their standard uniform while deployed to bases in Southeast Asia, and the "summer white variant" which consisted of a white service jacket for officers (with rank epaulets but no rank stripes), a similar white jacket with shoulder straps for chiefs, as well as a "pull over" white enlisted jumper for sailors and petty officers.

Kriegsmarine personnel permanently assigned to shore stations, to include coastal artillery, wore a grey green uniform in the same style as the German Army, but with gold instead of silver buttons. The uniform was worn with closed collar with collar tabs and shoulder rank epaulets. Officers wore standard epaulets while chiefs wore shoulder straps with rank pips and a centered anchor crest. Enlisted seaman wore dark green chevrons and a bare shoulder strap while petty officers wore a rank strap similar to that of an army Unteroffizier.

Working sailor uniforms

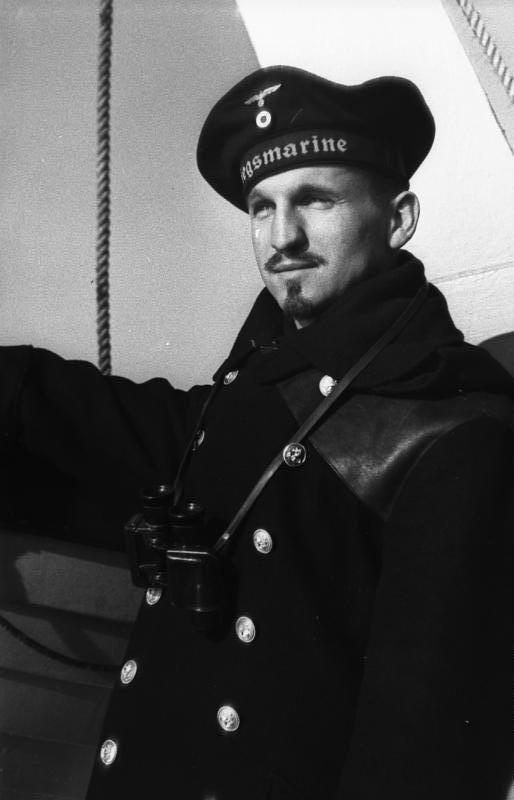
Matrose

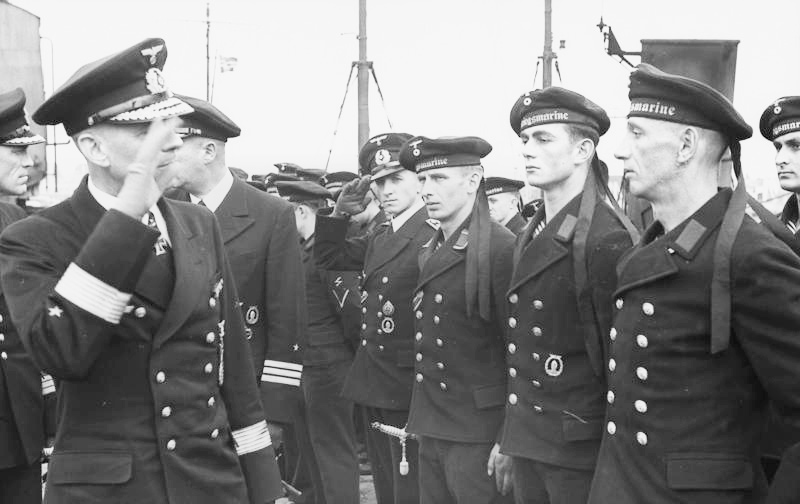
Matrose und Maat

Navy shore uniforms

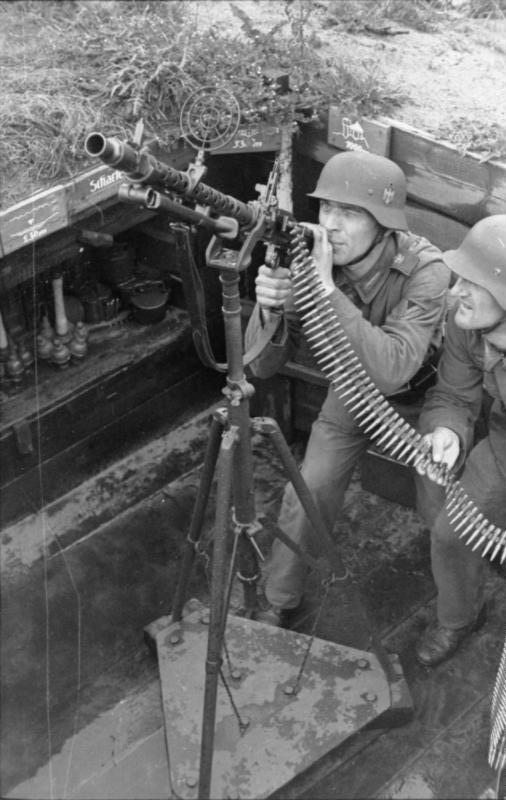
Coastal gunner

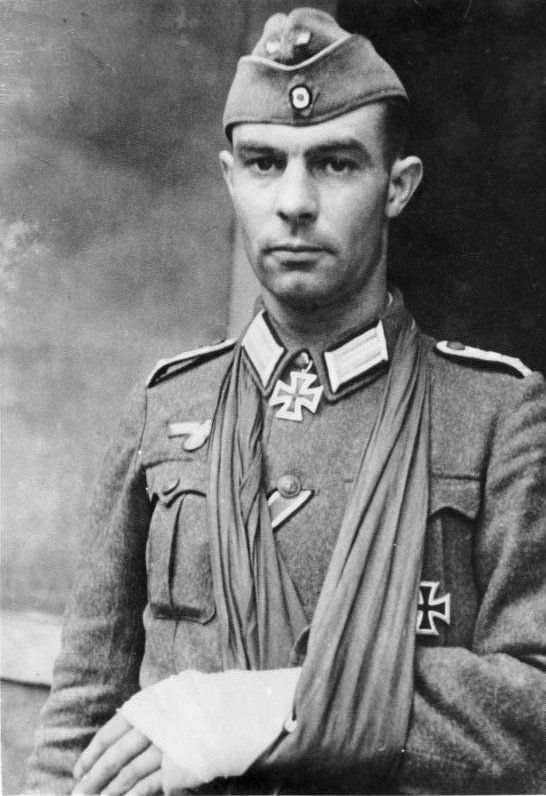
Coastal Artillery officer

Special uniforms

Special uniform variants included Kriegsmarine sportswear (Sportanzug) which consisted of running shorts with a white T-shirt, often worn with black shoes. Engineering personnel on-board surface ships were further issued with a boilersuit devoid of any insignia except for a swastika eagle emblem and worn with a blue garrison cap. A special variant, known as "sentry dress", was essentially a standard enlisted uniform worn with an ammunition belt while on armed sentry duty. Personnel assigned to deck guns or anti-aircraft crews also were issued flak helmets, sometimes with vests and flash hoods, depending upon the caliber of the manned guns.

=== Submarine uniforms ===
Due to the arduous nature of U-boat duty, uniforms varied greatly depending upon the actions and activity of the service member. All submarine personnel were required to maintain standard Navy uniforms, with the undress service uniform being the most commonly worn when on shore. Upon departure and return to base, especially when the submarine was visible to onlookers, officers would wear a modified version of the service uniform to consist of the blue service coat along with grey all weather over-trousers. Commanders who had earned the Knight's Cross would often wear tin copies for the ceremonial entrance and exit to port. All medals, ribbons, and badges were removed once fully underway at sea.

The standard "patrol uniform" consisted of a grey-brown denim jacket for officers and chiefs while a grey all weather smock coat was worn by enlisted personnel. Some of the original U-boat uniforms had been issued from British stocks abandoned at Dunkirk. U-boat personnel were also issued a variety of weather clothing to include fleece lined footwear and all weather over-trousers of brown or grey leather.

As an unwritten rule, the captain of any submarine wore a white peaked cap in contrast to officers and chiefs who wore blue service caps. Lookouts wore oilskins and sou'westers on duty while sailors in the control center and on deck were required to wear garrison covers. Dress restrictions for engineering and torpedo man personnel, who often worked in cramped and humid conditions, were far more lax and most in these duties wore comfortable civilian clothes. An unofficial modicum for the ship's Chief engineer was the "checkered shirt" which was a comfortable working shirt often worn with pants and suspenders.

Submarine duty uniforms

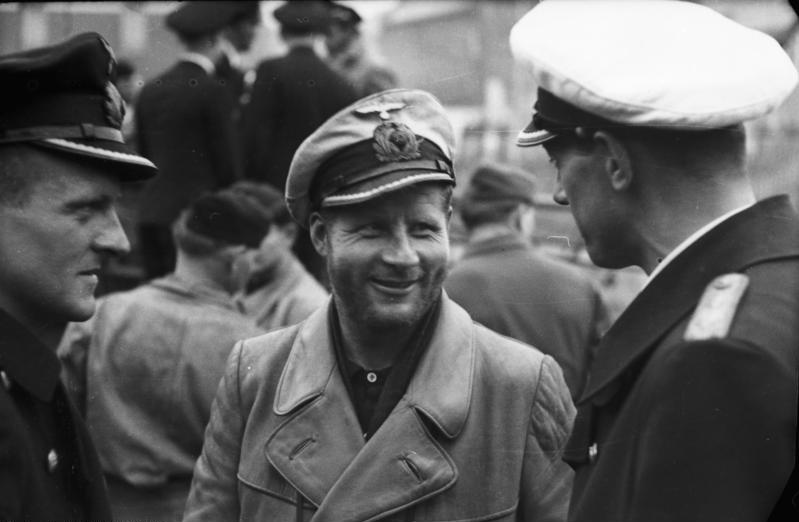
U-boat smock coat

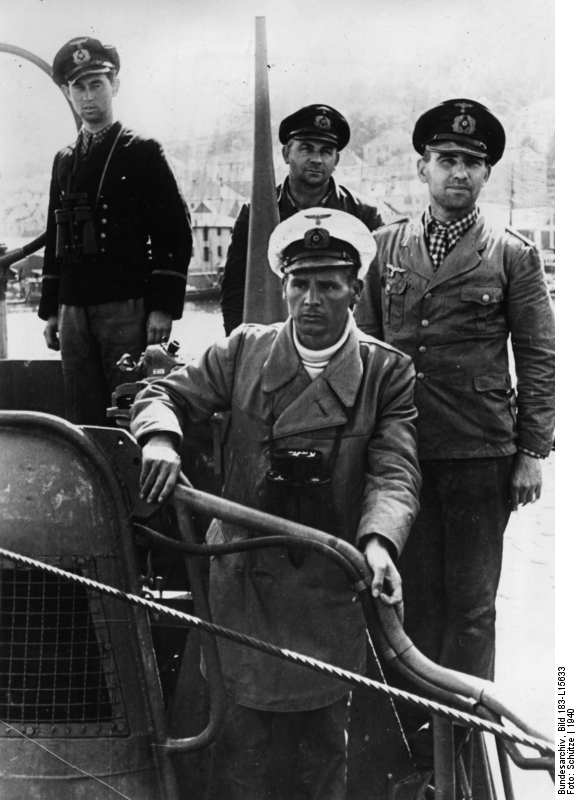
U-boat chief engineer (checkered shirt)

== Rank insignia ==
=== Flag officer ranks ===
Admiral ranks
Title	Großadmiral	Generaladmiral	Admiral	Vizeadmiral	Konteradmiral
Epaulette					
Sleeve lace					
Command flag					
Contemporary German Army equivalent	Generalfeldmarschall	Generaloberst	General der Waffengattung	Generalleutnant	Generalmajor
Contemporary United States Navy equivalent	Fleet Admiral	Admiral	Vice admiral	Rear Admiral	Commodore

=== Officer ranks ===
Line officers
Title	Kommodore	Kapitän zur See	Fregattenkapitän	Korvettenkapitän	Kapitänleutnant	Oberleutnant zur See	Leutnant zur See
Epaulette							
Sleeve lace							
Contemporary German Army equivalent	Oberst		Oberstleutnant	Major	Hauptmann	Oberleutnant	Leutnant
Contemporary United States Navy equivalent	Commodore	Captain	Commander	Lieutenant Commander	Lieutenant	Lieutenant (Junior Grade)	Ensign

=== Officer candidate ranks ===
Officer candidate ranks
Title	Oberfähnrich zur See	Fähnrich zur See	Seekadett	Offiziersanwärter
Epaulette			No shoulder board	
Sleeve lace				
Contemporary German Army equivalent				
Contemporary United States Navy equivalent	Passed Midshipman	Midshipman	Cadet	Officer Candidate

=== Warrant officer and chief petty officer ranks ===
Within the rank group of Unteroffiziere mit Portepee there were two career paths; one leading to Oberfeldwebel (Warrant officer), and one leading to Stabsfeldwebel (Chief petty officer). The first path was based on the Imperial Navy Deckoffizier, Warrant officers, and lead straight from Maat (Petty officer, third class) to Oberfeldwebel (Warrant officer). The second led from Maat (Petty officer, third class), to Obermaat (Petty officer, second class), to Feldwebel (Petty officer, first class), and finally to Stabsfeldwebel (Chief petty officer), for those allowed to remain in service after the end of the twelve years service obligation.

The generic rank title was Feldwebel, the specific rank titles for each branch is specified below.

Feldwebel (also: Unteroffiziere mit Portepee)
Epaulette				
Epaulette	Stabsoberfeldwebel (Note: Thirteen to fifteen years in service required for advancement to this rank from Oberfeldwebel.)	Oberfeldwebel (Note: Selective promotion directly from Maat to this rank.)	Stabsfeldwebel (F) (Note: Special rank for Feldwebel with over twelve years in service. Not in line of promotion to Oberfeldwebel.)	Feldwebel (Note: Promotion from Obermaat to this rank. In line of promotion to Stabsfeldwebel, but not to Oberfeldwebel.)
Contemporary German Army equivalent	Stabsfeldwebel	Oberfeldwebel		Feldwebel
Contemporary United States Navy equivalent	Chief Warrant Officer	Warrant Officer	Chief Petty Officer	Petty Officer 1st Class

Rank titles of Warrant and Chief Petty Officers
Generic Rank	Feldwebel	Stabsfeldwebel (F)	Oberfeldwebel	Stabsoberfeldwebel
Aircraft Warning	Flugmeldefeldwebel	Flugmeldestabsfeldwebel (F)	Flugmeldeoberfeldwebel	Flugmeldestabsoberfeldwebel
Ammunition Technician	Feuerwerker	Stabsfeuerwerker (F)	Oberfeuerwerker	Stabsoberfeuerwerker
Boatswain	Bootsmann	Stabsbootsmann (F)	Oberbootsmann	Stabsoberbootsmann
Carpenter	Zimmermann	Stabszimmermann (F)	Oberzimmermann	Stabsoberzimmermann
Commissary Clerk	Verwaltungsfeldwebel	Verwaltungsstabsfeldwebel (F)	Verwaltungsoberfeldwebel	Verwaltungsstabsoberfeldwebel
Hydrography	Vermessungssteuermann	Stabsvermessungssteuermann (F)	Obervermessungssteuermann	Stabsobervermessungssteuermann
Machinist	Maschinist	Stabsmaschinist (F)	Obermaschinist	Stabsobermaschinist
Mechanician	Mechaniker	Stabsmechaniker (F)	Obermechaniker	Stabsobermechaniker
Motor Transport	Kraftfahrfeldwebel	Kraftfahrstabsfeldwebel (F)	Kraftfahroberfeldwebel	Kraftfahrstabsoberfeldwebel
Music	Musikfeldwebel	Musikstabsfeldwebel (F)	Musikoberfeldwebel	Musikstabsoberfeldwebel
Naval Artillery	Marineartilleriefeldwebel	Marineartilleriestabsfeldwebel (F)	Marineartillerieoberfeldwebel	Marineartilleriestabsoberfeldwebel
Navigation	Steuermann	Stabssteuermann (F)	Obersteuermann	Stabsobersteuermann
Pharmacist	Sanitätsfeldwebel	Sanitätsstabsfeldwebel (F)	Sanitätsoberfeldwebel	Sanitätsstabsoberfeldwebel
Radio	Funkmeister	Stabsfunkmeister (F)	Oberfunkmeister	Stabsoberfunkmeister
Personnel Replacement System	Feldwebel	Stabsfeldwebel (F)	Oberfeldwebel	Stabsoberfeldwebel
Ship's Clerk	Schreiberfeldwebel	Schreiberstabsfeldwebel (F)	Schreiberoberfeldwebel	Schreiberstabsoberfeldwebel
Signals	Signalmeister	Stabsignalmeister (F)	Obersignalmeister	Stabsobersignalmeister
Telephone	Fernsprechmeister	Stabsfernsprechmeister (F)	Oberfernsprechmeister	Stabsoberfernsprechmeister
Teleprinter	Fernschreibmeister	Stabsfernschreibmeister (F)	Oberoberfernschreibmeister	Stabsoberfernschreibmeister

=== Petty officer ranks ===
Maate (Unteroffiziere ohne Portepee)
Title	Obermaat	Maat
Epaulette (Shore troops only)		
Collar tab		
Sleeve insignia (Bootsmann ratings shown)		
Sleeve insignia (Bootsmann ratings shown)	Oberbootsmannmaat	Bootsmannmaat
Contemporary German Army equivalent	Unterfeldwebel	Unteroffizier
Contemporary United States Navy equivalent	Petty officer, second class	Petty officer, third class

Petty officers also wore a large rating badge on their left sleeve, beneath which were displayed authorized trade badges. Shore uniforms were worn with a Germany Army style sergeant's shoulder boards and golden collar trim.

=== Seamen ranks ===
Mannschaften (English: Seamen ranks)
Title	Oberstabsgefreiter (Note: Special rank for seamen enlisted before 31 March 1934 with over eight years time-in-service. Not in line of promotion to Maat.)	Stabsgefreiter (Note: Special rank for seamen enlisted before 31 March 1934 with over six years time-in-service. Not in line of promotion to Maat.)	Hauptgefreiter (Note: Seaman, first class equivalent with over 4 ½ years in service. Not in line of promotion to Maat.)	Obergefreiter	Gefreiter	Matrose	
Epaulette (Shore troops only)							
Collar tab							
Sleeve chevron							
Contemporary German Army equivalent	None	None	Stabsgefreiter	Obergefreiter	Gefreiter	Oberschütze	Soldat
Contemporary United States Navy equivalent	None		Seaman 1st class	Seaman 2nd class	Seaman 3rd class	Apprentice seaman	

Enlisted sailors wore a rating badge above their rank chevrons while trade badges were displayed below. Enlisted chevrons on the shore uniform were gold colored with a dark green background. Unrated seamen were called Matrose. Rated seamen had a rank title depending on the rating. Rated deck branch seamen were called Matrosengefreiter. Rated carpenters were called Zimmermansgefreiter, rated Engine room seamen were called Maschinengefreiter etc.

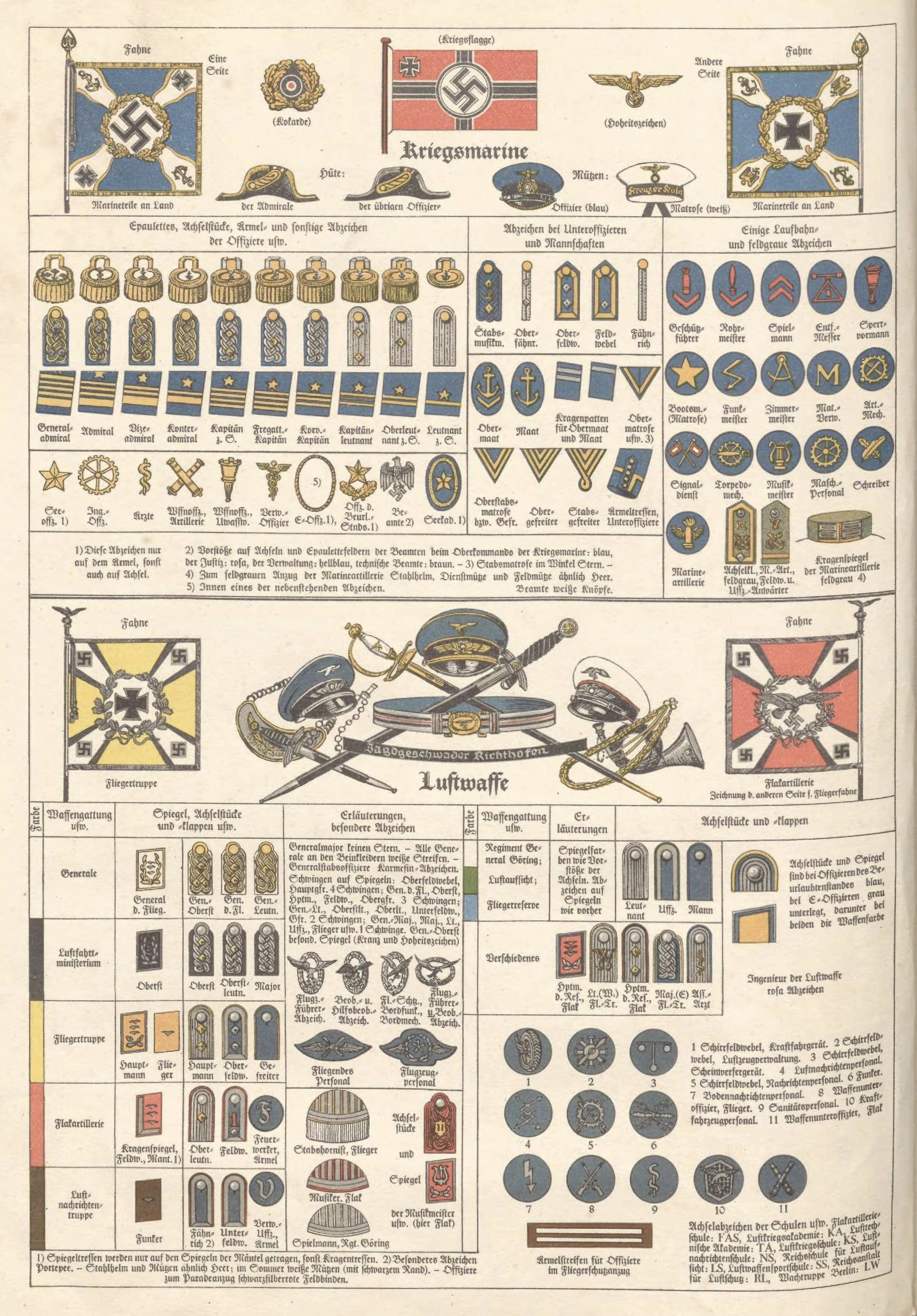
Flags, uniforms and insignia of the Kriegsmarine and Luftwaffe c. 1936.

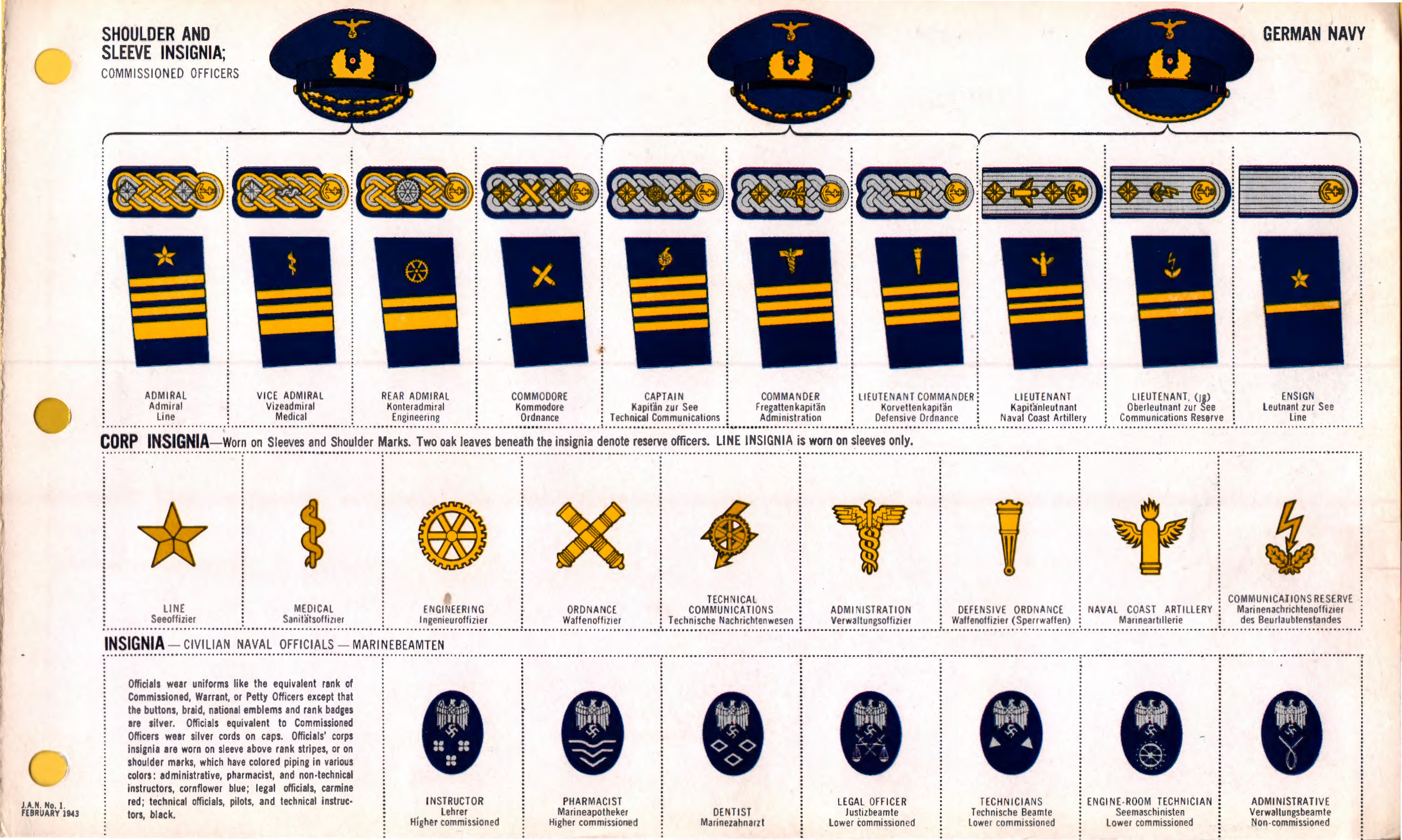
Kriegsmarine rank insignia in an allied uniform guide 1943.

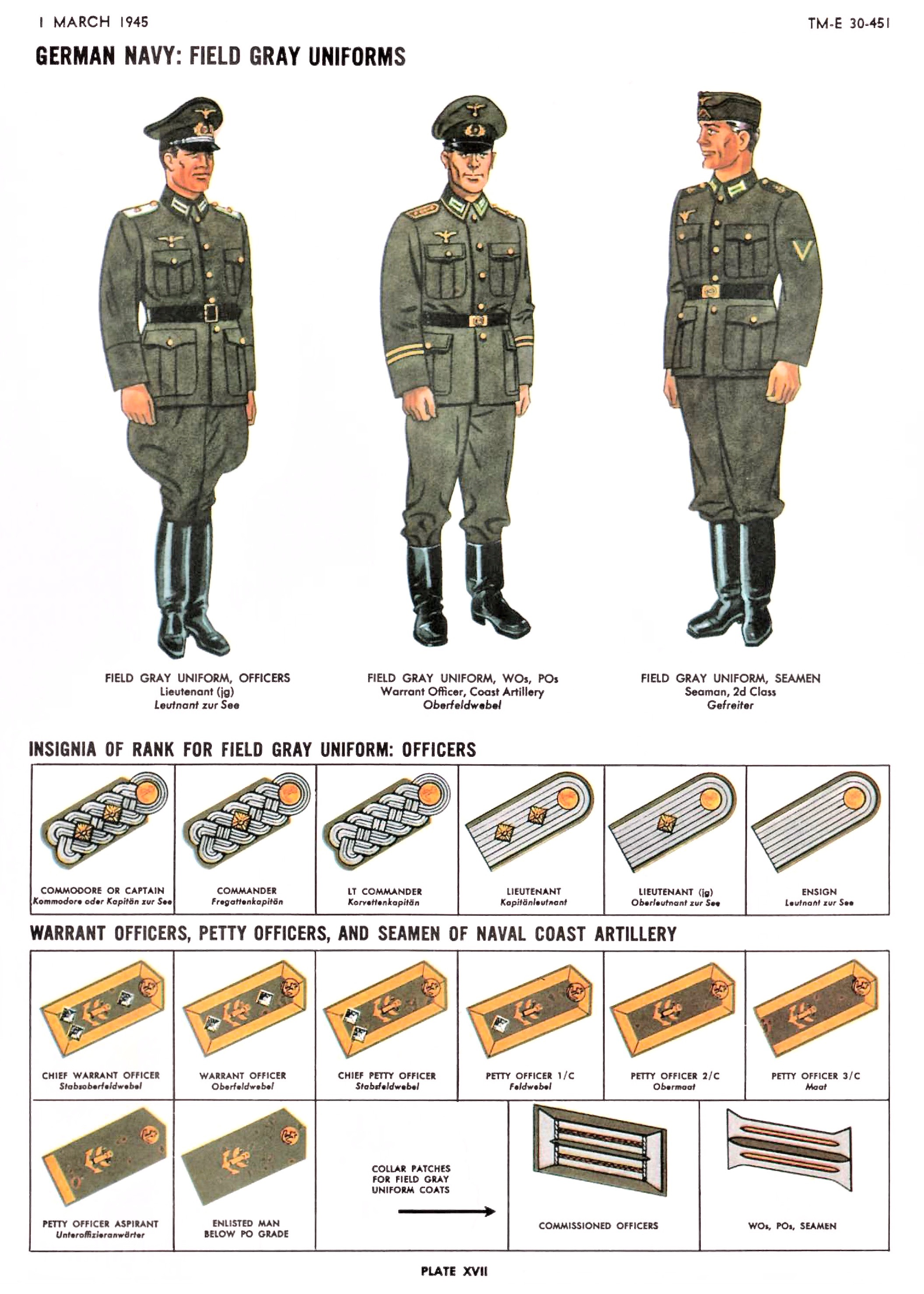
Kriegsmarine rank insignia for field gray uniform (naval, coastal artillery) c. 1945.

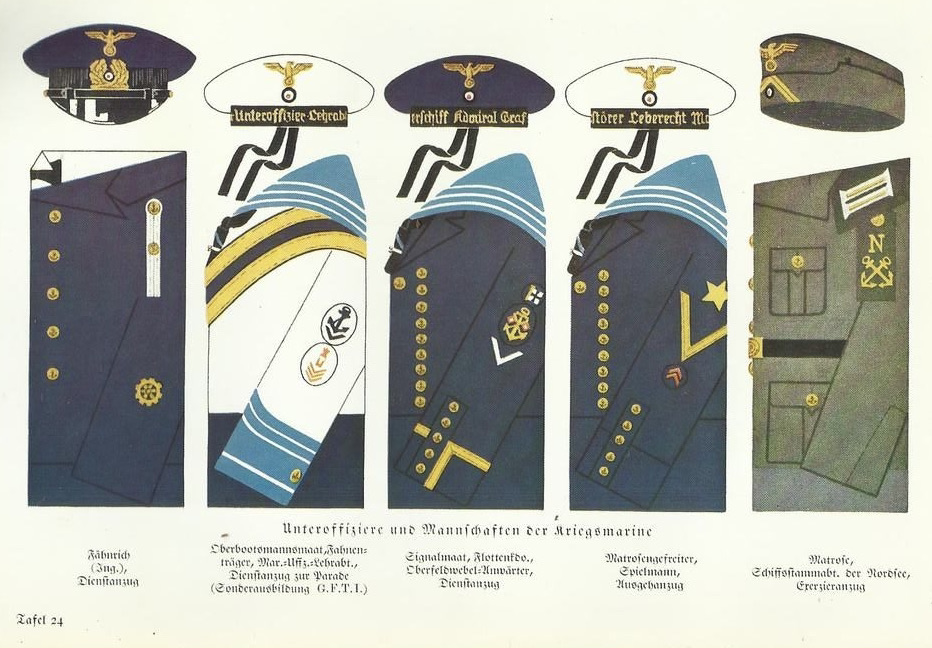
Uniforms of midshipmen, petty officers and seamen, 1939.

=== Changes in rank titles and chevrons for seamen, 1933-1940 ===
Title 1933 (Note: Title and rank insignia retained until 1937 for seamen enlisted before 31 March 1934.)	Stabsgefreiter	Obergefreiter	n/a	Gefreiter	Obermatrose
Sleeve chevron 1933			n/a		
Title 1935 (Note: New title and rank insignia for seamen enlisted after 31 March 1934.)	n/a	n/a	Oberstabsmatrose	Stabsmatrose	Obermatrose
Sleeve chevron 1935	n/a	n/a			
Title 1937	Stabsgefreiter (Note: For seamen enlisted before 31 March 1934)	Obergefreiter (Note: For seamen enlisted before 31 March 1934, with 6 years time-in-service.)	Oberstabsmatrose	Stabsmatrose	Obermatrose
Title 1938	Stabsgefreiter alter Art	Obergefreiter alter Art	Hauptgefreiter	Obergefreiter	Gefreiter
Title 1940	Oberstabsgefreiter	Stabsgefreiter	Hauptgefreiter	Obergefreiter	Gefreiter
Sleeve chevron 1937					

== Kriegsmarine rates ==
The Kriegsmarine rating system was designed to indicate the particular career specialty of enlisted sailors, petty officers, and chief petty officers. Officers did not use rates, but were divided between staff and line officers. Line officers wore a large gold star above their sleeve stripe insignia while staff officers wore a career specific emblem in place of the star.

The rating system had been developed during the 19th century by the Imperial German Navy and had carried over into the Reichsmarine and Kriegsmarine. German naval rates were differentiated between career fields in deck, engineering, weapons systems, medical rates, and technical specialties. The original rates of the Kriegsmarine, upon the service's creation from the Reichsmarine in 1935, were Boatswain, Sergeant, Signalman, Helmsman, Carpenter, Firework Maker, Gunner, Engineer, Musician, Machine Operator, and Radioman. By 1939, the rates of Sergeant and Firework Maker had been discontinued with several additional wartime rates added. By the end of the Second World War, there were nineteen established ratings in the German navy as well as a general "non-rated" category for unrated naval personnel.

Rating insignia of the Kriegsmarine
Rate	Equivalent	Department	Sailor badge	Petty Officer badge	Warrant Officer strap
Bootsmann	Boatswain	Deck	Matrosengefreite		Oberbootsmann
Steuermann	Navigator	Deck	No enlisted		Obersteuermann
Vermessungssteuermann	Hydrographic Navigator	Deck	No enlisted		Obervermessungssteuermann
Signalgast	Signalman	Deck	Signalgefreite		Obersignalmeister
Maschinist (Note: Divided into sub-rates for electrical and diesel engines)	Machinist	Engineering	Maschinengefreite		Obermaschinist
Zimmermann	Carpenter	Engineering	Zimmermangefreite		
Torpedmechaniker	Torpedo Mechanic	Weapons (Note: Department normally divided into torpedo, deck gun, and flak gun sections)	Mechanikergefreiter		Obermechaniker
Marineartillerist	Coastal Artilleryman	Weapons	Marineartilleriegefreite		
Sperrwaffenmechaniker	Mineman	Weapons	Mechanikergefreite		
Feuerwerker	Armorer	Weapons	Feuerwerkergefreite		
Funker	Radioman	Communications (Note: Operated both the ship's radio as well as all hydrophone and radar gear)	Funkgefreite		
Fernschreiber	Telex operator	Communications	Fernschreibergefreite		
Flugmelder	Naval observer	Special services	Flugmeldegefreite		
Sanitäter	Medic	General services	Sanitätsgefreite		Sanitätsoberfeldwebel
Verwaltungsschreiber	Yeoman	General services	Verwaltungsschreibergefreite		
Schreiber	Clerk	General services	Schreibergefreite		
Kraftfahrer	Driver	General services	Kraftfahrgefreite		
Musiker	Musician	General services	Musikergefreite		
Allgemeine Marinedienst	Non-rated	General services	No badge Gefreite		Oberfeldwebel

A sailor enlisting into the German Navy was first simply designated as "unrated" and referred to as a Matrose. After basic training, the sailor would be assigned a rate; if simply completing a single enlistment with no promise or requirement for technical training, the sailor would be rated as a deck seaman and begin wearing a small gold star on their upper left shoulder. Once advanced to the "sailor corporal" ranks, the sailor would begin wearing a chevron underneath the rating star. When addressing the sailor verbally, their rate was not mentioned and the sailor typically referred to by the generic term Matrose or Matrosengefreiter. In written correspondence, the rate would sometimes be written after the rank, i.e. Matrose (Bootsmann) or Matrosenobergefreiter (Machinist).

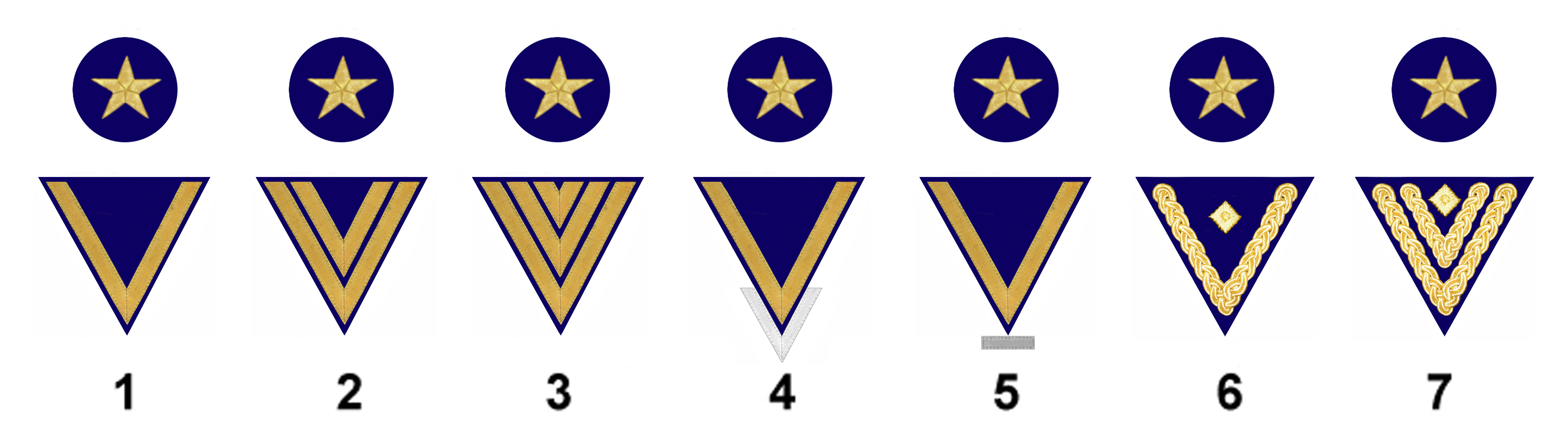
The rating path of a German seaman in the rate of boatswain (Bootsmann)

Upon advancing to the rank of Petty Officer (Maat), a sailor would be referred to by their rate and rank (i.e. Steuermannmaat). Rank was denoted by a collar tab while rate was displayed as a larger patch replacing the former sailor sleeve chevron and rating badge. A special petty officer rating insignia existed for those Maat who were unrated; a rare occurrence but sometimes happening with those in highly specific career fields who had enlisted directly as a petty officer or who had never held an enlisted rate as a seaman.

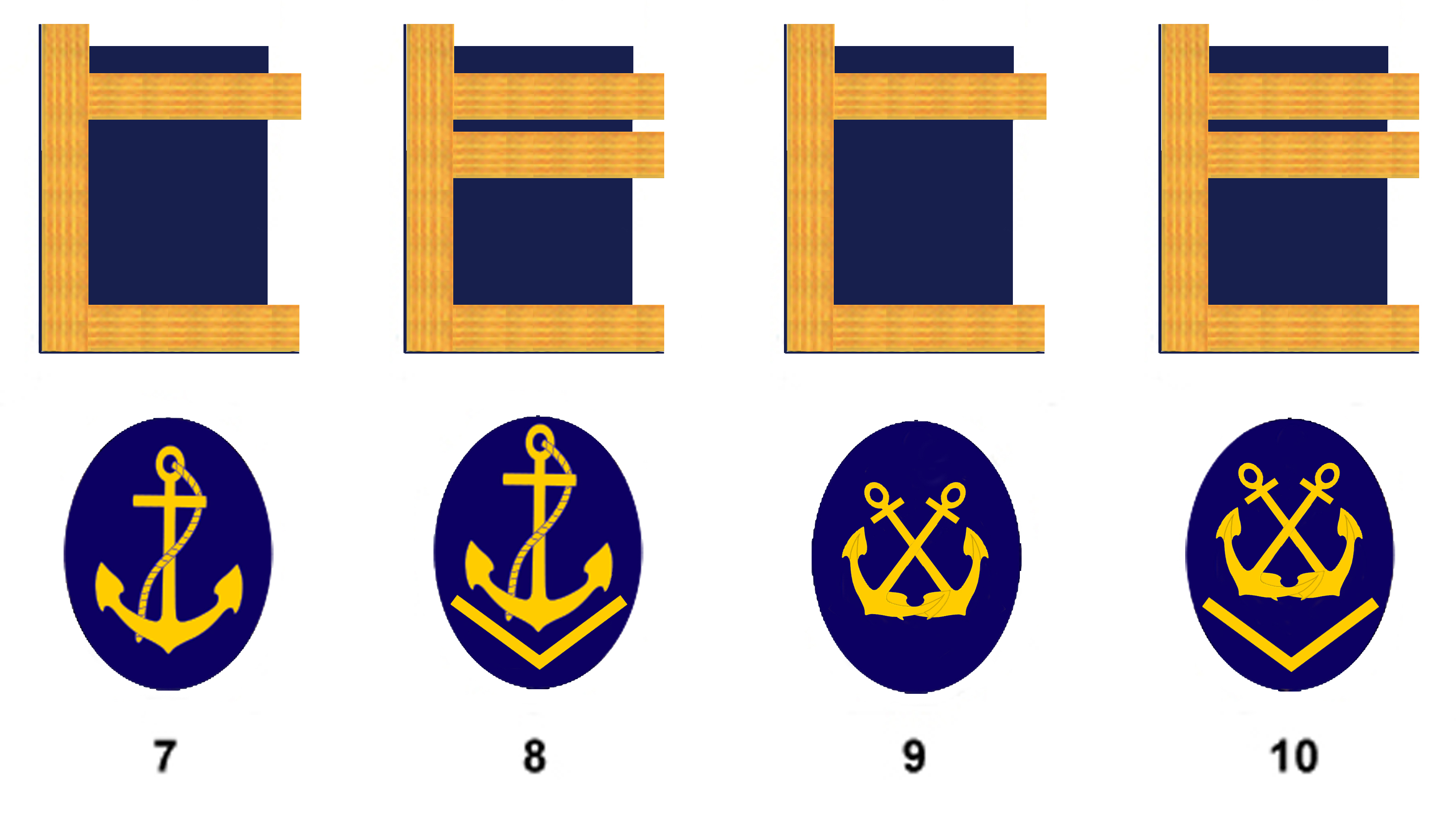
Petty officer rating badges of a boatswain and coxswain (Maat and Obermaat)

Chief petty officers were addressed solely by their rate and wore rating insignia centered on their shoulder straps. The rating crest was the same used by seaman, except for the Bootsmann rate whose chiefs wore a fouled anchor in comparison to the rating star of the deck seaman. Unrated chief petty officers wore a standard anchor insignia on their shoulder boards and were referred to solely by their rank (Matrosenfeldwebel), often shortened to simply Feldwebel.

=== Trade badges ===
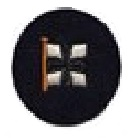
Signalman headquarters badge

To denote additional qualifications within a particular rate, the Kriegsmarine issued a number of "trade badges" which were worn as red on blue patches beneath either the seaman's rank chevron or petty officer's badge. Trade badges were not worn or displayed by either officers or chiefs.

Kriegsmarine uniform chart displaying various trade badges

Qualification trade insignia was issued in up to four classes, beginning with a basic badge followed by apprentice, journeyman, and master. All trade badges above basic were denoted by chevrons on the trade patch; some trade patches were authorized up to all three chevrons while others were eligible for only one or two. One of the more common engineering trade badges was that of Handwerker (damage controlman) which appeared as a red diver's helmet and was issued up to the master qualification level.

A special insignia also existed for signalman who were posted to a naval headquarters. The insignia appeared as a small patch showing a German Imperial Navy signal flag and was worn above the sailor's signalman's rating badge.

== Awards and decorations ==
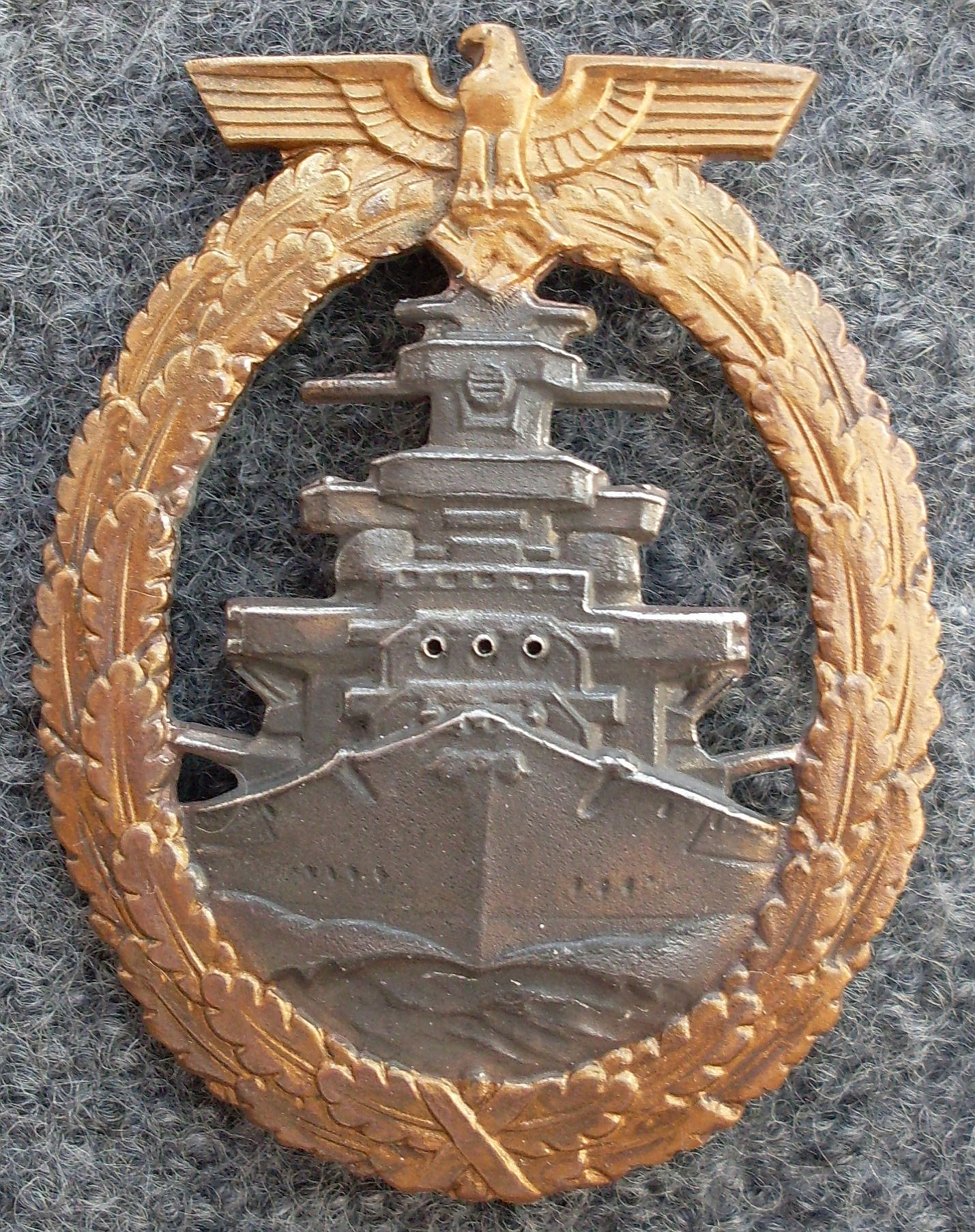
German High Seas Fleet Badge

Members of the Kriegsmarine were eligible for all Third Reich military awards as well as certain war badges and medals specific to the Kriegsmarine. The Knights Cross of the Iron Cross was a standard award for highly successful U-boat commanders. Political decorations were generally prohibited for display on military uniforms, with the exception of the Golden Party Badge. Kriegsmarine personnel could also earn both the SA Sports and German National Sports Badges as well as the Equestrian Badge.
