= Obermaat =

- shoulder board / cuff title / mounting loop
- Country: Germany
- Service branch: German Navy
- Abbreviation: OMaat
- Rank: Unteroffiziere ohne Portepee grade
- NATO rank code: OR-5
- Formation: 1955
- Next higher rank: Bootsmann
- Next lower rank: Maat
- Equivalent ranks: Stabsunteroffizier

Obermaat is a military rank of the Bundeswehr and earlier other German-speaking armed forces.

== Bundeswehr ==
Obermaat (OMaat or in lists OMT) is a rank of the German Navy. It belongs to the particular rank group NCO's without portepee.

According to the salary class it is equivalent to the Stabsunteroffizier of Heer or Luftwaffe. It is grouped as OR5 in NATO, equivalent to Petty officer, second class, Sergeant, or Staff Sergeant in Anglophone armed forces.

In navy context NCOs of this rank were formally addressed as Herr/ Frau Obermaat also informally / short Obermaat. The sequence of ranks (top-down approach) in that particular group is as follows:
Unteroffizier ohne Portepee

- OR-5: Obermaat / (Heer/ Luftwaffe) Stabsunteroffizier
- OR-5: Seekadett / Fahnenjunker
- OR-5: Maat / Unteroffizier

The abbreviation "OR" stands for "Other Ranks / fr: sous-officiers et militaires du rang / ru:другие ранги, кроме офицеров"!

Preceded by junior Rank; Maat	(German NCO rank); Obermaat	Succeeded by senior Rank; Bootsmann

== Obermaat Nazi-Kriegsmarine until 1945 ==
Maate (Unteroffiziere ohne Portepee)
Title	Obermaat	
Collar tab		
Sleeve insignia		
Sleeve insignia	Obersteuermannmaat	Oberbootsmannmaat
Shoulder strap		N/A
Wehrmacht equivalent	Unterfeldwebel	

junior rank Maat	(Kriegsmarine ranks); Obermaat	senior rank Bootsmann

== See also ==
- Ranks of the German Bundeswehr
- Rank insignia of the German Bundeswehr
- Ranks and insignia of NATO navies enlisted

== Bibliography ==
- Mallmann Showell, Jak P. (2002) [1999]. German Navy Handbook 1939–1945. Stroud, UK: Sutton Publishing. ISBN 0-7509-3205-8.
