= Seekadett =

Military rank of the German Navy

- shoulder board / cuff title / mounting loop
- Country: Germany
- Service branch: German Navy
- Abbreviation: SKad
- Rank group: Non-commissioned officers
- Rank: German NCO rank
- NATO rank code: OR-5
- Formation: 1966
- Next higher rank: Obermaat
- Next lower rank: Oberstabsgefreiter
- Equivalent ranks: Fähnrich

Seekadett (short SKad or SK; transl. Naval (officer) cadet, lit. 'sea cadet') is a military rank of the Bundeswehr and of former German-speaking naval forces.

The legal basis for the German Navy is the Presidential order of the Federal president (German: Bundespräsident) on rank insignia and uniforms of soldiers.

== Rank ==
Seekadett is the entrance rank to the Officer Aspirant (OA – German: Offizieranwärter) career. By the salary class, it is equivalent to the Unteroffizier ohne Portepee ranks Maat (rank) (Navy) and Unteroffizier of Heer or Luftwaffe.

It is also grouped as OR-5 in NATO, equivalent to technical sergeant, sergeant or petty officer second class in the US armed forces.

In navy context NCOs of this rank were formally addressed as Herr/ Frau Seekadett also informally / short Seekadett.

The name to the rank-equivalent persons in uniform of Heer or Luftwaffe are Fahnenjunker. Pertaining authority of command, promotion, and payment level, Seekadett compares with Fahnenjunker as well.

The sequence of ranks (top-down approach) in that particular group is as follows:
Unteroffizier ohne Portepee

- OR-5a: Obermaat / Heer and Luftwaffe Stabsunteroffizier
- OR-5b: Seekadett / Fahnenjunker
- OR-5c: Maat / Unteroffizier

junior Rank; Oberstabsgefreiter	Seekadett	senior Rank; Obermaat
junior Rank; Oberstabsgefreiter	Bootsmann	senior Rank; Obermaat

== Rank insignia ==
Matrose OA (OR/1) / with nautical star

An officer candidate's career is indicated by the enlisted rank with the golden nautical star on the shoulder strap and sleeve in the Deutsche Marine, and a thin silver cord on the shoulder strap in Heer and Luftwaffe.

The rank insignia of Seekadett consist of sleeve badge and shoulder straps. Sleeve insignia are on upper arms, and form two open opposite faced angles, showing (by points) upwards and downwards. The shoulder straps are bordered by a golden braid that is open to the sleeve seam.

Already below the lowest officer designated rank "Seekadett" any military person, assigned to an officer career, has to wear additionally to the particular rank the two capital letters “OA”, indicating to the “Officer Aspirant” career. The "nautical star" symbolises the "OA" career.

from 1956	German Navy
Distinction	Oberfähnrich (Senior cadet sergeant)	Fähnrich (Cadet sergeant)	Fahnenjunker (Officer cadet senior grade)	Oberfähnrich (Senior aviation cadet)	Fähnrich (Aviation cadet)	Fahnenjunker (Officer cadet senior grade)	Oberfähnrich zur See (Senior midshipman)	Fähnrich zur See (Midshipman)	Seekadett (Naval cadet)
Rangcode	(OR-7)	(OR-6)	(OR-5)	(OR-7)	(OR-6)	(OR-5)	(OR-7)	(OR-6)	(OR-5)
NATO	Cadet sergeant	Midshipman
USAF	Aviation cadet auch Warrant Officer
RAF	Acting pilot officer

== Training and career ==
Officer cadets in the Deutsche Marine begin their training at the Naval Academy Mürwik (German: Marineschule Mürwik) in Flensburg-Mürwik holding enlisted ranks with the qualifier officer candidate (German: Offizieranwärter), abbreviated as OA. After about a year, they are promoted to Seekadetten, equivalent to the non-commissioned officer (NCO) rank Mate (German: Maat), and move to the University of the German Federal Armed Forces. About nine months later, they are promoted to Fähnrich zur See rank, equivalent to the NCO rank Boatswain (German: Bootsmann). After 30 months of total training they are promoted to the final officer candidate rank, Oberfähnrich zur See, equivalent to the NCO rank Hauptbootsmann, and after about 4 years of total training graduate with a bachelor's degree.

== See also ==
- Ranks of the German Bundeswehr
- Rank insignia of the German Bundeswehr
