= Ranks of the German Bundeswehr =

The ranks of the German Armed Forces, (in German: Bundeswehr), were set up by the President with the Anordnung des Bundespräsidenten über die Dienstgradbezeichnungen und die Uniform der Soldaten on the basis of section 4, paragraph 3 of the Soldatengesetz (federal law concerning the legal status of soldiers). The Bundesbesoldungsordnung (Federal Salary Scale Regulation) regulates the salary scales of all Federal office holders and employees including soldiers. The 'ZdV-64/10 – Abkürzungen in der Bundeswehr' gives the abbreviations and a list of the abbreviations.

== Rank structure ==
In all three branches of the German armed forces there are three career paths: officers (Offiziere), NCOs (Unteroffiziere, non-commissioned officers) and enlisted soldiers (Mannschaften). Officers are subdivided into Lieutenants (Leutnante), Captains (Hauptman), Staff Officers (Stabsoffiziere) and Admirals (Admiräle) or Generals (Generäle). NCOs are divided into those with or without a sword knot lanyard (mit / ohne Portepee).

The names of ranks in the army and air force are identical; those of the navy and of medical officers are different. Female soldiers hold the same rank as their male counterparts. A (w) abbreviation is still sometimes added for women, but this is wholly without legal basis – the only additions allowed and maintained in ZDv 14/5 bzw. in the ZDv 20/7 are:

- UA / RUA – NCO Candidate (Unteroffizieranwärter) / Reserve NCO Candidate (Reserveunteroffizier-Anwärter)
- FA / RFA – Sergeant Candidate (Feldwebelanwärter) / Reserve Sergeant Candidate (Reservefeldwebel-Anwärter)
- OA / ROA – Officer Candidate (Offizieranwärter) / Reserve Officer Candidate (Reserveoffizier-Anwärter)
- SanOA – Medical Officer Candidate (Sanitätsoffizieranwärter)
- MilMusikOA – Military Musical Officer Candidate (Militärmusikoffizier-Anwärter)

== Retired personnel ==
After retirement from active duty, former career soldiers are entitled to use their former rank with the addition of the abbreviation a.D. (außer Dienst = ret.) in correspondence.

Retired soldiers may obtain a permission to wear dress uniform on formal social occasions. The uniform also shows the branch and the emblem of the last unit the soldier has served in.

== Reservists ==
Reservists serving as enlisted men, NCOs or Officers add d.R. (der Reserve = of the reserve) after their rank, but only when not on active duty (during an exercise or DVag they are just soldiers, like any other active soldier – there is nothing to mark that they are "only" Reservists) and in correspondence, not in speaking their rank. Like in the active duty, epaulettes demonstrate rank, supplemented by a colored cord which shows the branch the soldier is serving. Special additional cord colors are: Silver: Offizieranwärter (Officer Candidate) Gold: Feldwebelanwärter (Sergeant Candidate) Officer, Sergeant or NCO candidates in the reserve add ROA, RFA or RUA, while active officer, Sergeant or NCO candidates add OA, FA or UA. Reservists have the same promotion periods and service times as active soldiers. Reservists can go through a part of military exercises when they are summoned to join a unit.

== Promotion ==
The promotion ceremony is performed during a regular unit meeting, at a special event or in private. A suitable commander will announce the promotion by reading the order to that effect, while the soldiers to be promoted will stand forward at attention facing the unit. If regular battledress is worn, it is customary that two fellow soldiers from the same rank group, but slightly senior, replace the shoulder strap sleeves from both sides with a pair indicating the new rank. They will then stand in front of the soldier and apply a simultaneous slap with one outstretched arm each on the respective shoulder, so as if to indicate the added weight and responsibility of the new rank.

== Table of ranks ==
=== Army and air force ===
Rank insignia are worn on both shoulders.

See also

⇒ Article: Rank insignia of the German Bundeswehr

==== Enlisted personnel ====
Enlisted personnel (Mannschaften) were largely made up of conscripts serving their term which could be voluntarily extended to a maximum total of 23 months. Since July 2011, compulsory military service has now been suspended during peacetime. Since this was replaced by a purely voluntary service, still a large part of the enlisted personnel are serving less than two years (voluntary military service – two years or more contracts are called Soldier for a Period of Time). Starting as Schütze (Rifleman) or trooper a promotion to Gefreiter rank is expected after primary recruit training (usually after three or six months depending on the service unit). After an additional three months of service (usually consisting of special training required for their branch of service) a soldier is usually promoted to Obergefreiter rank unless they fail even most basic requirements. Enlisted soldiers will usually receive their Hauptgefreiter promotion after nine months to award outstanding performance or after twelve months of service. With higher qualification it is also possible to be promoted to Hauptgefreiter by the first day.

To be promoted Stabsgefreiter a soldier requires at least three years of enlisted service. Soldiers may opt to sign long-term contracts as enlisted soldiers, but most enlisted soldiers serving long terms in fact applied for NCO (non-commissioned officer) careers but failed their training requirements and opted to serve their term as enlisted soldiers rather than being released from service immediately.

To be promoted to Oberstabsgefreiter a soldier requires at least four years of enlisted service.

The most important distinction between NCOs and enlisted men is that the latter cannot give any order even to lower-ranking soldiers unless specific circumstances apply (e.g. while on guard duty or to soldiers ordered to do so by their regular chain of command).

The rank Soldat is replaced by ranks specific to their Truppengattung (branch of service):

- Flieger (Flg) Airman
- Funker (Fu) Signaller
- Grenadier (Gren) Grenadier
- Jäger (Jg) Ranger (lit. Hunter)
- Kanonier (Kan) Gunner/Bombardier
- Matrose (M) Seaman/Sailor
- Pionier (Pi) Engineer
- Panzerfunker (PzFu) Mech. Radioman
- Panzergrenadier (PzGren) Mech. Grenadeer
- Panzerjäger (PzJg) Tank Destroyer/Hunter
- Panzerkanonier (PzKan) Armour Gunner
- Panzerpionier (PzPi) Armour Pioneer
- Panzerschütze (PzSchtz) Tanker/Armour Rifleman
- Panzersoldat (PzSdt) Tanker
- Sanitätssoldat (SanSdt) Medic
- Schütze (Schtz) Rifleman (catch-all rank for supply and other branches)

Heer, Luftwaffe (U.S. Army, U.S. Airforce equivalent according to STANAG 2116)	NATO	Rank insignia	
Heer: Soldat (Private E1); Luftwaffe: Flieger (Airman Basic)	OR-1	Jacke Dienstanzug Heeresuniformträger Panzertruppe	Jacke Dienstanzug Luftwaffenuniformträger
Gefreiter (Private E2) (Airman)	OR-2	Jacke Dienstanzug Heeresuniformträger Jägertruppe	Jacke Dienstanzug Luftwaffenuniformträger
Obergefreiter (Private first class) (Airman 1st class)	OR-3	Jacke Dienstanzug Heeresuniformträger Heeresaufklärungstruppe	Jacke Dienstanzug Luftwaffenuniformträger
Hauptgefreiter (Private first class) (Airman 1st class)	OR-3	Jacke Dienstanzug Heeresuniformträger Artillerietruppe	Jacke Dienstanzug Luftwaffenuniformträger
Stabsgefreiter (Specialist) (Senior Airman)	OR-4	Jacke Dienstanzug Heeresuniformträger Heeresflugabwehrtruppe	Jacke Dienstanzug Luftwaffenuniformträger
Oberstabsgefreiter (Specialist) (Senior Airman)	OR-4	Jacke Dienstanzug Heeresuniformträger Fernmeldetruppe	Jacke Dienstanzug Luftwaffenuniformträger
Korporal (Corporal) (Senior Airman)	OR-4	Jacke Dienstanzug Heeresuniformträger Fernmeldetruppe	Jacke Dienstanzug Luftwaffenuniformträger
Stabskorporal (Staff corporal) (Senior Airman)	OR-4	Jacke Dienstanzug Heeresuniformträger Fernmeldetruppe	Jacke Dienstanzug Luftwaffenuniformträger

==== Non-commissioned officers ====
Heer, Luftwaffe (U.S. Army, U.S. Airforce equivalent according to STANAG 2116)	NATO	Rank insignia	
Non-commissioned Officers "without swordknot"/ Unteroffiziere "ohne Portepee"
Unteroffizier (Sergeant) (Staff Sergeant)	OR-5	Jacke Dienstanzug Heeresuniformträger Panzergrenadiertruppe	Jacke Dienstanzug Luftwaffenuniformträger
Stabsunteroffizier (Sergeant) (Staff Sergeant)	OR-5	Jacke Dienstanzug Heeresuniformträger Panzertruppe	Jacke Dienstanzug Luftwaffenuniformträger
Non-commissioned Officers "with swordknot"/ Unteroffiziere "mit Portepee"
Feldwebel (Staff Sergeant) (Technical Sergeant)	OR-6	Jacke Dienstanzug Heeresuniformträger Artillerietruppe	Jacke Dienstanzug Luftwaffenuniformträger
Oberfeldwebel (Staff Sergeant) (Technical Sergeant)	OR-6	Jacke Dienstanzug Heeresuniformträger Heeresflugabwehrtruppe	Jacke Dienstanzug Luftwaffenuniformträger
Hauptfeldwebel (Sergeant First Class) (Master Sergeant)	OR-7	Jacke Dienstanzug Heeresuniformträger ABC-Abwehrtruppe	Jacke Dienstanzug Luftwaffenuniformträger
Stabsfeldwebel (Master Sergeant) (Senior Master Sergeant)	OR-8	Jacke Dienstanzug Heeresuniformträger Fernmeldetruppe	Jacke Dienstanzug Luftwaffenuniformträger
Oberstabsfeldwebel (Sergeant-Major) (Chief Master Sergeant)	OR-9	Jacke Dienstanzug Heeresuniformträger Heeresaufklärungstruppe	Jacke Dienstanzug Luftwaffenuniformträger

NCOs (Unteroffiziere) play an important role in the Heer as they are entrusted the command of most sub-company units. They often are referred to as the backbone of the army. Especially Feldwebels and above carry similar responsibilities officers have. This is largely due to the German military doctrine of Auftragstaktik: German orders usually do not include specific instructions, but rather a task, the available time and the available means. This gives leaders of smaller units a great deal of freedom and responsibility.

Since the ancient time of Prussian Army, the non-commissioned officers or subofficers of German armies are distinguished into

- Unteroffiziere ohne Portepee (sub-officers without lanyard)
- Unteroffiziere mit Portepee (sub-officers with lanyard)

These terms originate from the tradition that Prussian NCOs from the rank of Feldwebel upwards were entitled to bear a lanyard on their sabre.

Soldiers have the possibility to start with the rank of an Unteroffizier or even Stabsunteroffizier if they already have a civil apprenticeship which qualifies them for any army-equivalent position. Civil master craftsman of army-relevant jobs may directly start as Feldwebel. The army decides depending on the availability of positions.

The promotion to Oberfeldwebel is regularly given after one year as Feldwebel. Any higher rank requires a certain number of years in their previous rank and performance. Soldiers with at least eight years active duty (six for flying crews and those in some other positions), of which five are as a Feldwebel, are eligible for promotion to Hauptfeldwebel. Those serving for at least 12 years have the chance to become a Stabsfeldwebel. 16 years after promotion to Feldwebel, and six years after promotion to hauptfeldwebel a soldier may be eligible for promotion to Oberstabsfeldwebel.

These rules apply for navy sub-officers in the same way.

Heer, Luftwaffe	NATO	Rank insignia	
Non-commissioned Officers – Officer Cadets
Fahnenjunker (Ensign esquire)	OR-5	Jacke Dienstanzug Heeresuniformträger Panzertruppe	Jacke Dienstanzug Luftwaffenuniformträger
Fähnrich (Ensign)	OR-6	Jacke Dienstanzug Heeresuniformträger Pioniertruppe	Jacke Dienstanzug Luftwaffenuniformträger
Oberfähnrich (Leading ensign)	OR-7	Jacke Dienstanzug Heeresuniformträger Heeresfliegertruppe	Jacke Dienstanzug Luftwaffenuniformträger

==== Officer education in the army ====
Career officers usually start out as enlisted personnel with the lowest rank in one of the three officer candidate battalions of the German Army located in Hammelburg, Idar-Oberstein and Munster. After six months of officer candidate training course in these battalions, containing basic military drill, military law and history, the officer candidates proceed with the Officer's Course 1.

These are held at the Officer's School in Dresden for three months, followed by a 10-week period for training English and three months of active service, the so-called Truppenkommando as regular soldier in a military unit.

After 15 months, the officer candidates attend one of the two Universities of the German Federal Armed Forces in Munich and Hamburg to attain a master's degree after four years of study.

After promotion to Leutnant (second lieutenant) they continue with the Officer's Course 2 at the Army Officer's School and the Officer's Course 3 at their respective branch-schools.

Furthermore, they attend required special training courses like a survival or driving school for the different vehicles of their branch.

When this six-year-training is concluded, the officers are promoted to Oberleutnant (first lieutenant) and transferred to their army-units for regular service.

Heer, Luftwaffe (U.S. Army, U.S. Airforce equivalent according to STANAG 2116)	NATO	Rank insignia	
Subalterns (de: Leutnante)
Leutnant (Second Lieutenant)	OF-1b OF-1a	Jacke Dienstanzug Heeresuniformträger Fallschirmjägertruppe	Jacke Dienstanzug Luftwaffenuniformträger
Oberleutnant (First Lieutenant)	OF-1b OF-1a	Jacke Dienstanzug Heeresuniformträger Panzertruppe	Jacke Dienstanzug Luftwaffenuniformträger
Captains (de: Hauptleute)
Hauptmann (Captain)	OF-2b OF-2a	Jacke Dienstanzug Heeresuniformträger Heeresaufklärungstruppe	Jacke Dienstanzug Luftwaffenuniformträger
Stabshauptmann (Captain)	OF-2b OF-2a	Jacke Dienstanzug Heeresuniformträger Artillerietruppe	Jacke Dienstanzug Luftwaffenuniformträger
Field grade officers (de: Stabsoffiziere)
Major (Major)	OF-3	Jacke Dienstanzug Heeresuniformträger Fedljägertruppe	Jacke Dienstanzug Luftwaffenuniformträger
Oberstleutnant (Lieutenant colonel)	OF-4	Jacke Dienstanzug Heeresuniformträger Heeresflugabwehrtruppe	Jacke Dienstanzug Luftwaffenuniformträger
Oberst (Colonel)	OF-5	Jacke Dienstanzug Heeresuniformträger i.G.	Jacke Dienstanzug Luftwaffenuniformträger

==== Officer education in the air force ====
In the air force the career starts at the air force academy in Fürstenfeldbruck (Fürsti) near Munich. The basic officers training consists of 11 months of basic training, military drill, theoretical education and a few weeks in a Luftwaffenausbildungsregiment (air force training regiment) as a deputy instructor with the rank of Obergefreiter OA. With the completion of the Offizierschule der Luftwaffe (OSLw) they are promoted to Fahnenjunker and either start with their studies at one of the two universities in Munich and Hamburg, or start with their basic flight training.

==== Field grade officers ====
In order to be promoted to Major (major; a rank only career officers can achieve), the officers have to complete successfully a course called Basislehrgang Stabsoffizier (BLS) (field grade officer basic course). It takes a minimum of 10 years of officer's service to become a major. Oberstleutnant '(lt.-col.) is the standard final rank for career officers which can be awarded after 17 years of service. The salary of this rank depends on the respective function (A 14 or A 15 in the German salary scheme). Oberst (colonel) is the highest field grade rank (promotion requires a minimum of 17 years of officer's service, i.e. 20 years of service overall).

==== Officers in General Staff Service ====
About 1.5 percent of each cohort are chosen to take part in the Generalstabslehrgang (general staff course) at the Führungsakademie der Bundeswehr (military academy) at Hamburg. This course lasts two years after the completion of which the participants put a "i.G." after their rank in case they serve on a corresponding post in a staff (at least in a brigade staff), meaning im Generalstabsdienst (in general staff service). Having completed this course, the minimum rank those officers achieve is usually Oberst (colonel). The Generalstabslehrgang is a requirement for promotion to a General's rank.

== Notable cases ==
=== Officers of the medical service ===
Officers of the medical service of the Bundeswehr are non-line officers in the special careers of the medical, dental, veterinary and pharmacy branches. Medical service officer have rank titles that are different from line-officers and with slight differences between branches, e.g. a medical officer holding a rank equivalent to Hauptmann is called Stabsarzt, a veterinary officer Stabsveterinär and a pharmacy officer Stabsapotheker.

Versions for officers and officer candidates of the medical service

Sanitätssoldat SanOA
(Army Medical Officer Candidate with the equivalent rank of private E2)

Gefreiter SanOA
(Airforce Medical Officer Candidate with the equivalent rank of Airman)

Oberfeldwebel SanOA
(Army Veterinary Officer Candidate with the equivalent rank of Staff Sergeant)

Fähnrich zur See SanOA
(Naval Pharmacy Cadet with the equivalent rank of Petty Officer 1st Class)

Leutnant zur See SanOA
Naval Medical Officer Student with the rank of Ensign)

Stabsarzt
(Army Medical Officer with the equivalent rank of Captain)

Oberstabsapotheker
(Air Force Pharmacy Officer with the equivalent rank of Major)

Flottenarzt
(Naval Medical Officer with the equivalent rank of Captain)

Oberfeldarzt
(Army Medical Officer with the equivalent rank of Lieutenant Colonel)

Oberstveterinär
(Army Veterinary Officer with the equivalent rank of Colonel)

Generalarzt
(Army Dental Officer with the equivalent rank of Brigadier General)

Generalstabsarzt
(Airforce Medical Officer with the equivalent rank of Major General)

Generaloberstabsarzt
(Army Dental Officer with the rank of Lieutenant General)

=== Generalmajor and Generalleutnant ===
While a major by far outranks a lieutenant, a lieutenant general outranks a major general. This phenomenon, which the Bundeswehr shares with most armed forces (including English-speaking ones) and the former Wehrmacht (where the ranks were one degree lower, as there did not exist a brigadier general), requires explanation. The reason is that in the Early Modern Period, a company would be commanded by a captain, with assistance of a lieutenant and a Wachtmeister (sergeant, similar to Feldwebel). A regiment, on the other hand would be commanded by a colonel (Oberst, i. e. Obersthauptmann - literally "supreme captain"), with assistance of a lieutenant colonel and an Oberstwachtmeister (sergeant major). A whole army, then, quite logically was commanded by a general (Generalhauptmann - captain general), with assistance of a lieutenant general and a Generalwachtmeister (sergeant major general). When for the Oberstwachtmeister the name major became common, it was also adapted to the Generalwachtmeister, which then became major general while still inferior to lieutenant general. (Outside Germany, the former Wachtmeister on the company-size by the same transfer became known as the sergeant major.)

=== Historical ranks in the Prussian Army of Frederick the Great ===
Prussian Army ranks 1740–1865
Rank	Explanation/Duties
Feldmarschall	Commander of an army
Feldzeugmeister	
General der Infanterie	General of the Infantry
General der Kavallerie	General of the Cavalry
General en Chef	Multiple layers of responsibility, Continued to hold his position as "chef" (Inhaber/Proprietor)
Generalleutnant	
Feldmarschalleutnant	Lieutenant Feldmarschall
Generalmajor	Major general, in broad use in Prussia after 1820
Generalfeldwachtmeister	Archaic, out of practice by 1860. Commanded the field camp.
Generalquartiermeister	Responsible for supplies
Oberst	Colonel, frequently also held the position of Inhaber or Proprietor of a regiment
Oberstleutnant	Lieutenant colonel
Major	Major
Hauptman	Captain
Rittmeister	Cavalry captain
Stabskapitan	Staff captain
Premierleutnant	First lieutenant
Leutnant	Lieutenant
Fähnrich	Young man, usually less than a year out of military academy, carried the unit flag.
Cornet	Recently joined, from military academy
Cadet	student in military academy, 12–14 years
