= Maat (rank) =

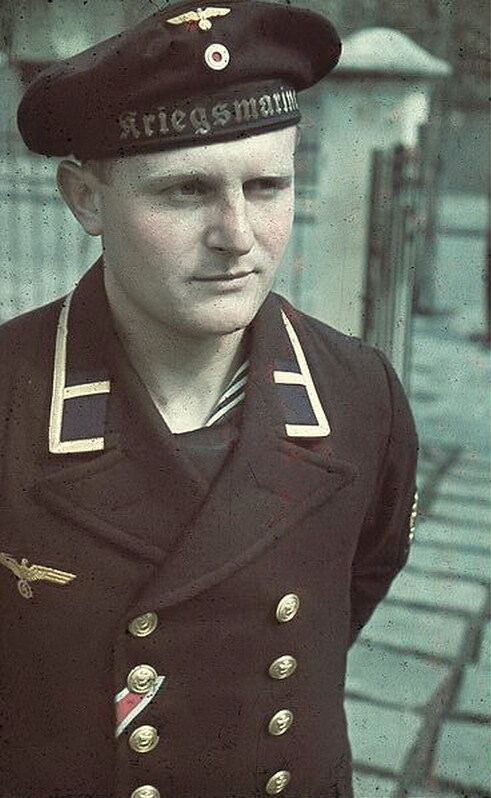
Maat Horst Grund, pictured in Kriegsmarine uniform, 1941

Maat ([ˈmaːt], lit. 'mate') is a naval rank, of German origin, used by a number of countries. The term is derived from the low German māt (comrade). Via the Dutch language, the word became a nautical term and described the assistant to a deck officer. Since the second half of the 17th century Maate were the lowest class of non-commissioned officers aboard a warship.

== Denmark ==
Rank insignia of Math for the Royal Danish Army, used on the M/58 (1951–1960).

In 1951, it was decided to end the conscription–based military in Denmark and transition to a professional military. As such, the math rank was introduced, replacing the rank of menig given to all conscripted soldiers. With the math rank, soldiers were signed on to a contract following completion of basic training. By 1960, the math rank was replaced by the constable rank system.

== Estonia ==
NATO code	OR-5	OR-4
Estonian	Vanemmaat	Maat	Nooremmaat
Estonian Navy
Estonian Navy	Senior mate	Mate	Junior mate
Official translation	Petty officer 1st class	Petty officer 2nd class	Petty officer 3rd class

== Germany ==
Maat
- Shoulder board / cuff title / mounting loop
- Country: Germany
- Service branch: German Navy
- Abbreviation: MT
- NATO rank code: OR-5
- Formation: 1955 Modern
- Next higher rank: Obermaat
- Next lower rank: Oberstabsgefreiter
- Equivalent ranks: Unteroffizier (Army & Air force)

However, Maate is also the collective name to all junior NCO-ranks (ranks: Maat, Seekadett, and Obermaat) in the modern day's German Navy.

In navy context NCOs of this rank were formally addressed as Herr/ Frau Maat also informally / short Maat. The sequence of ranks (top-down approach) in that particular group is as follows:
Unteroffizier ohne Portepee

- OR-5: Obermaat / (Heer/ Luftwaffe) Stabsunteroffizier
- OR-5: Seekadett / Fahnenjunker
- OR-5: Maat / Unteroffizier

=== History ===
In the Prussian Navy and the Kaiserliche Marine Maate were Unteroffiziere ohne Portepee. According to their specialization, Maate would be known as e.g. Steuermannsmaat (Coxswain's Mate), Feuerwerksmaat (Ordnance Mate), Bootsmannsmaat (Boatswain's Mate) or Maschinistenmaat (Machinist's Mate). Maate were recruited among conscripts who volunteered to serve for a minimum of six years. After approximately four years they could expect to become Maat. Re-enlistment was common but in most specialities the career options would end with achieving the rank of Obermaat; only after 18 years in service was a promotion as supernumary Vizefeldwebel possible, and only if there was a billet open. The 1914/15 naval budget included 7857 billets for Maate and 5237 for Obermaate.

==== Kriegsmarine ====
Maate (Unteroffiziere ohne Portepee)
Title	Maat	
Epaulette (Shore troops only)		
Collar tab		
Sleeve insignia		
Sleeve insignia	Steuermannmaat	Bootsmannmaat
German Army equivalent	Unteroffizier	
US Equivalent	Petty officer, third class	

== Poland ==
NATO code	OR-4		OR-3
Polish	Bosmanmat	Starszy mat	Mat
Polish Navy
Polish Navy	Boatswain mate	Senior mate	Mate

== See also ==
- Ranks of the German Bundeswehr
- Rank insignia of the German Bundeswehr
- Ranks and insignia of NATO navies enlisted
