= Fahnenjunker =

Military rank of the Bundeswehr and of some former German armed forces

- Heer and Luftwaffe shoulder insignia
- Country: Germany
- Service branch: German Army; German Air Force
- Abbreviation: Fhj
- Rank: German NCO rank
- NATO rank code: OR-5
- Non-NATO rank: E-5
- Formation: 1966
- Next higher rank: Stabsunteroffizier
- Next lower rank: Oberstabsgefreiter
- Equivalent ranks: Seekadett

Fahnenjunker (short Fhj or FJ, English: officer cadet; lit. 'flag junker') is a military rank of the Bundeswehr and of some former German armed forces. In earlier German armed forces it was also the collective name for many officer aspirant ranks. It was established by the Presidential order of the Federal president on rank insignia and uniforms of soldiers.

== Rank ==
Fahnenjunker is the entrance rank to an officer aspirant career. According to the salary class, it is equivalent to the Unteroffizier ohne Portepee ranks Unteroffizier of the army or air force, and Maat of the Deutsche Marine. It is also grouped as OR-5 in NATO, equivalent to Sergeant, Staff Sergeant in the US Armed forces.

In the army context, NCOs of this rank were formally addressed as Herr/ Frau Fahnenjunker also informally / short Fahnenjunker.

The sequence of ranks (top-down approach) in that particular group is as follows:
Unteroffizier ohne Portepee

- OR-5: Stabsunteroffizier / (Marine) Obermaat
- OR-5: Fahnenjunker / Seekadett
- OR-5: Unteroffizier / Maat

Preceded by junior Rank; Oberstabsgefreiter	'Fahnenjunker'	Succeeded by senior Rank; Stabsunteroffizier Unteroffizier

== Rank insignia ==
=== Bundeswehr ===
An officer candidate's career is indicated by the enlisted rank with a thin silver cord on the shoulder strap in the army and the air force, and with the golden nautical star on the shoulder strap and sleeve in the Deutsche Marine.

The rank insignia of Fahnenjunker consists of shoulder straps, bordered by a golden braid that is open to the sleeve seam. Fahnenjunker of the air force wear an additional Air Force wing on the open end of the braid. The rank insignia on field and battle dress are in black colour.

Below the lowest officer designated rank of "Fahnenjunker," any military person who is assigned to be a career officer has to wear the two capital letters “OA” in addition to the particular rank, indicating the “Officer Aspirant” career.

from 1956	German Navy
Distinction	Oberfähnrich (Senior cadet sergeant)	Fähnrich (Cadet sergeant)	Fahnenjunker (Officer cadet senior grade)	Oberfähnrich (Senior aviation cadet)	Fähnrich (Aviation cadet)	Fahnenjunker' (Officer cadet senior grade)	Oberfähnrich zur See (Senior midshipman)	Fähnrich zur See (Midshipman)	Seekadett (Naval cadet)
Rangcode	(OR-7)	(OR-6)	(OR-5)	(OR-7)	(OR-6)	(OR-5)	(OR-7)	(OR-6)	(OR-5)
NATO	Cadet sergeant	Midshipman
USAF	Aviation cadet and Warrant Officer
RAF	Acting pilot officer

=== Wehrmacht and Waffen-SS ===
	Fahnenjunker/Junker
German Army & Luftwaffe
German Army & Luftwaffe	Fahnenjunker- stabsfeldwebel	Fahnenjunker- oberfeldwebel	Fahnenjunker- feldwebel	Fahnenjunker- unterfeldwebel	Fahnenjunker- unteroffizier
Waffen-SS
Waffen-SS		SS-Standarten- oberjunker	SS-Standarten- junker	SS-Oberjunker	SS-Junker

== See also ==
- Fanjunkare
