= Stabsunteroffizier =

Military rank

Stabsunteroffizier is a military rank of the German Bundeswehr. It was preceded by the rank Unterfeldwebel that was used between 1935 and 1945 in the armed forces of Nazi Germany, the Wehrmacht. The East German National People's Army used the rank Unterfeldwebel from 1956 to 1990. In the Austrian Armed Forces Stabsunteroffizier is the collective name to all higher Non-commissioned officers.

== Austria ==
Stabsunteroffizier(e), also Stabsunteroffizier corps (transl. Staff non-commissioned officer), is the collective name to all senior NCO-ranks in the modern day's Austrian Bundesheer. It comprises the ranks of the assignment group M ZUO 1 (longer-serving NCO 1; de: Unteroffiziere auf Zeit 1) with the ranks Stabswachtmeister, Oberstabswachtmeister, and Offiziersstellvertreter. The assignment group M BUO 1 (professional NCOs 1; de: Berufsunteroffiziere 1) comprises additionally the highest NCO-rank Vizeleutnant.

Training and education of the Stabsunteroffizier corps was reformed in 1995 and until 2000 finally introduced to the armed forces. First affected were professional NCOs of the assignment group M BUO 1. The number of trainees was limited to 150 persons in uniform, with a service time of at least four years, with the rank Wachtmeister upward and very good level at English language.

In the result of a positive entrance examination aspirants attended the Staff-NCO trainings course (new) on the Heeresunteroffiziersakademie (HUAk) in Enns. The one year study is divided in two semesters. The first semester (six month duration) is provided by the HUAk, and the second semester (six month duration) has to be offered by the appropriate service branch (Waffengattung) or technical college (Fachschule). After positive HUAk-graduation regular assignments to a Stabsunteroffizier might be platoon commander (Zugführer), or service in a military staff or headquarters.

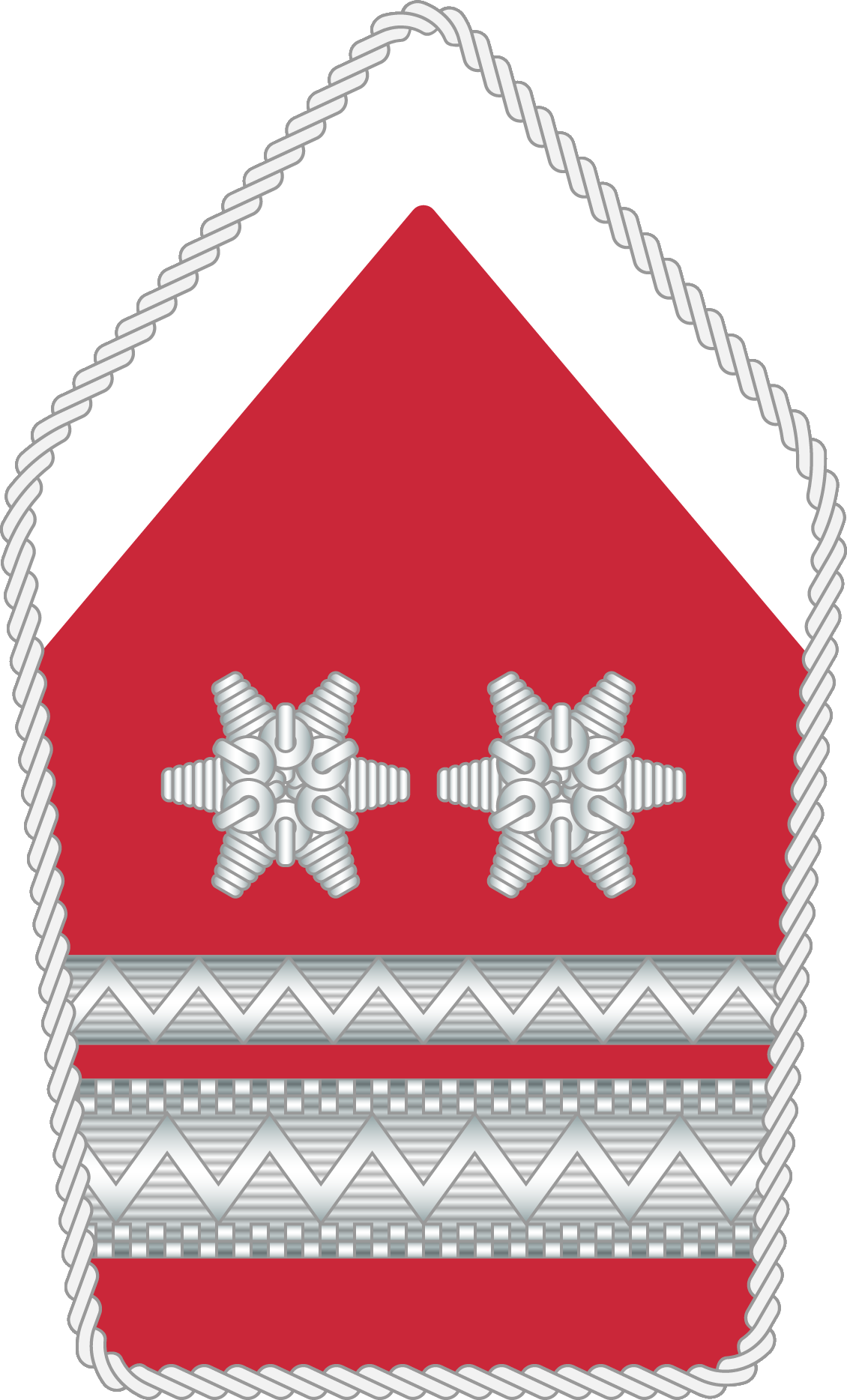
Rank group	Staff non-commissioned officer (Stabsunteroffizier)
Flat cap
Service uniform
Field uniform
	Vizeleutnant	Offiziersstellvertreter	Oberstabswachtmeister	Stabswachtmeister
Official translation	Warrant officer I	Warrant officer II	Warrant officer III	Staff sergeant
Equivalent NATO code (Note: While Austria is not a member of NATO, it does have an official conversion.)	OR-9		OR-8	OR-7

== Germany ==
Stabsunteroffizier
- Heer and Luftwaffe shoulder insignia
- Country: Germany
- Service branch: German Army; German Air Force
- Abbreviation: StUffz
- Rank: Unteroffiziere ohne Portepee grade
- NATO rank code: OR-5
- Formation: 1955
- Next higher rank: Feldwebel
- Next lower rank: Fahnenjunker
- Equivalent ranks: Obermaat

rank insignia field- and battle dress

Heer

Luftwaffe

Marine

Stabsunteroffizier (short StUffz or SU) is a military rank of the Deutsche Bundeswehr to persons in uniform of the Heer and Luftwaffe. Legal basis is the Presidential order of the Federal president (de: Bundespräsident) on rank insignia and uniforms of soldiers

=== Rank ===
Stabsunteroffizier is the highest NCO-grade of the rank group Unteroffizier ohne Portepee.

According to the salary class (A 6-7) it is equivalent to the Obermaat of Deutsche Marine. It is also grouped as OR-5 in NATO, equivalent to Sergeant, Staff Sergeant in the US Armed forces.

In army context NCOs of this rank were formally addressed as Herr/ Frau Stabsunteroffizier also informally / short StUffz.

The sequence of ranks (top-down approach) in that particular group is as follows:
Unteroffizier ohne Portepee

- OR-5: Stabsunteroffizier / (Marine) Obermaat
- OR-5: Fahnenjunker / Seekadett
- OR-5: Unteroffizier / Maat

The abbreviation "OR" stands for "Other Ranks".

Preceded by junior Rank; Unteroffizier Fahnenjunker	'Stabsunteroffizier'	Succeeded by 'senior Rank; Feldwebel'
