= Presidential Order on Rank Designation and Uniform of Soldiers =

German military presidential decree

In Germany, the Presidential Order on Rank Designation and Uniform of Soldiers (Anordnung des Bundespräsidenten über die Dienstgradbezeichnungen und die Uniform der Soldaten) is a presidential decree on the ranks and uniforms of the German Federal Defence Forces (Bundeswehr). It was issued on 30 August 2021.
