= Unteroffiziere ohne Portepee =

Grouping of German junior NCO ranks

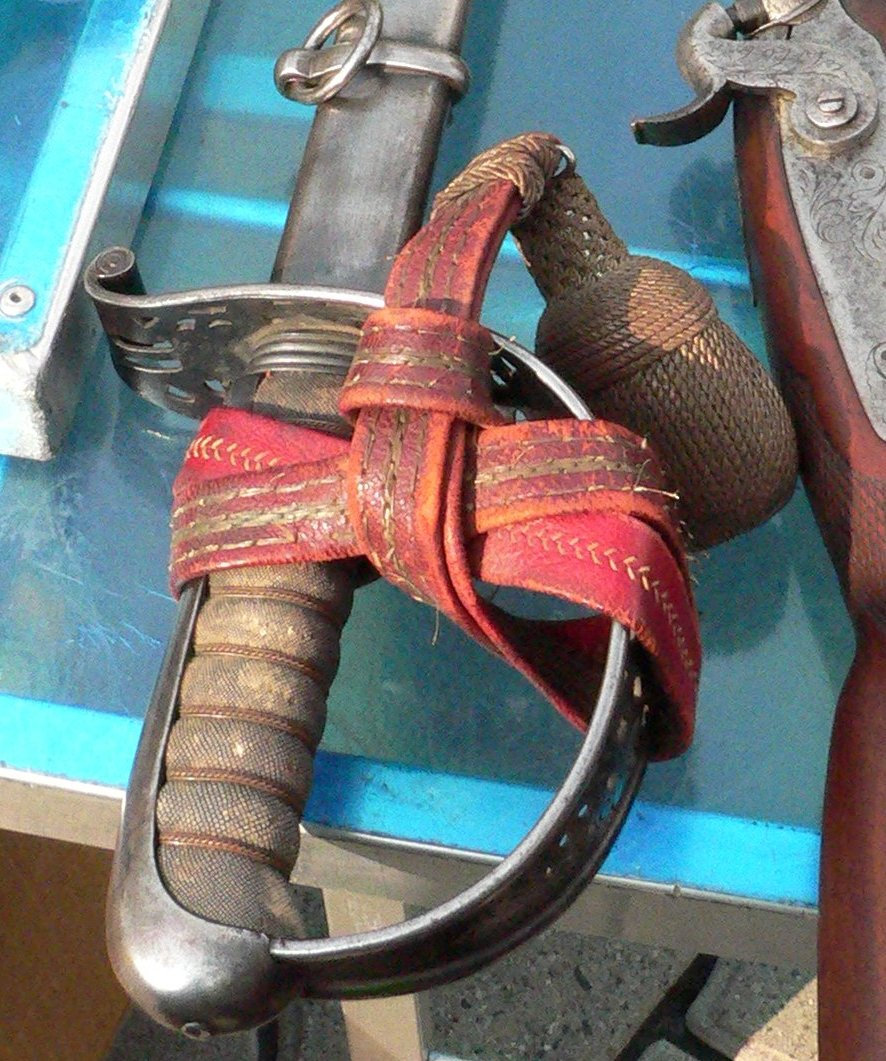
A sword knot fixed to hilt of an infantry sabre.

Unteroffizier(e) ohne Portepee (transl. Non-commissioned officer(s) without sword knot), is the designation for German junior non-commissioned officers (NCOs) in the German Armed Forces. The category was a division of the NCO class, separating junior NCOs from Unteroffiziere mit Portepee, or senior NCOs (who wore the sword knot). The name is derived from earlier traditions in which German senior NCOs (Feldwebel) would carry the officer's sidearms (sword, sabre) with the officer's swordknot (made from silver or gold lace).

Ranks in this category:

- Unteroffizier (navy: Maat)
- Fahnenjunker (navy: Seekadett)
- Stabsunteroffizier (navy: Obermaat, historical: Unterfeldwebel / Unterwachtmeister)

== Table of ranks ==
Rank insignia to NCOs without portepée of Heer, Luftwaffe and Marine
German payment level	A 6-7	A 5
Shoulder straps service uniform/ field uniform
rank	Stabsunteroffizier	Fahnenjunker	Unteroffizier
Shoulder straps cuff insignias field uniform
rank	Obermaat	Seekadett	Maat
NATO rank	OR-5

== See also ==
- Unteroffiziere mit Portepee - NCOs with portepee
- Rank insignia of the German Bundeswehr
