= Hauptmann =

Officer's rank in the German, Austrian, and Swiss armies

Hauptmann (German: [ˈhaʊ̯pman]) is an officer rank in the armies of Germany, Austria, and Switzerland. It is usually translated as captain.

== Background ==
While Haupt in contemporary German means 'main', it also has, and originally had, the meaning of 'head', i.e. Hauptmann literally translates to 'head-man', which is also the etymological root of captain (from Latin caput, 'head').

This rank is equivalent to the rank of captain in the British and US Armies, and is rated OF-2 in NATO.

Currently, there is no female form within the German military (such as Hauptfrau): the correct form of address is "Frau Hauptmann."

More generally, a Hauptmann can be the head of any hierarchically structured group of people, often as a compound word. For example, a Feuerwehrhauptmann is the captain of a fire brigade, while Räuberhauptmann refers to the leader of a gang of robbers.

Official Austrian and German titles incorporating the word include Landeshauptmann, Bezirkshauptmann, Burghauptmann, and Berghauptmann.

In Saxony during the Weimar Republic, the titles of Kreishauptmann, and Amtshauptmann were held by senior civil servants.

Hauptmann (from Early Modern High German Heubtmann) is cognate with the Swedish hövitsman, which also has the root meaning 'head-man' or 'the man at the head', and is closely related to hövding, meaning 'chieftain'. Since medieval times, both titles have been used for state administrators rather than military personnel. Heubtmann may also be the origin of the title hetman, used in Central and Eastern Europe.

== Military ranks ==
=== Austria ===
Captain Hauptmann
- Peaked cap

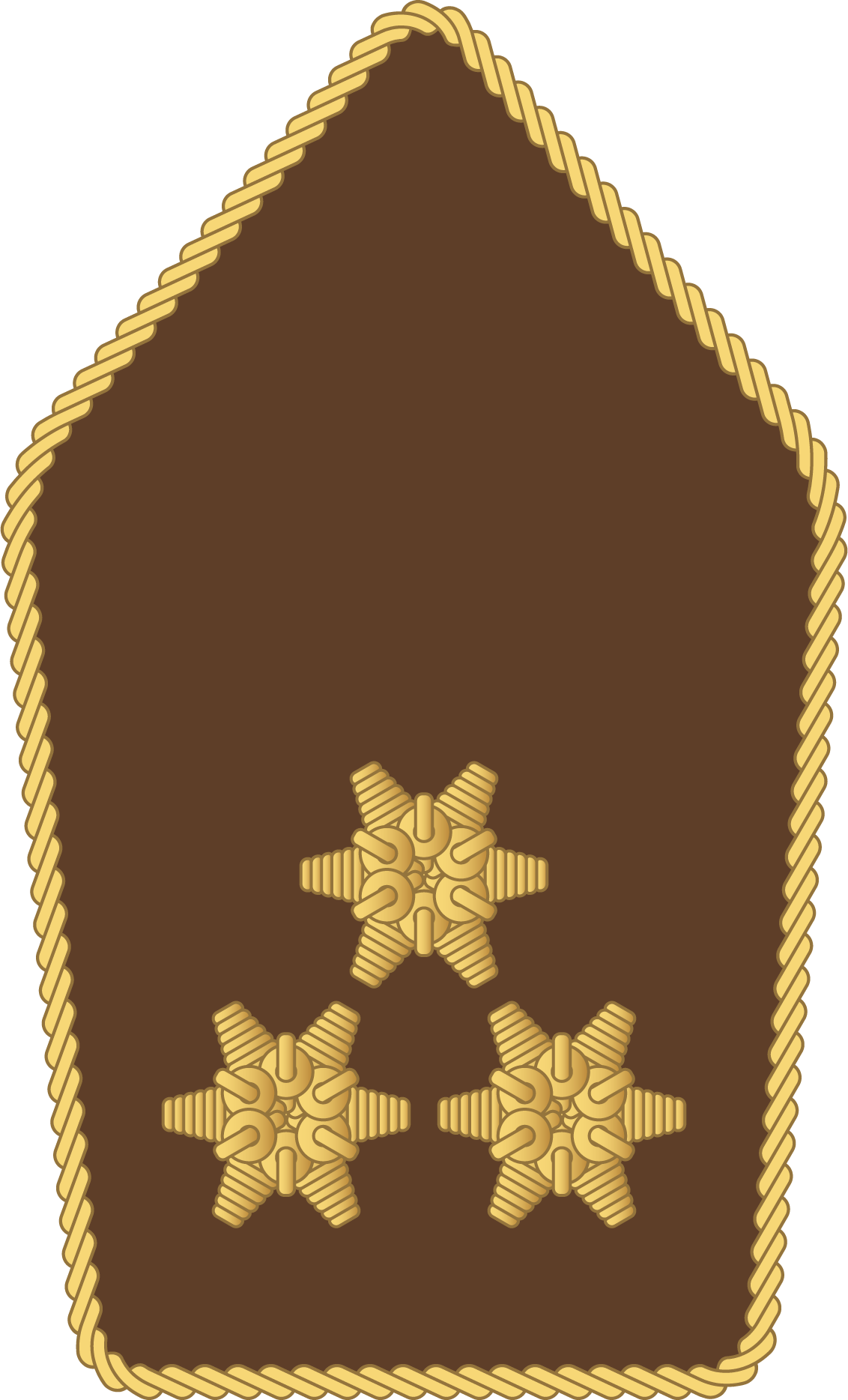
- Field uniform | service uniform
- Country: Austria
- Service branch: Austrian Armed Forces
- Abbreviation: Hptm
- Rank group: Junior officer
- Non-NATO rank: OF-2
- Next higher rank: Major
- Next lower rank: Oberleutnant

=== Germany ===
Captain Hauptmann
- Army and Air Force insignia
- Country: Germany
- Service branch: German Army; German Air Force
- Abbreviation: H or Hptm
- NATO rank code: OF-2
- Formation: 19th century
- Next higher rank: Stabshauptmann
- Next lower rank: Oberleutnant
- Equivalent ranks: Kapitänleutnant (Navy)

==== Rank insignia ====
On the shoulder straps (Heer, Luftwaffe) there are three silver pips (stars).

Heer	Luftwaffe
Hauptmann i.G. (Gen. staff service) Hauptmann (Mechanized infantry) Hauptmann d.R. (Mech. infantry reserves)	Hauptmann (field suit)

=== Switzerland ===
Rank insignia for Hauptmann

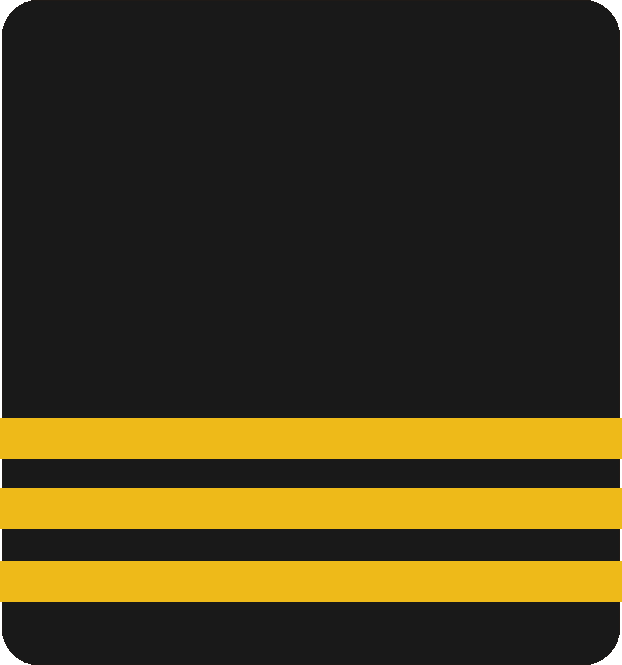
Army

==== Swiss Guard ====
Rank insignia for Hauptmann

Army

== See also ==
- World War II German Army ranks and insignia
- Ranks of the German Bundeswehr
- Rank insignia of the German Bundeswehr
