= Unteroffizier =

Non-commissioned officer rank

Unteroffizier (lit. 'Under officer') is a junior non-commissioned officer rank used by the Bundeswehr. It is also the collective name for all non-commissioned officers in Austria and Germany. The Dutch version (onderofficier) is used by the Dutch armed forces. It was formerly a rank in the Imperial Russian Army.

== Austria ==
Unteroffizier(e), also Unteroffizier corps, is the collective name to all junior NCO-ranks in the modern day's Austrian Bundesheer. It comprises the ranks of the assignment group M BUO 2 (professional NCO 2; de: Berufsunteroffizier 2) with the rank Oberwachtmeister (OR6), and M ZUO 2 (time serving NCO 2; de: Zeitunteroffizier 2) with the rank Wachtmeister (OR5).

Training and education of the Unteroffizier corps was reformed in 1995 and until 2000 finally introduced to the armed forces. First effected were professional NCOs of the assignment group M BUO 1 (Stabsunteroffiziere, staff NCO's), followed by the assignment group M BUO 2 (Unteroffiziere, NCO's).

In the result of a positive entrance examination aspirants attended the NCO trainings course (new) on the Heeresunteroffiziersakademie (HUAk) in Enns. After positive HUAk-graduation regular assignments to a Unteroffizier might be squad leader (de: Gruppenkommandant), or service in a military staff or headquarters.

Rank group	NCOs (de: Unteroffiziere)
Field uniform
Jacket gorget
Corps colour	Medical service	Aviator
Flat cap
Rank	Oberwachtmeister (OWm)	Wachtmeister (Wm)

== Denmark ==
Within the Danish military, underofficer is the sub-group for non-commissioned officers to the overall category of befalingsmænd (lit. 'commanders'). They are also classified as Middle management level, with a pay grade group of M2XX.

NATO code	OR-9	OR-8	OR-7	OR-6	OR5
Rank group	Middle management level (Mellemlederniveau)
Royal Danish Army				—
Royal Danish Army	Chefsergent	Seniorsergent	Oversergent	—	Sergent
Royal Danish Navy				—
Royal Danish Navy	Chefsergent	Seniorsergent	Oversergent	—	Sergent
Royal Danish Air Force				—
Royal Danish Air Force	Chefsergent	Seniorsergent	Oversergent	—	Sergent
Danish pay grade	M232	M231	M221	—	M212

== Germany ==
Unteroffizier
- Army and air force shoulder insignia
- Country: Germany
- Service branch: German Army; German Air Force
- Abbreviation: Uffz (U)
- Rank: Unteroffiziere ohne Portepee grade
- NATO rank code: OR-5
- Formation: 1957
- Next higher rank: Stabsunteroffizier
- Next lower rank: Stabskorporal
- Equivalent ranks: Maat

Related articles
- History: Unterfeldwebel

rank insignia field- and battle dress

Heer

Luftwaffe

Marine

Unteroffizier is both a specific Bundeswehr military rank as well as a generic term for any non-commissioned officer (NCO) in the army and air force, while in the navy the term Deckoffizier is used. It has existed since the 17th century. Rated OR-5 within the NATO ranking system, it is equal to UK/US rank of Sergeant.

Until the end of German Reich, the equivalent of Unteroffizier rank in Jäger units was Oberjäger.

There are two classes of non-commissioned officers

- Unteroffiziere ohne Portepee, comprising:
  - Unteroffizier and Fahnenjunker (Maat ⇒ see main article German Navy)
  - Stabsunteroffizier (Obermaat)
- Unteroffiziere mit Portepee, comprising:
  - Feldwebel and Fähnrich (Bootsmann)
  - Oberfeldwebel (Oberbootsmann)
  - Hauptfeldwebel and Oberfähnrich (Hauptbootsmann)
  - Stabsfeldwebel (Stabsbootsmann)
  - Oberstabsfeldwebel (Oberstabsbootsmann)

Informally, the non-commissioned officers "mit Portepee" are often called "Feldwebel ranks", which creates confusion as the collective term Unteroffizier already exists. The word Unteroffizier, in turn, is getting a third meaning, namely: non-commissioned officer ohne Portepee, as opposed to "Feldwebel ranks".

Unteroffizier translates as "subordinate-officer" and, when meaning the specific rank, is in modern-day usage considered the equivalent to sergeant under the NATO rank scale. Historically the Unteroffizier rank was considered a corporal and thus similar in duties to a British Army corporal. In peacetime an Unteroffizier was a career soldier who trained conscripts or led squads and platoons. He could rise through the ranks to become an Unteroffizier mit Portepee, i.e. a Feldwebel, which was the highest rank a career soldier could reach. Since the German officer corps was immensely class conscious a rise through the ranks from a NCO to become an officer was hardly possible except in times of war.

The Unteroffizierskorps was made up of professional soldiers which formed the backbone of German armies. This tradition has not been changed by the Bundeswehr where all ranks of Unteroffizier and up consist only of professional soldiers who sign up for a period extending conscription.

Unteroffizier is one of the few German military ranks whose insignia has remained unchanged over the past one hundred years. The shoulder boards of a modern Unteroffizier are relatively similar to the World War I and World War II designs.

A modern-day German Bundeswehr Unteroffizier typically commands squad sized formations or acts as an assistant platoon NCO. The rank is also used in the modern-day German Air Force. In the Bundeswehr the grade of Stabsunteroffizier (a junior NCO) ranks between Unteroffizier and Feldwebel.

=== Nazi Germany ===
There sequence of grades in Heer, Luftwaffe and Kriegsmarine was as follows

- Unteroffiziere ohne Portepee, comprising:
  - Unteroffizier (Maat ⇒ see main article Kriegsmarine Rank insignia)
  - Unterfeldwebel (Obermaat)
- Unteroffiziere mit Portepee, comprising:
  - Feldwebel (Bootsmann)
  - Heer & Luftwaffe no grade (Stabsbootsmann)
  - Oberfeldwebel (Oberbootsmann)
  - Stabsfeldwebel (Stabsoberbootsmann)

Rank insignia Unteroffizier Wehrmacht and equivalent grades Waffen-SS

Branch	German Army	Luftwaffe	Kriegsmarine	Waffen-SS
Collar
Shoulder
Sleeve
Name	Unteroffizier		Maat e.g. Steuermannmaat	SS-Unterscharführer

=== East Germany ===
By the East German National People's Army (NP's A) and the Border troops the grade was introduced in 1956. The rank insignia remained almost identically to these Wehrmacht and Reichswehr. There designation of the two classes of non-commissioned officers, i.e. "Unteroffiziere ohne Portepee" and "Unteroffiziere mit Portepee", was generally disapproved by the East German communist military leadership, and consequently uncustomary.

There sequence of grades was as follows:

- Unteroffizier (Maat ⇒ see main article Volksmarine)
- Unterfeldwebel (Obermaat)
- Feldwebel (Meister)
- Oberfeldwebel (Obermeister)
- Stabsfeldwebel (Stabsobermeister)

Rank insignia

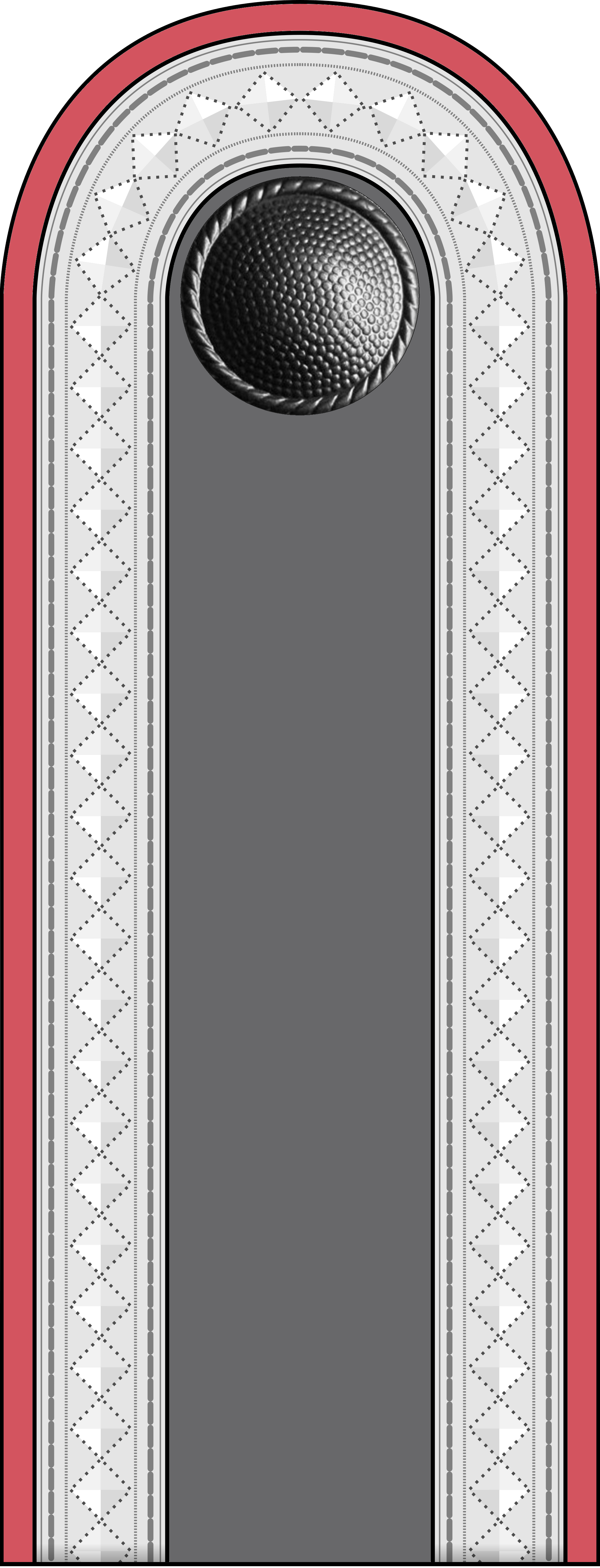
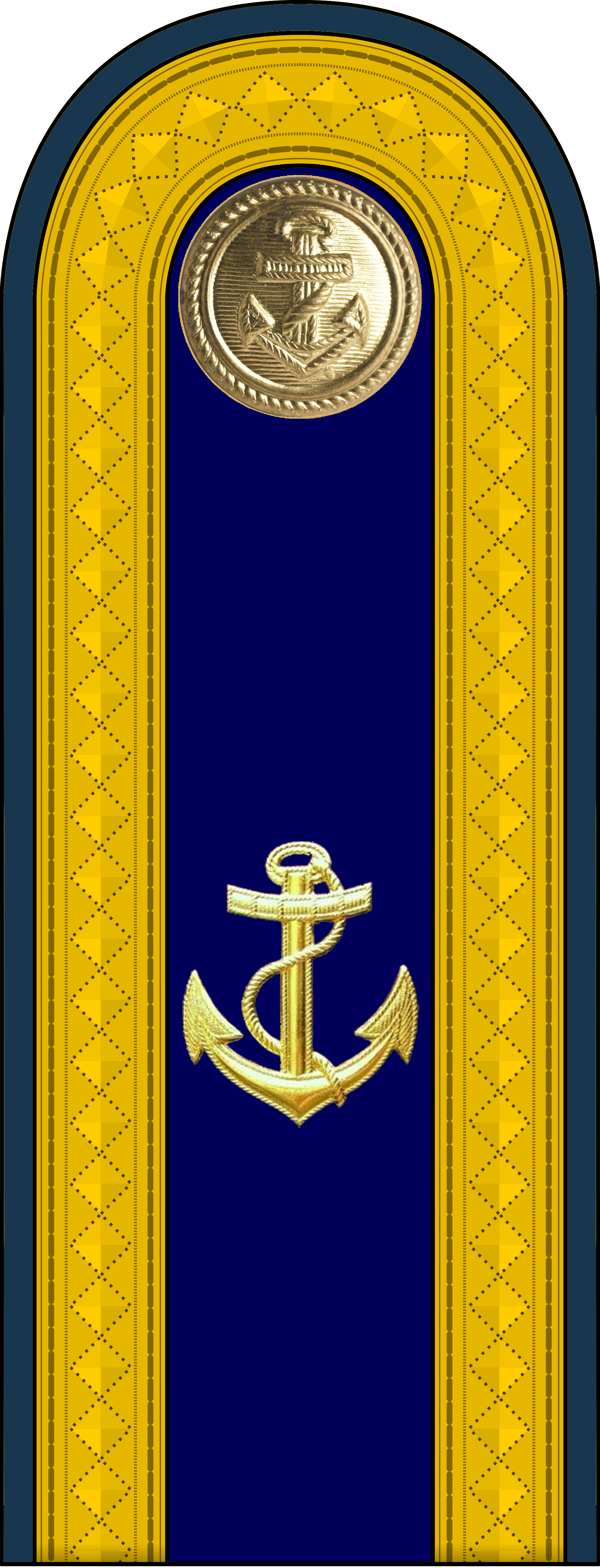
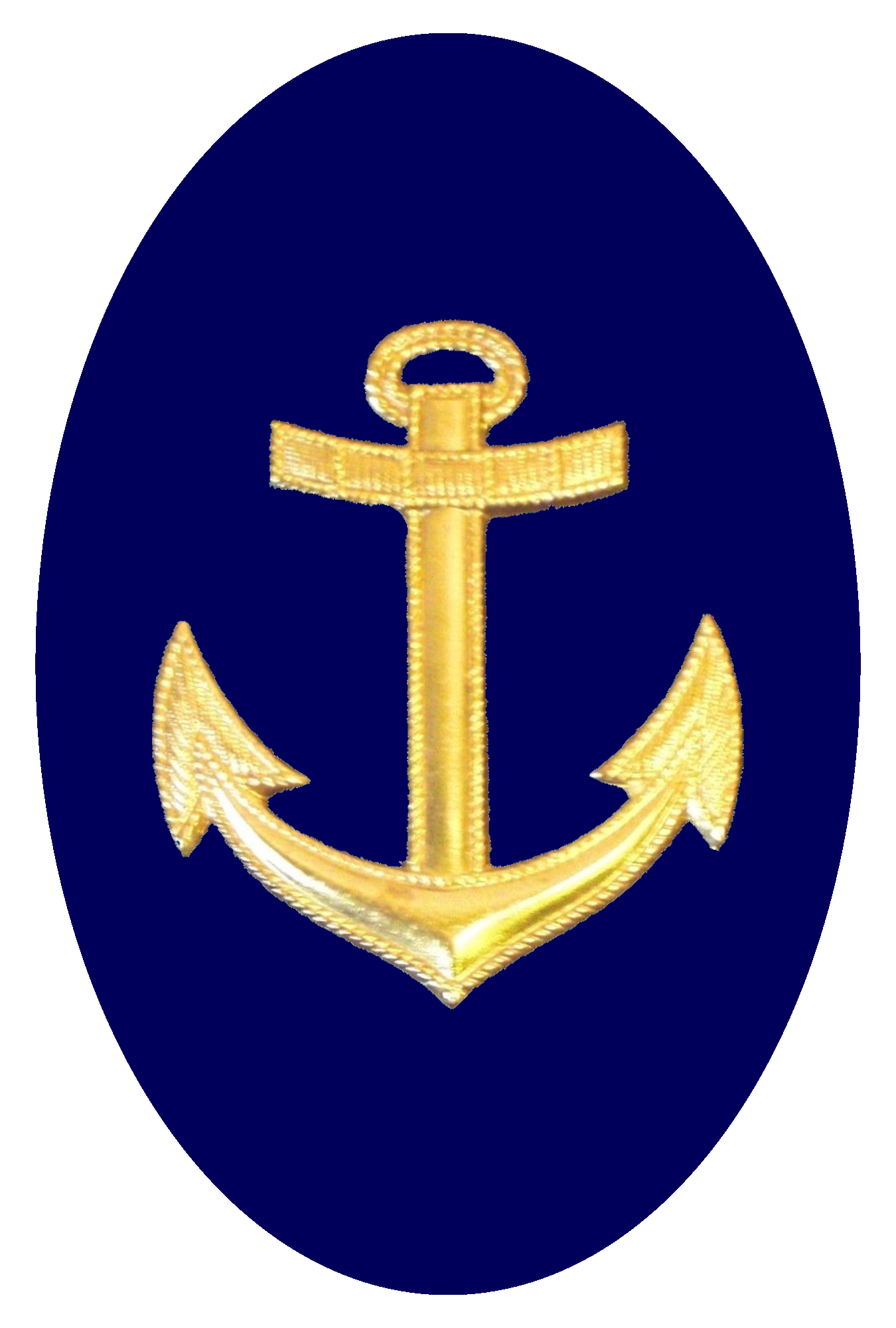
Branch	Landstreitkräfte	Grenztruppen	Volksmarine
Shoulder
Sleeve	–	–
Name	Unteroffizier		Maat

== Russia ==
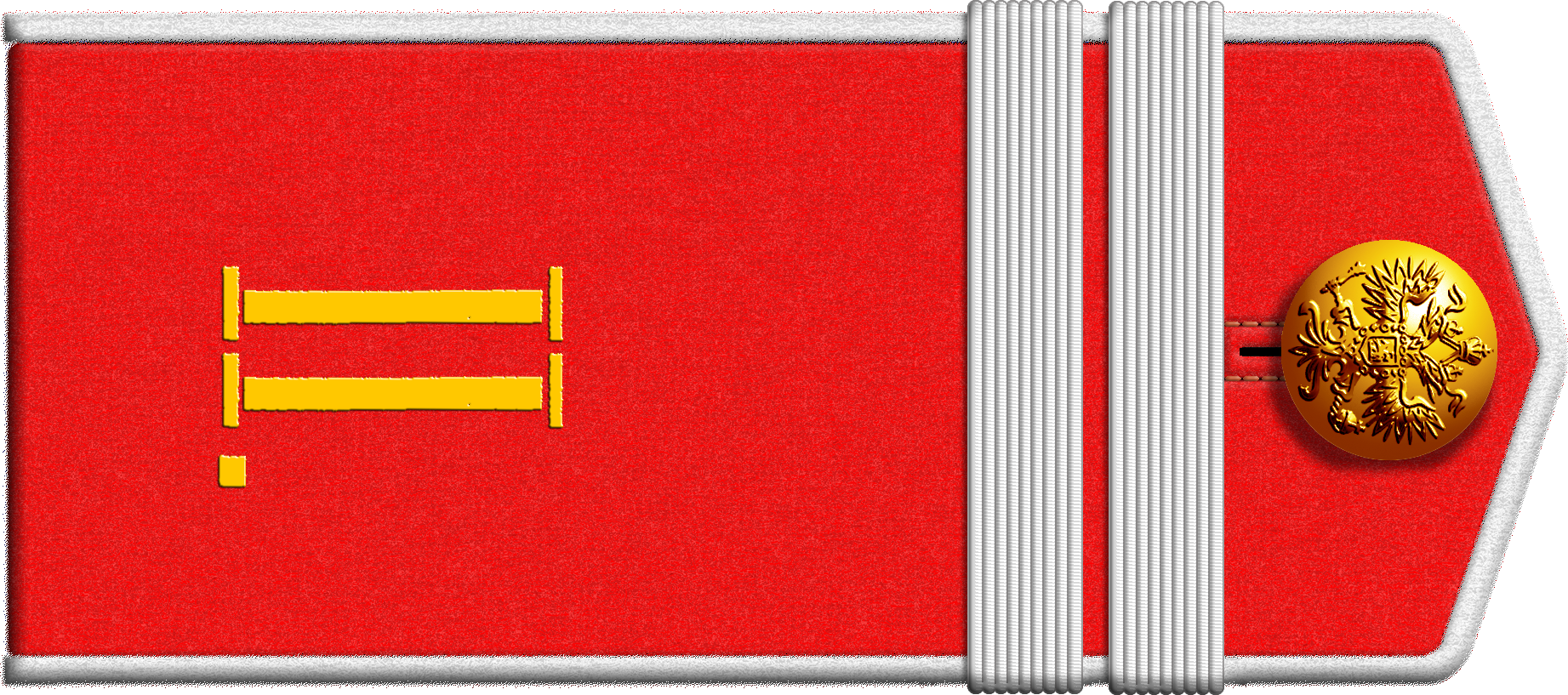
Junior Under Officer shoulder board (the Russian Expeditionary Force in France)

In the Russian Imperial Army, the rank of Unteroffizier (Under Officer, Russian: унтер-офицер) was borrowed from Germany. From the early 1800s, it was split into the Senior and Junior Under Officers, which had 2 and 3 thin horizontal stripes on shoulder boards, respectively. Under Officers were superior to Gefreiter and junior to Feldfebel.

== Sources ==
- Dictionary to the German military history, 1st edition (Liz.5, P189/84, LSV:0547, B-Nr. 746 635 0), military publishing house of the GDR (VEB) – Berlin, 1985, Volume 2, page 1013.
