= Unterfeldwebel =

German military rank

Unterfeldwebel (lit. 'Junior Sergeant') was a rank of the Wehrmacht from 1935 until 1945. It was also used in the East German National People's Army from 1956 to 1990. The equivalent to Unterfeldwebel in the Bundeswehr of West Germany and later the Federal Republic of Germany is the rank Stabsunteroffizier (OR-5).

== History ==
Unterfeldwebel (in Cavalry, Artillery, and Armoured corps: Unterwachtmeister) was in Germany the designation to a person in uniform with the second lowest NCO-rank (after Unteroffizier). It was counted to the rank-group Unteroffiziere ohne Portepee.

The rank-designations Unterfeldwebel, respectively Unterfeldwebel were created by renaming of the Sergeant rank of the Imperial German Army

Independent to the military assignment an Unteroffizier could be promoted to Unterfeldwebel after a service time of three to four years. Since 1936 this rank could normally be skipped in Heer and Luftwaffe, and NCOs with the rank Unteroffizier were promoted to Feldwebel.

=== Rank designation of German forces until 1945 ===
Branch	German Army	Luftwaffe	Kriegsmarine	Waffen-SS
Collar
Shoulder
Sleeve
Name	Unterfeldwebel		Obermaat	SS-Scharführer

Junior rank Unteroffizier	(Wehrmacht ranks); Unterfeldwebel	Senior rank Feldwebel

=== Nationale People's Army ===
Unterfeldwebel/Obermaat

Border troops

Volksmarine

By the GDR National People's Army and the Border Troops the rank was introduced in 1962, comparable to NATO OR-6a. The rank insignia remained almost identically to these Wehrmacht and Reichswehr.

Junior rank Unteroffizier	(NPA ranks); Unterfeldwebel (Obermaat)	Senior rank Feldwebel

== Sources ==
- Dictionary to the German military history, 1st edition (Liz.5, P189/84, LSV:0547, B-Nr. 746 635 0), military publishing house of the GDR (VEB) – Berlin, 1985, Volume 2, page 1013.
