= Comparative officer ranks of World War I =

The following table shows comparative officer ranks of several Allied and Central powers during World War I.

== Table ==
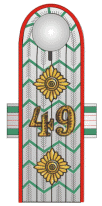
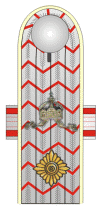
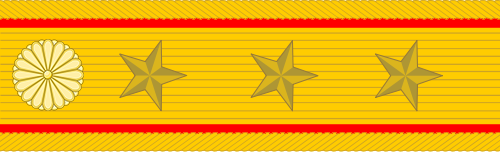
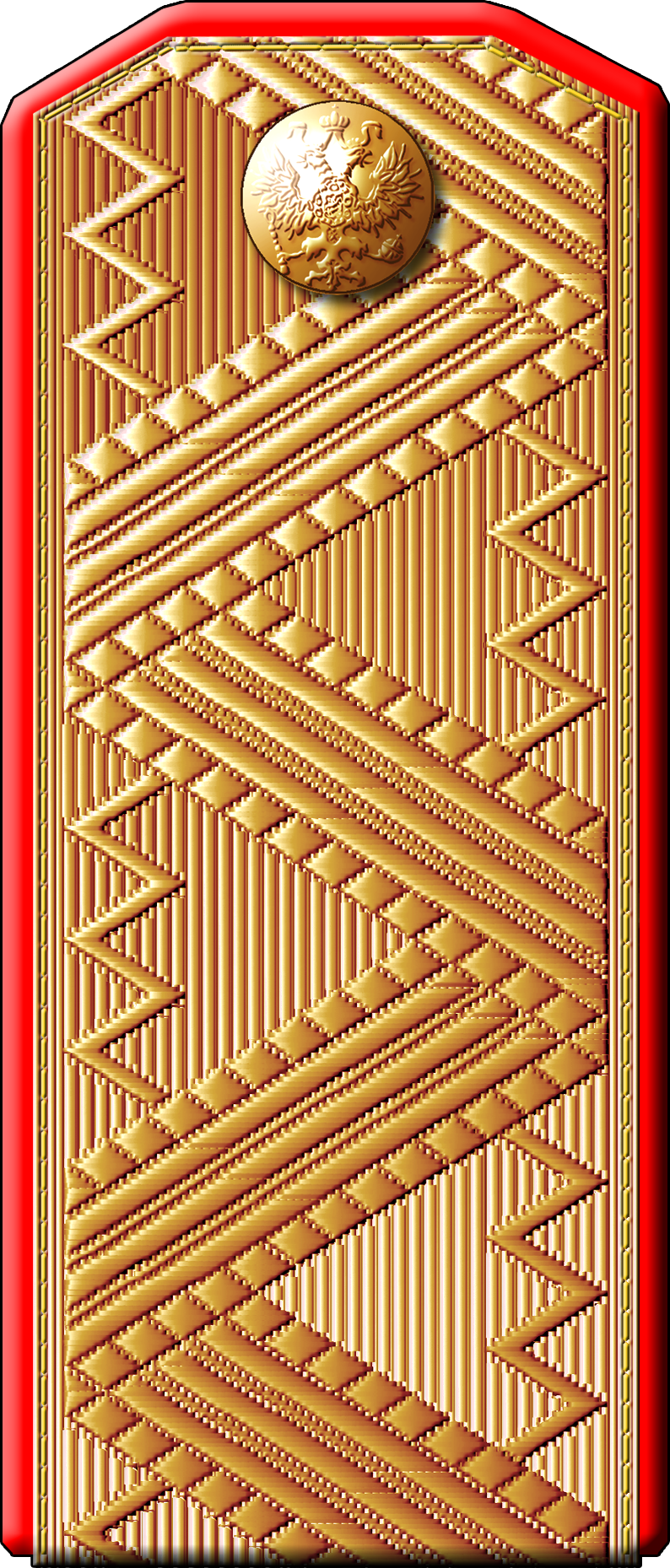
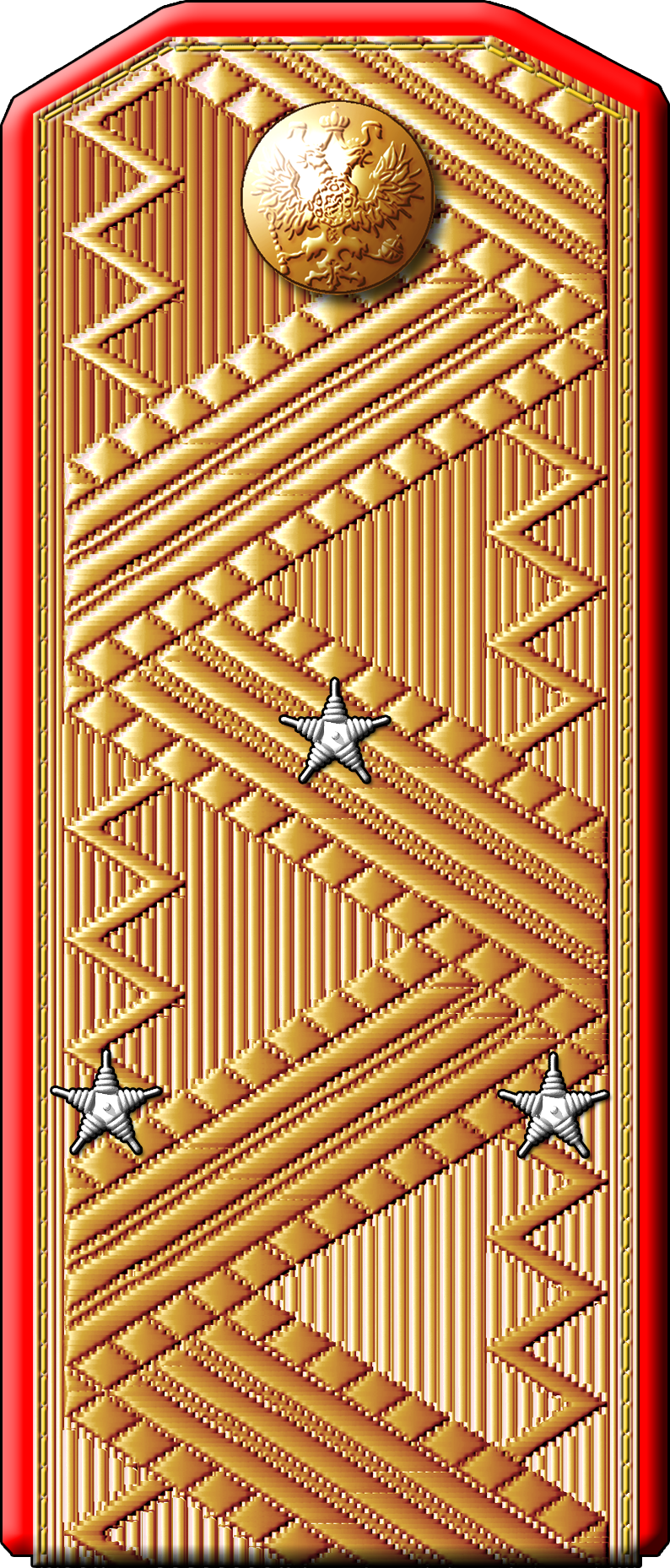
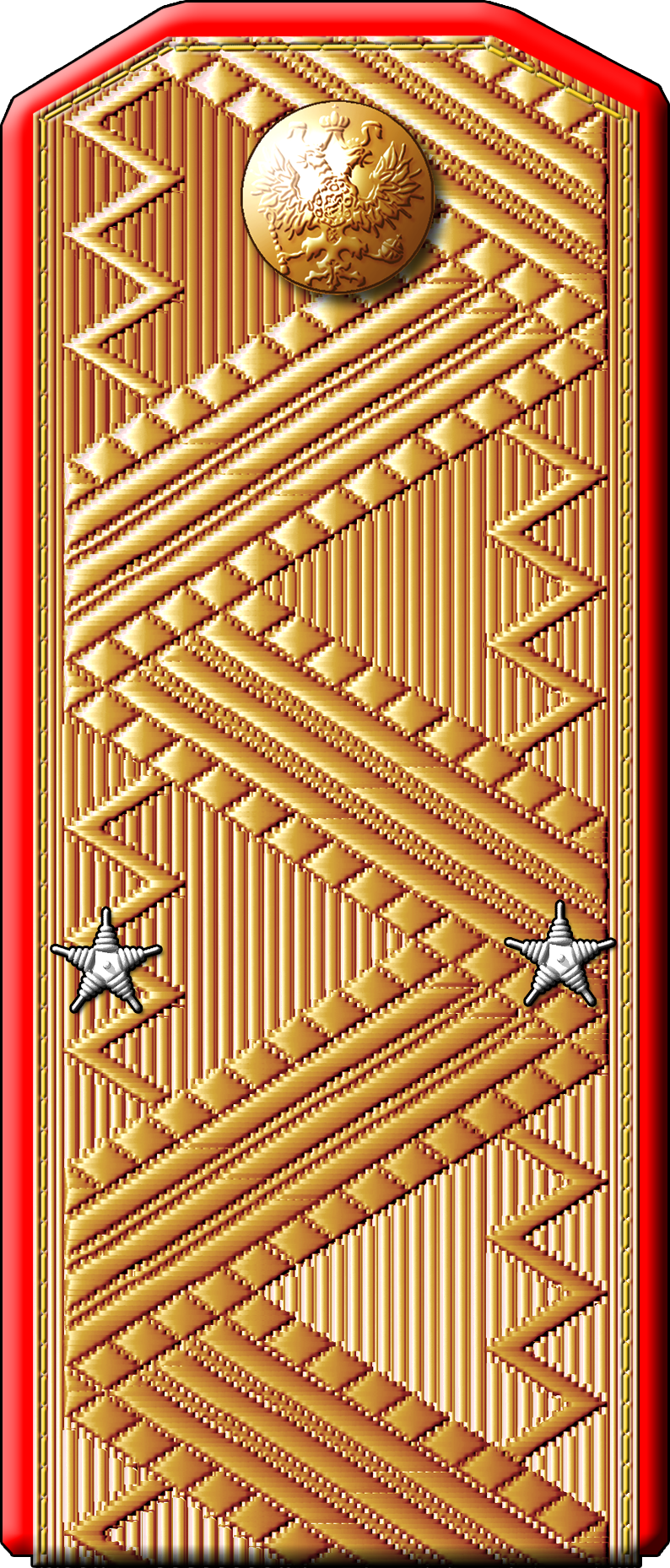
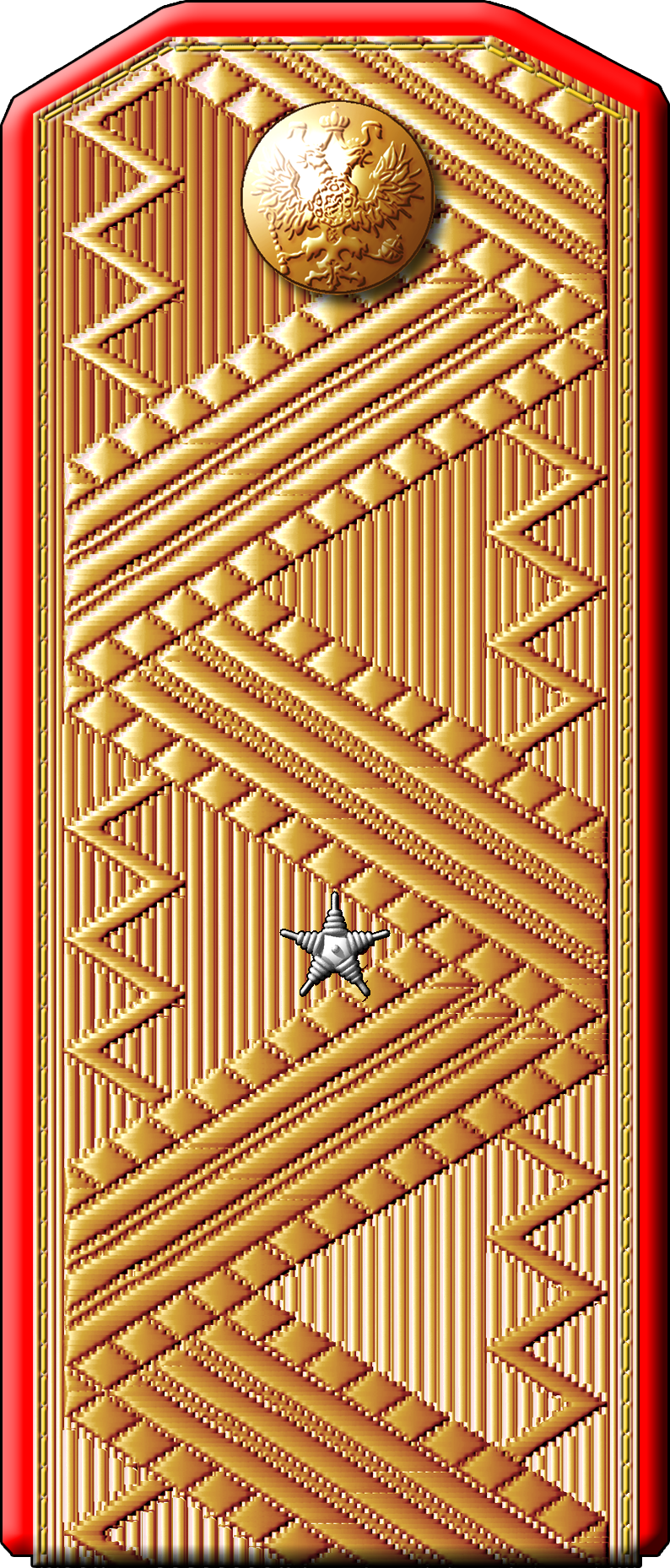
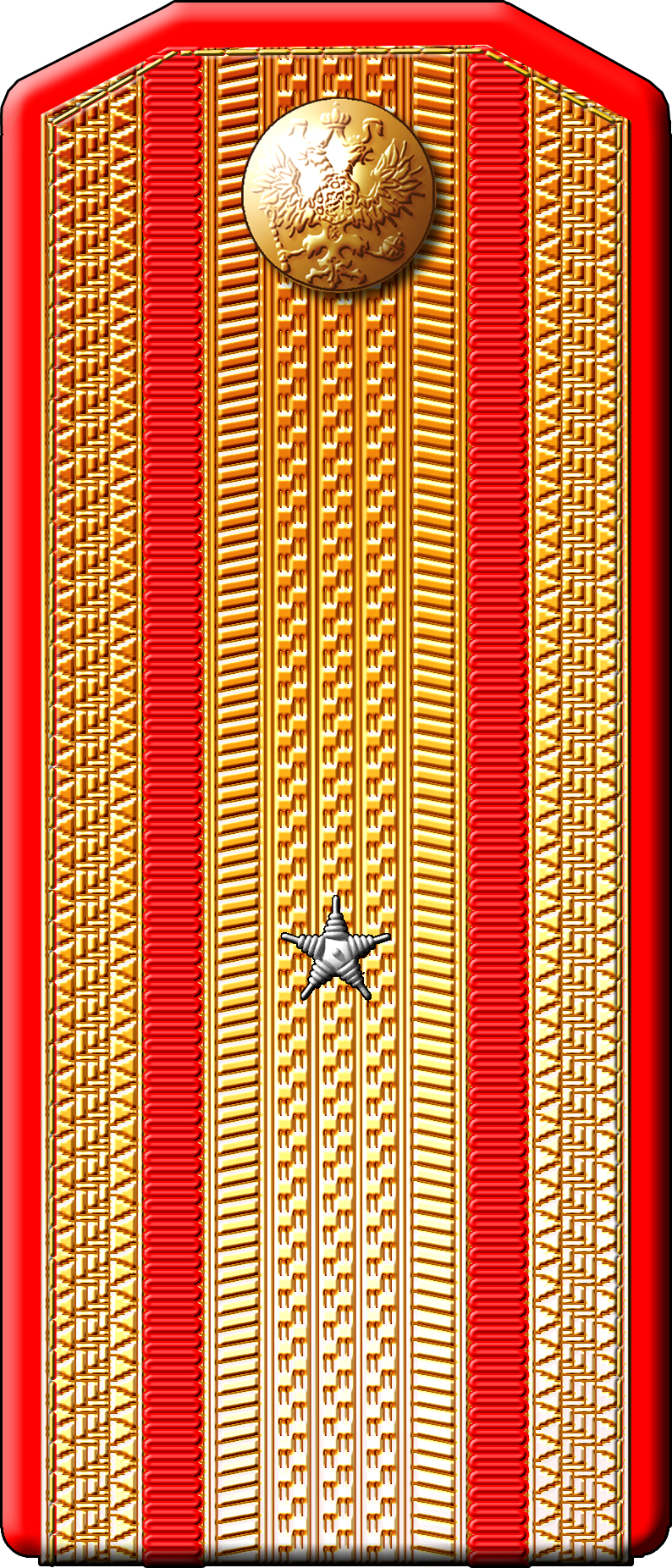
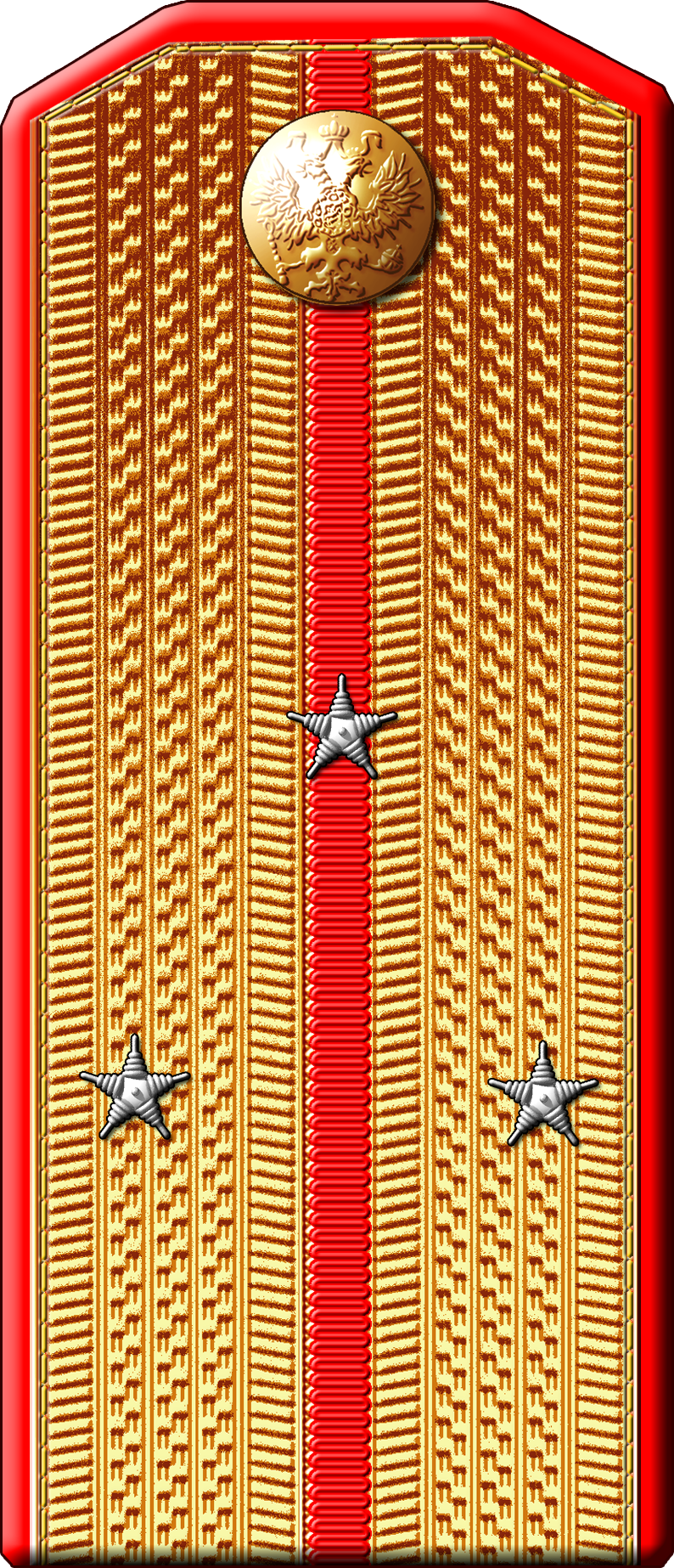
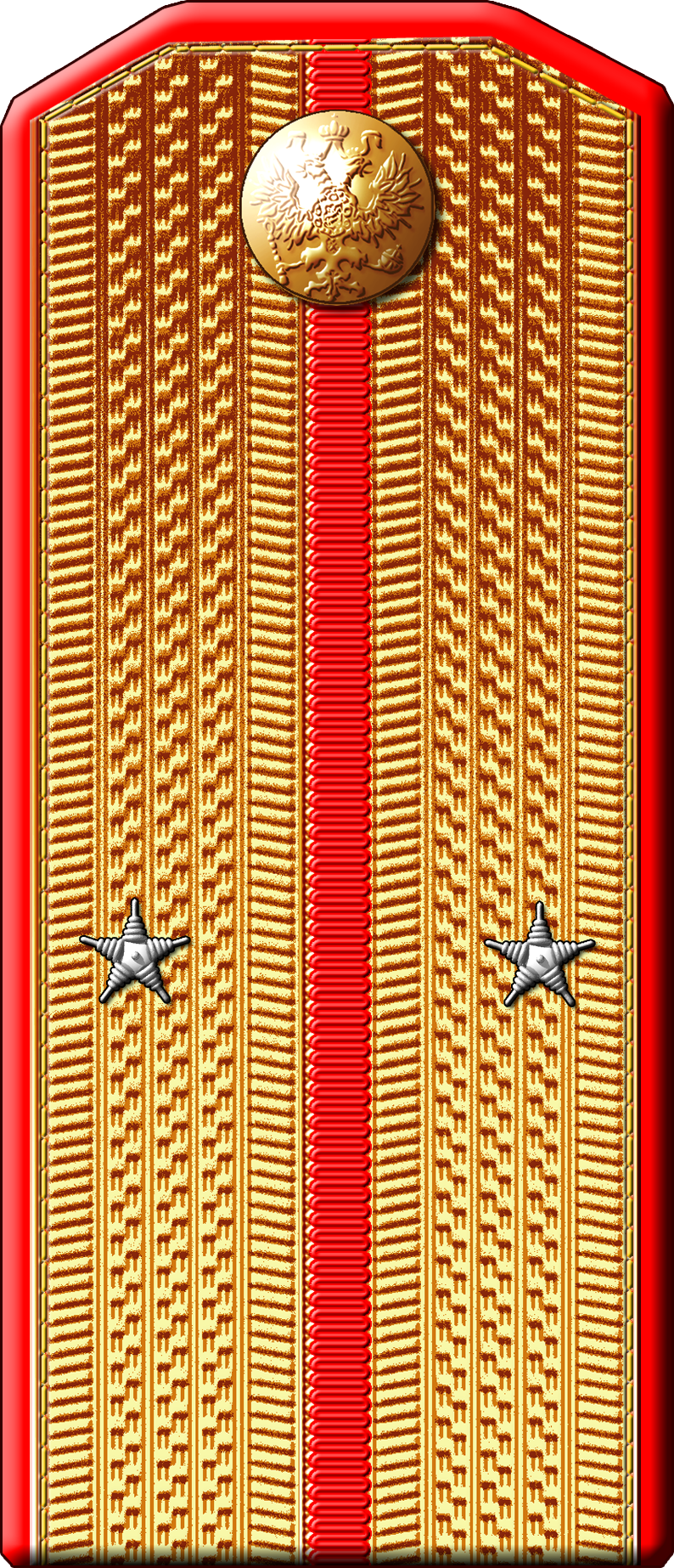
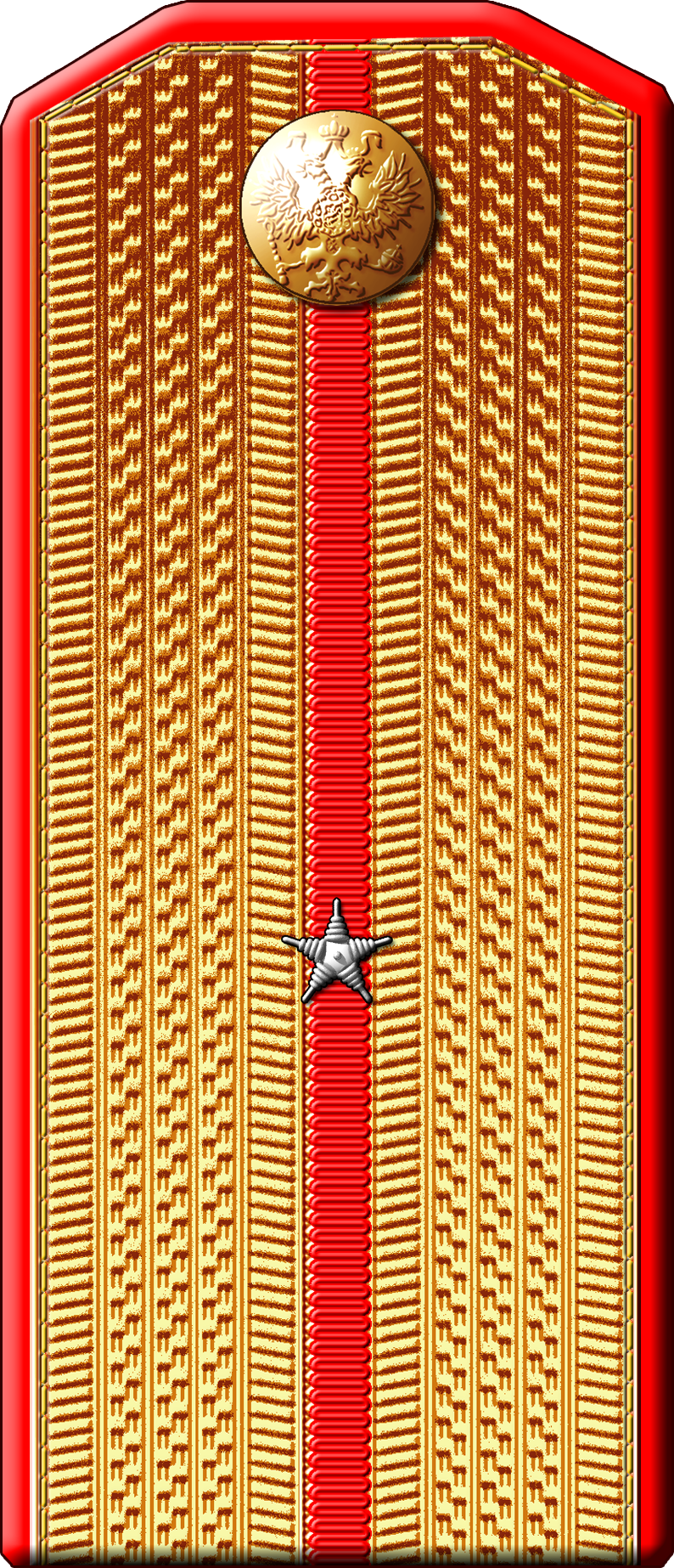
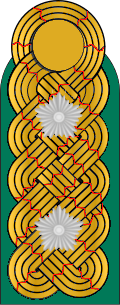
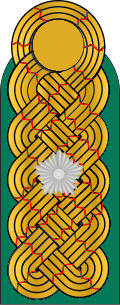
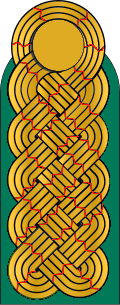
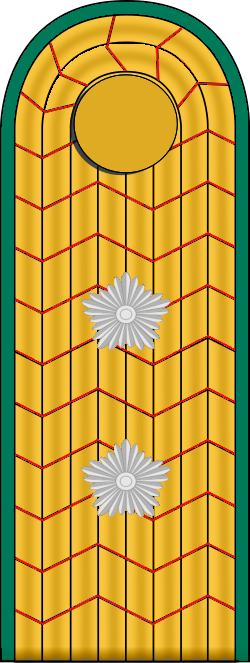
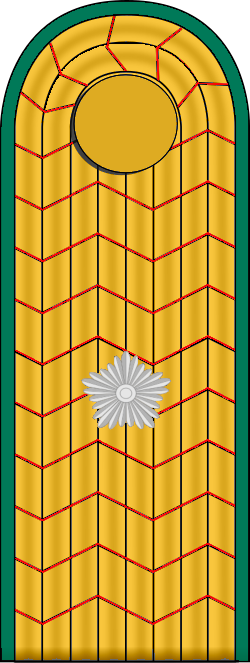
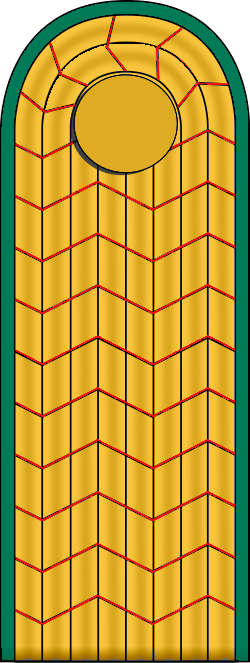
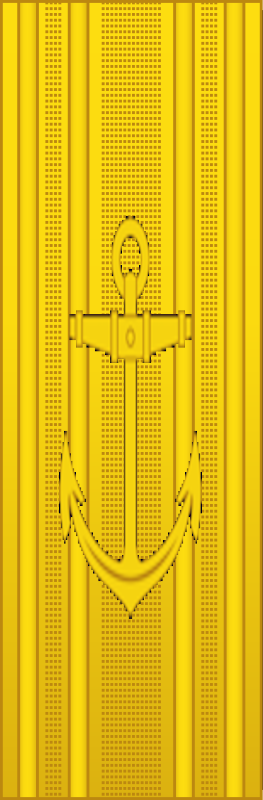
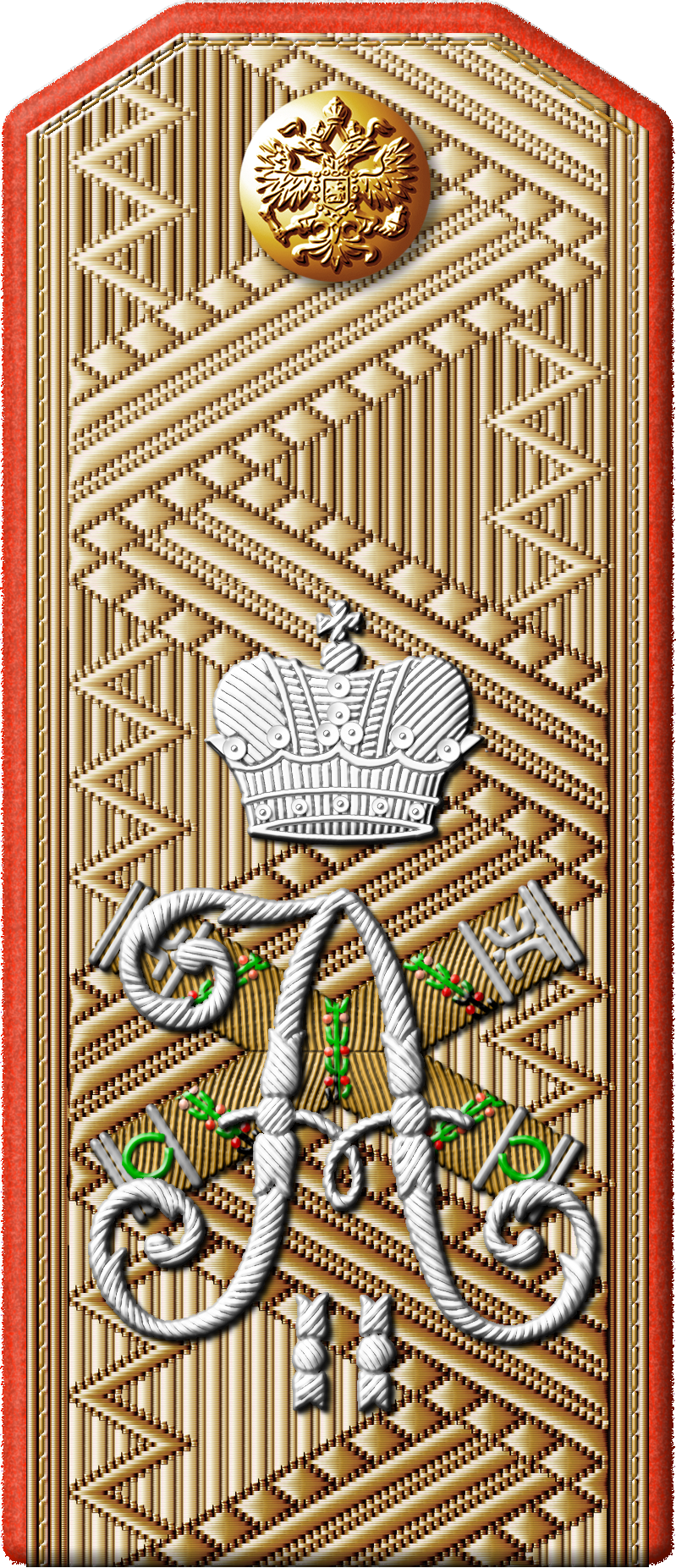
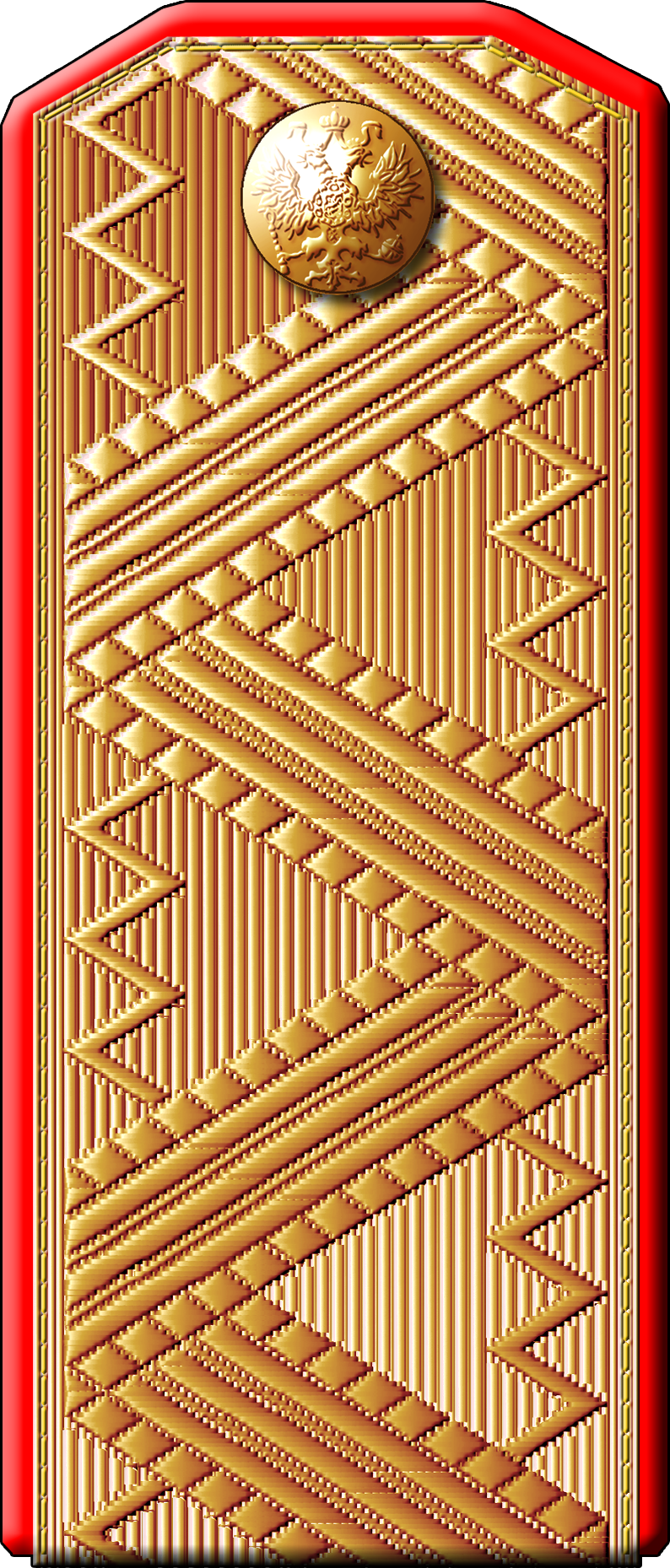
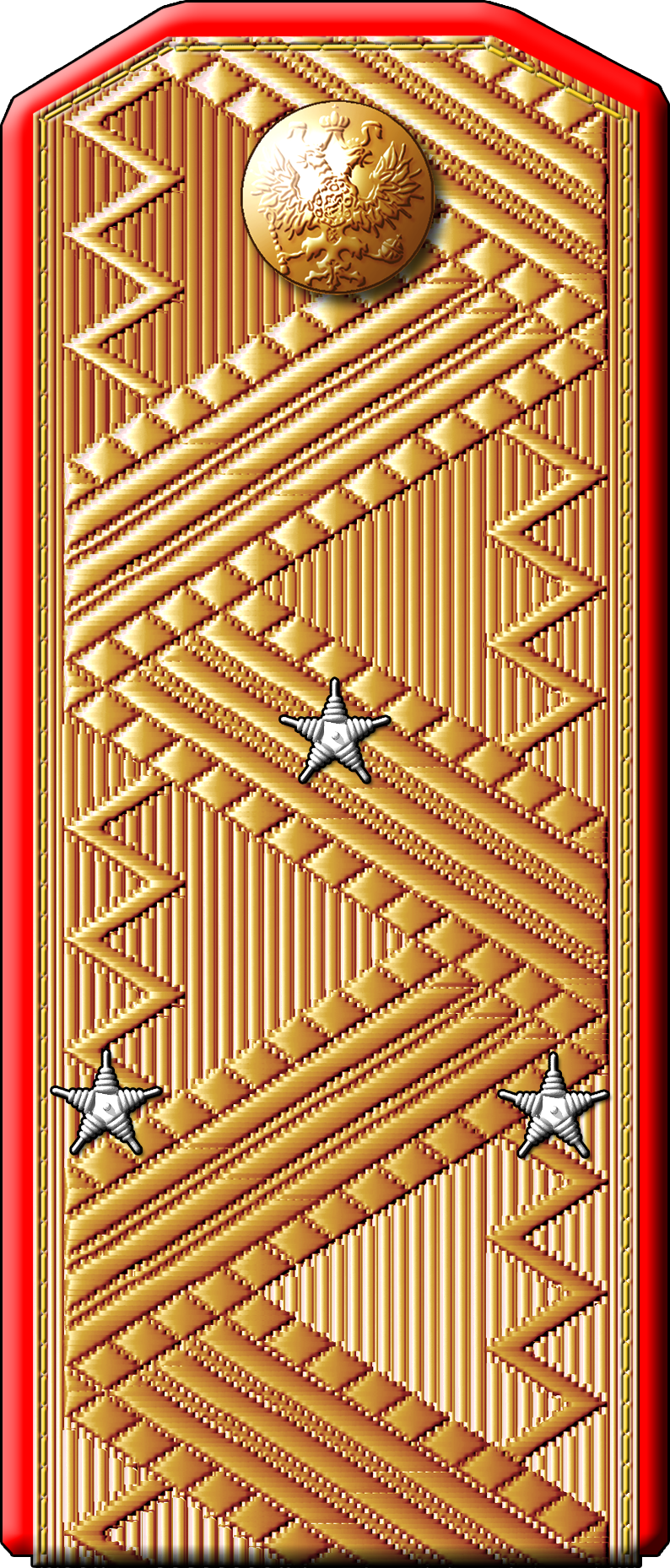
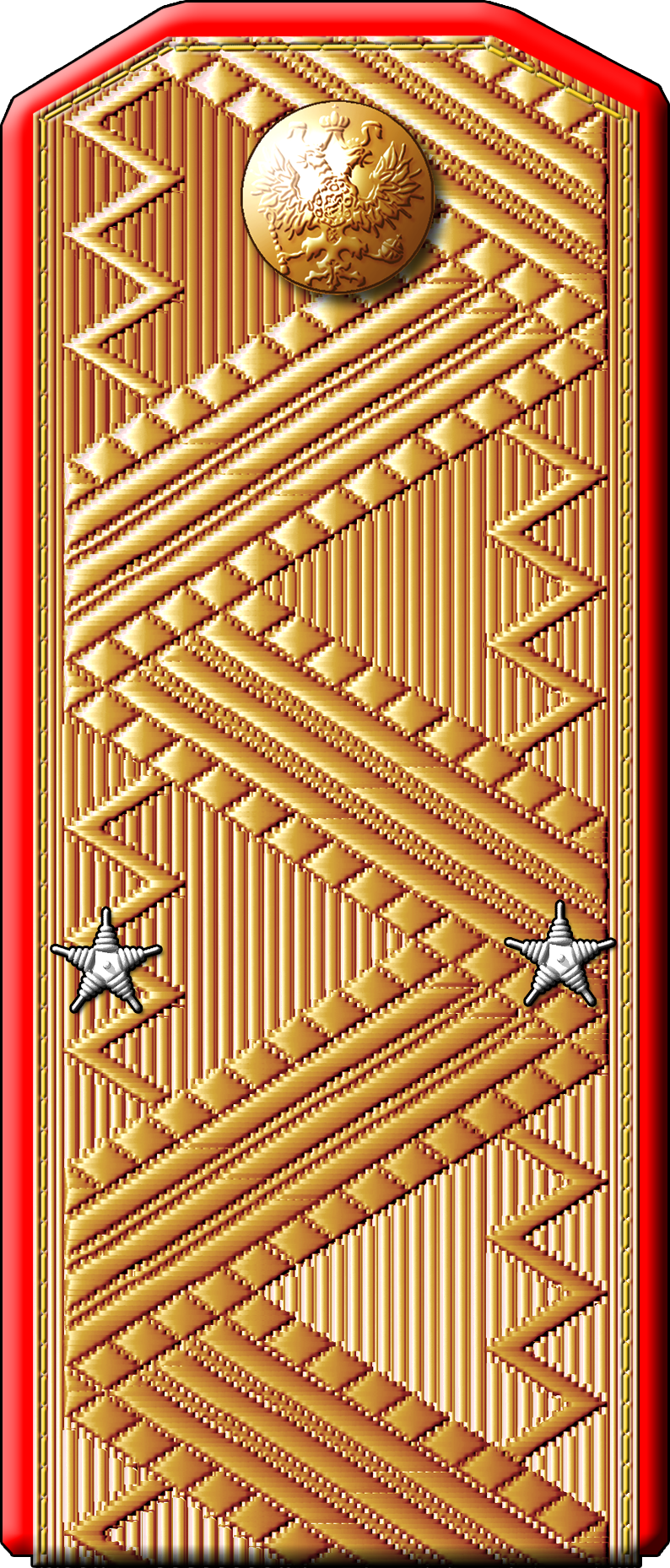
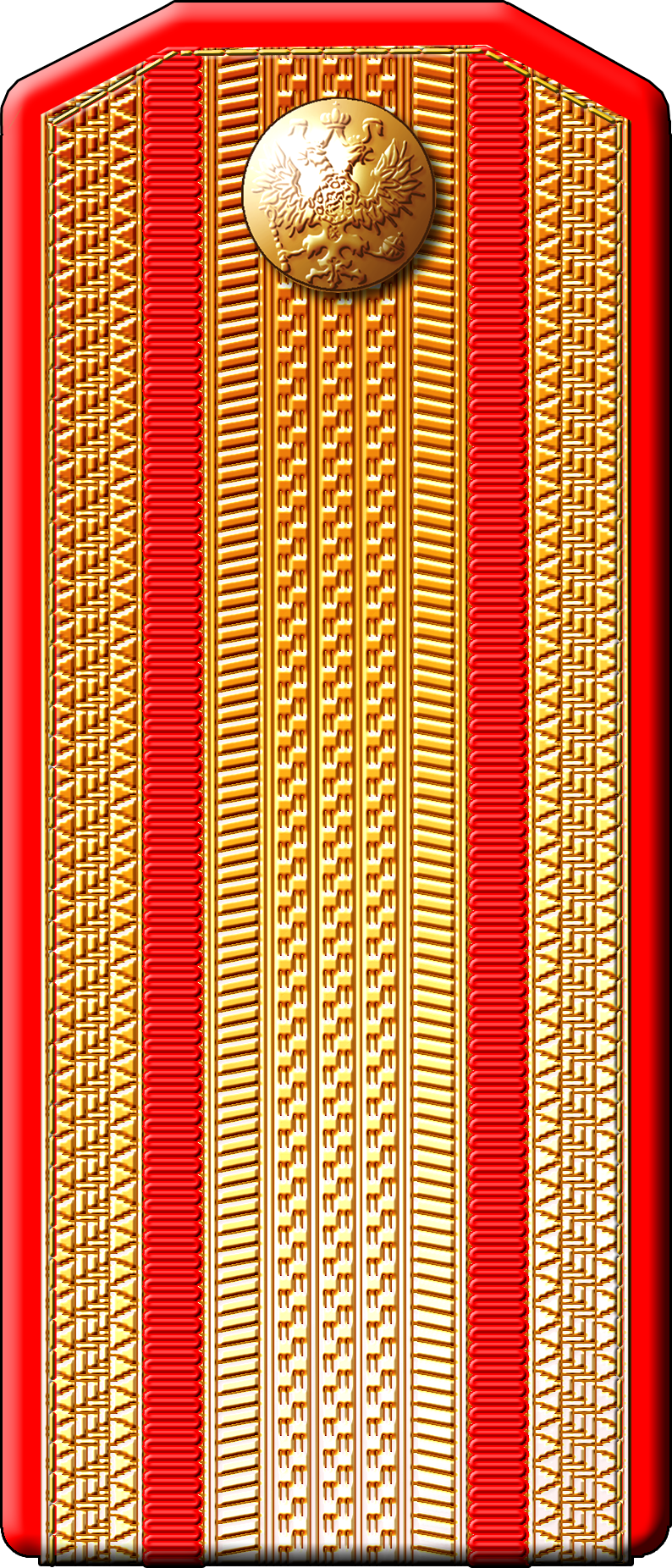
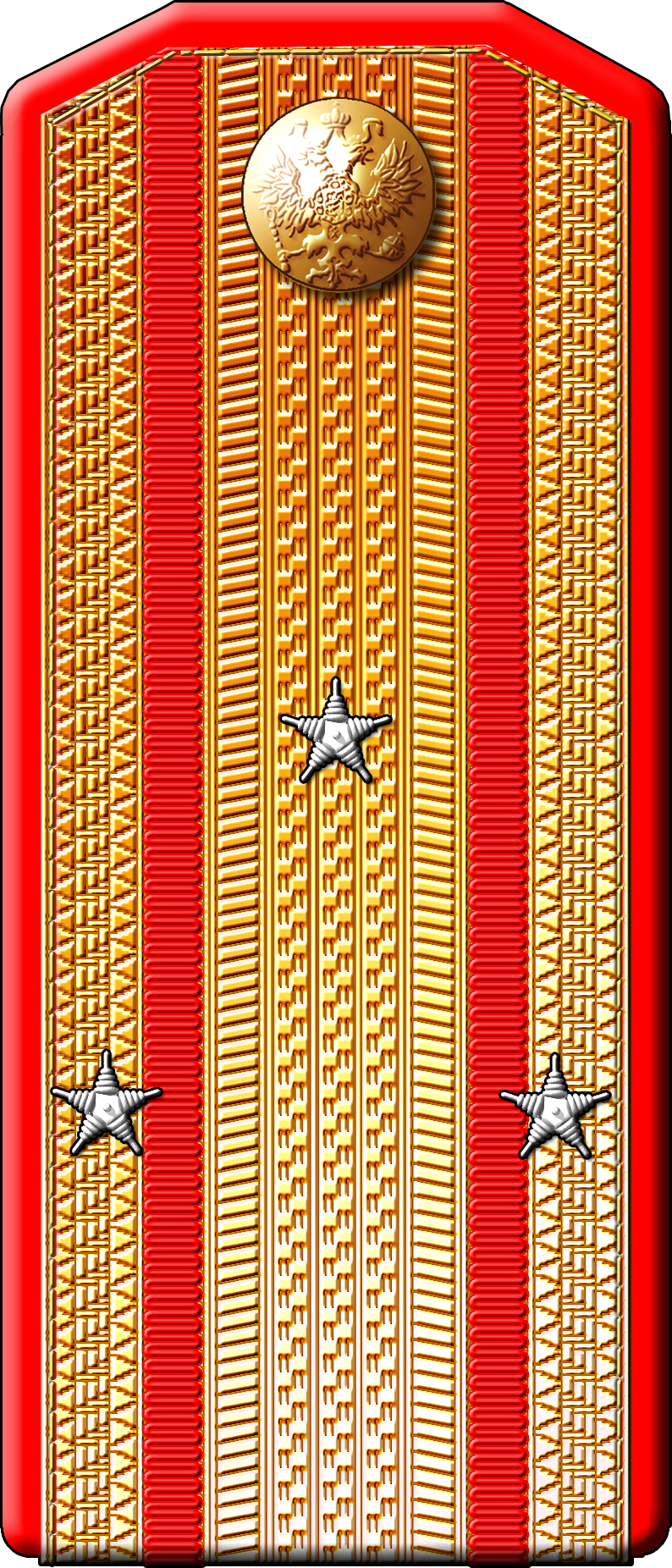
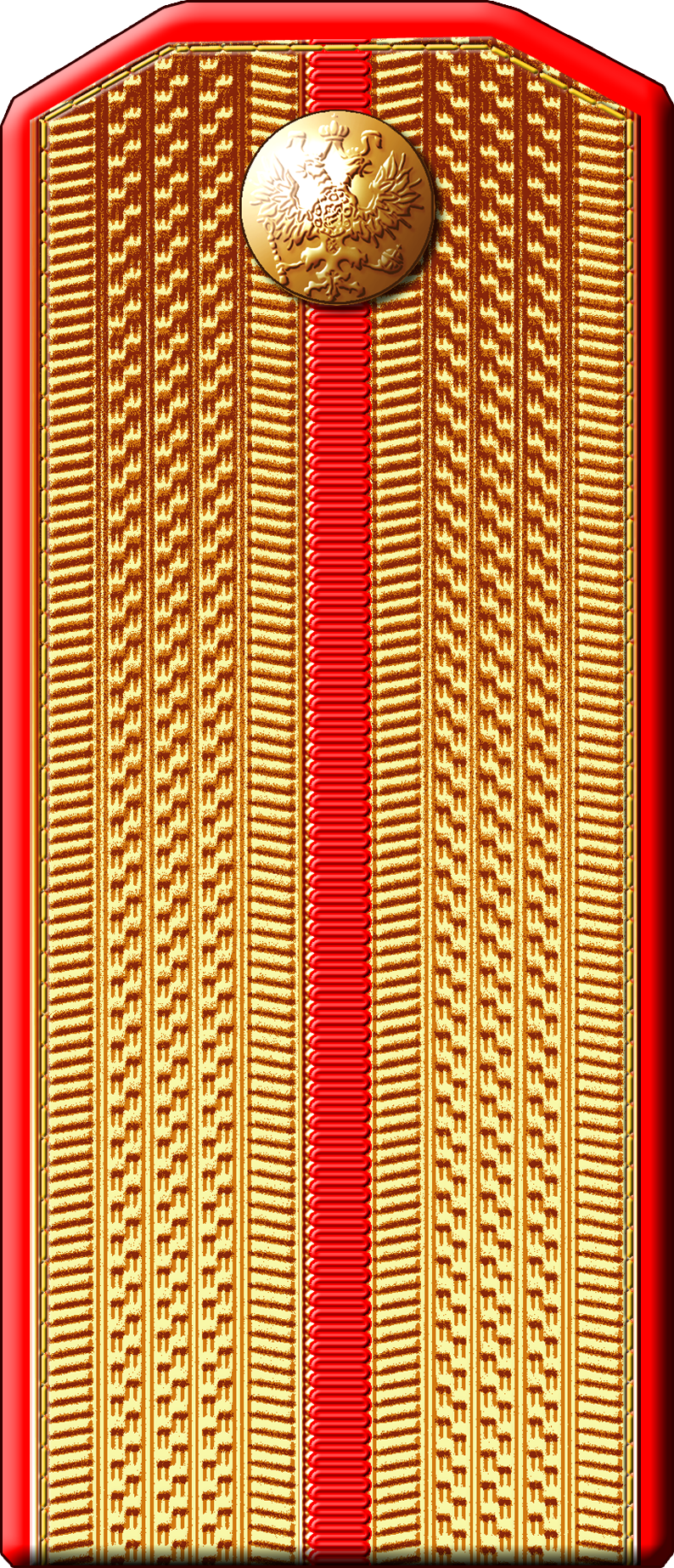
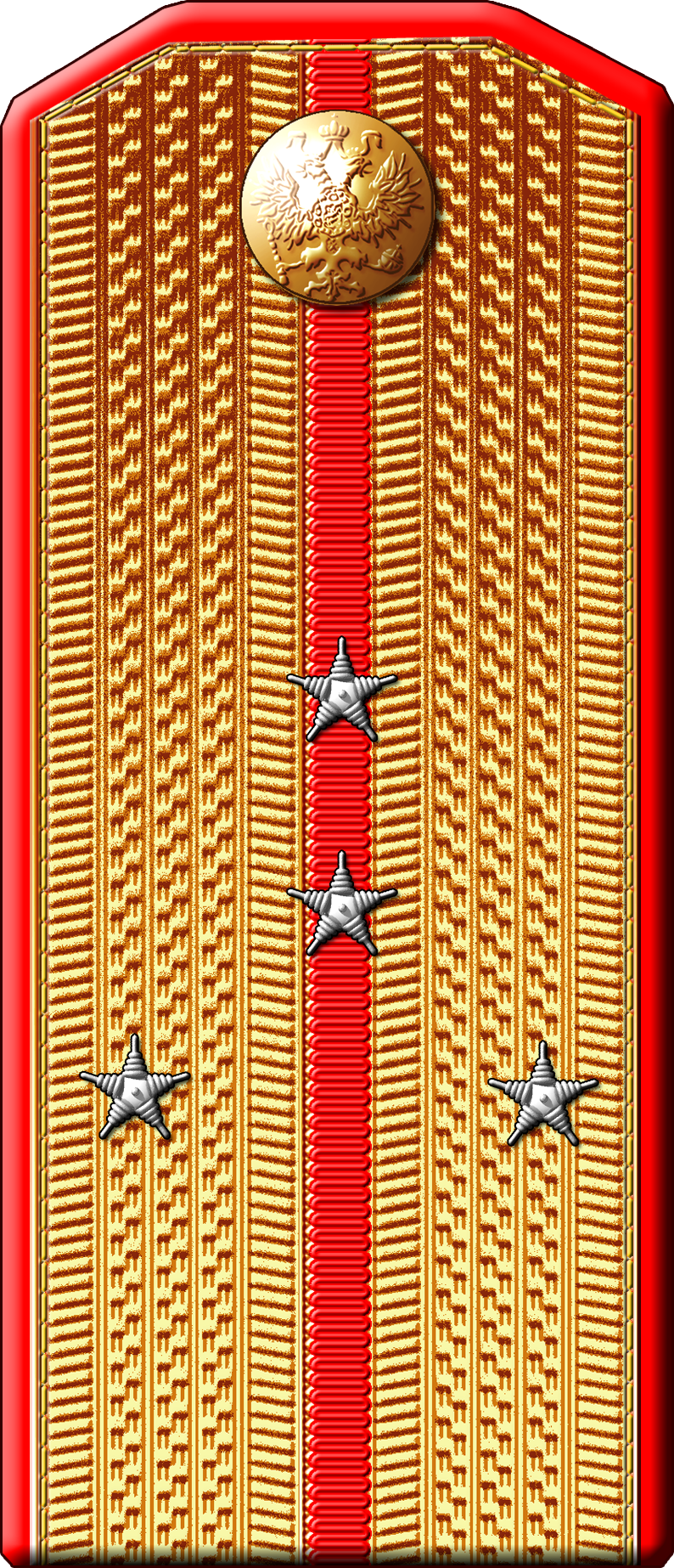
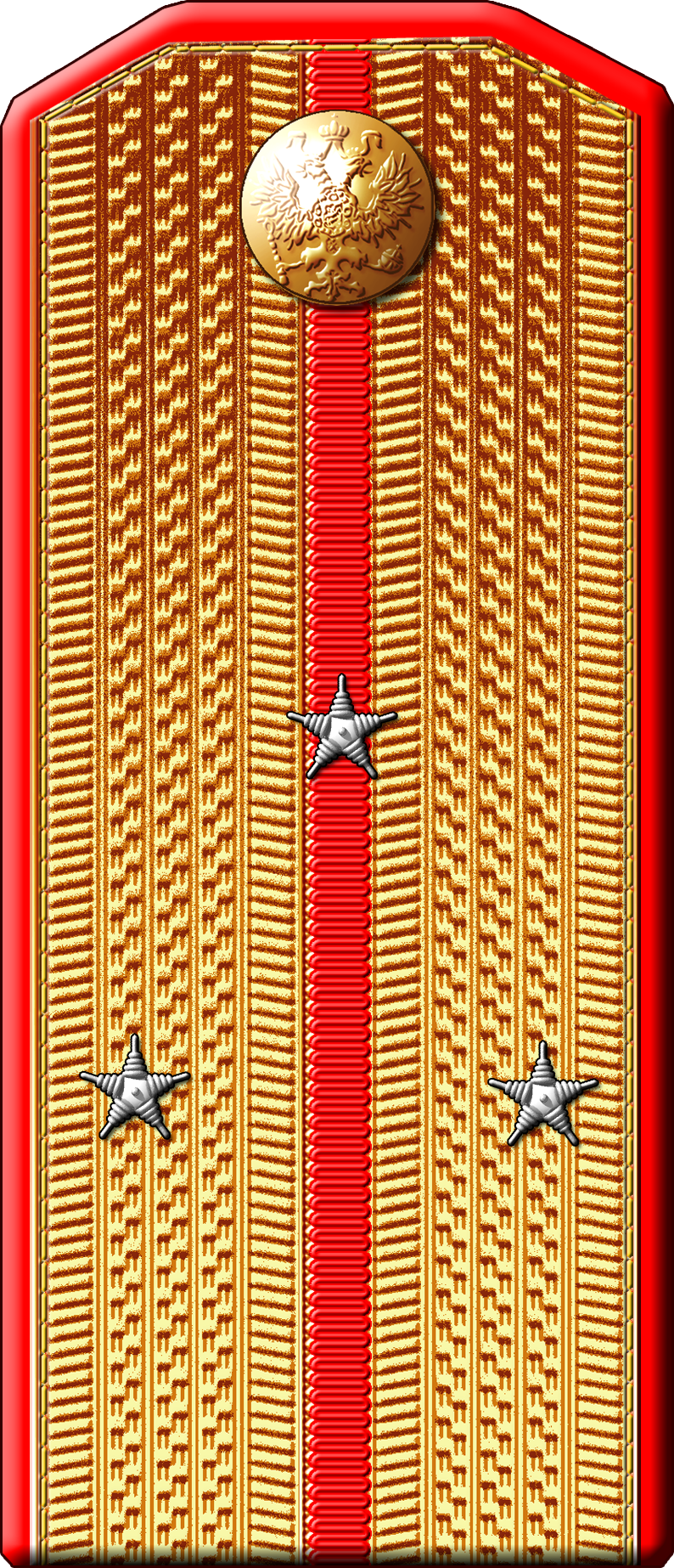
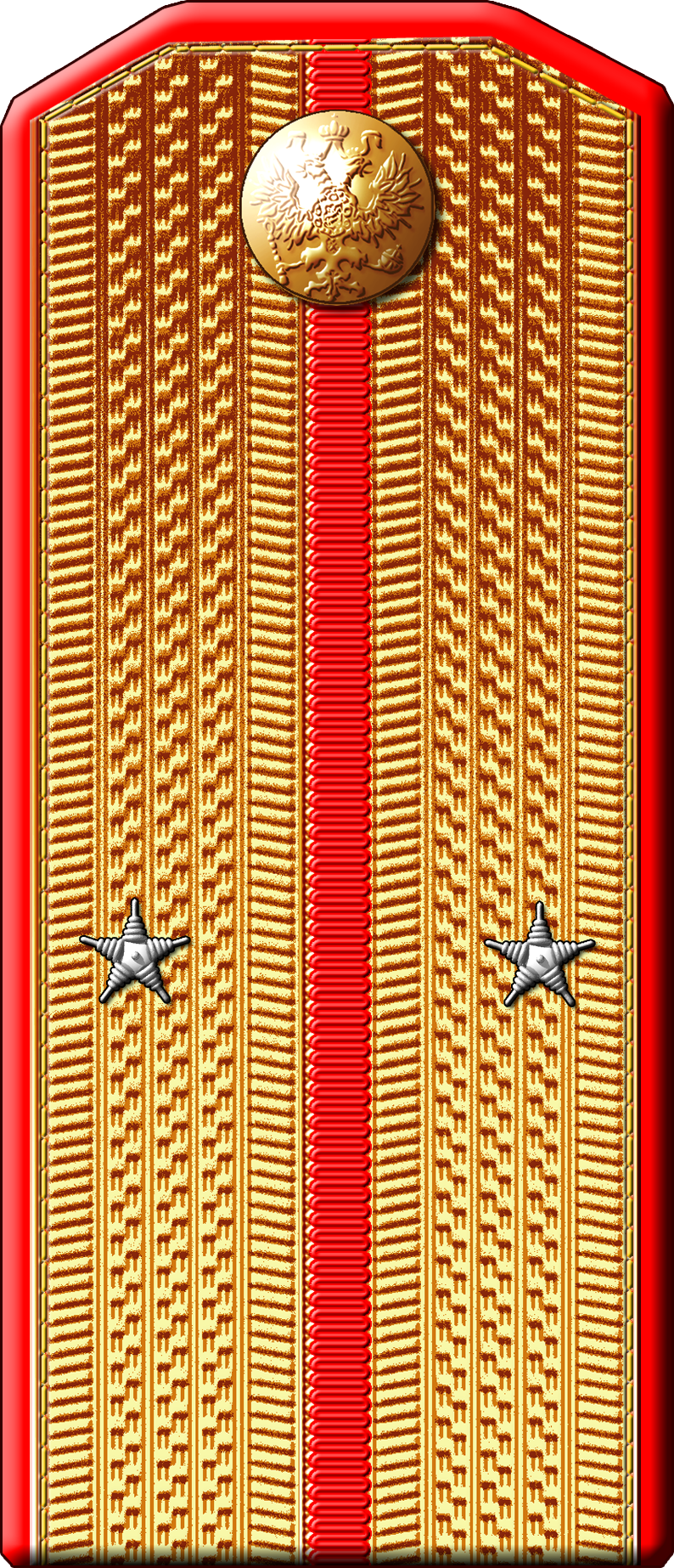
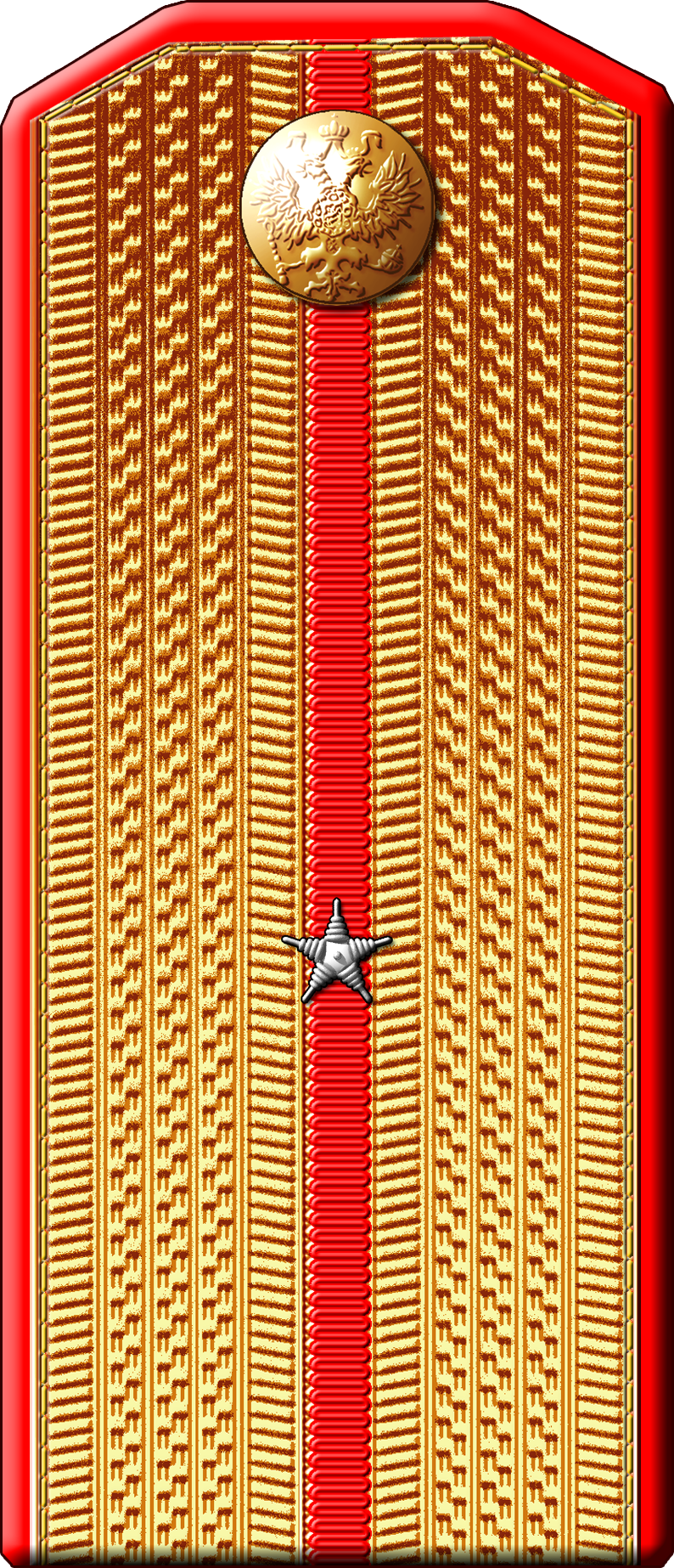
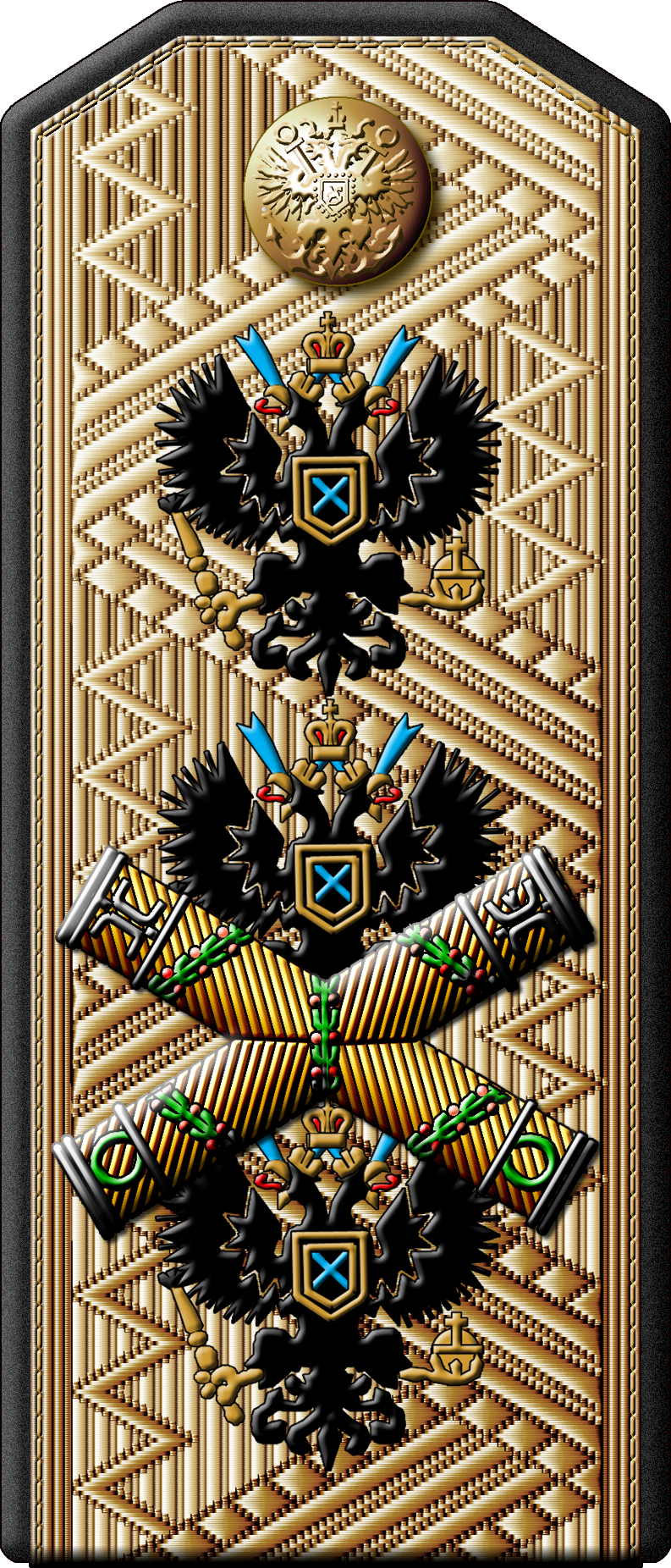
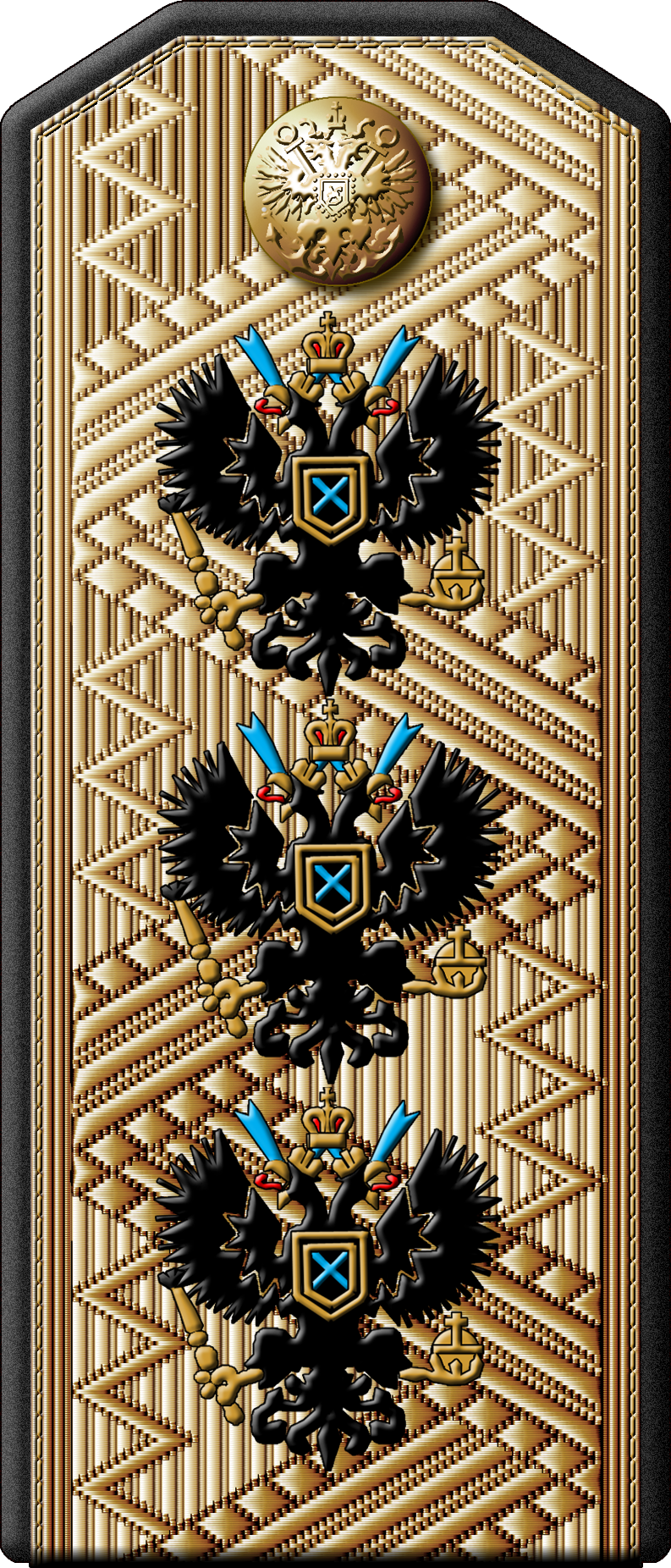
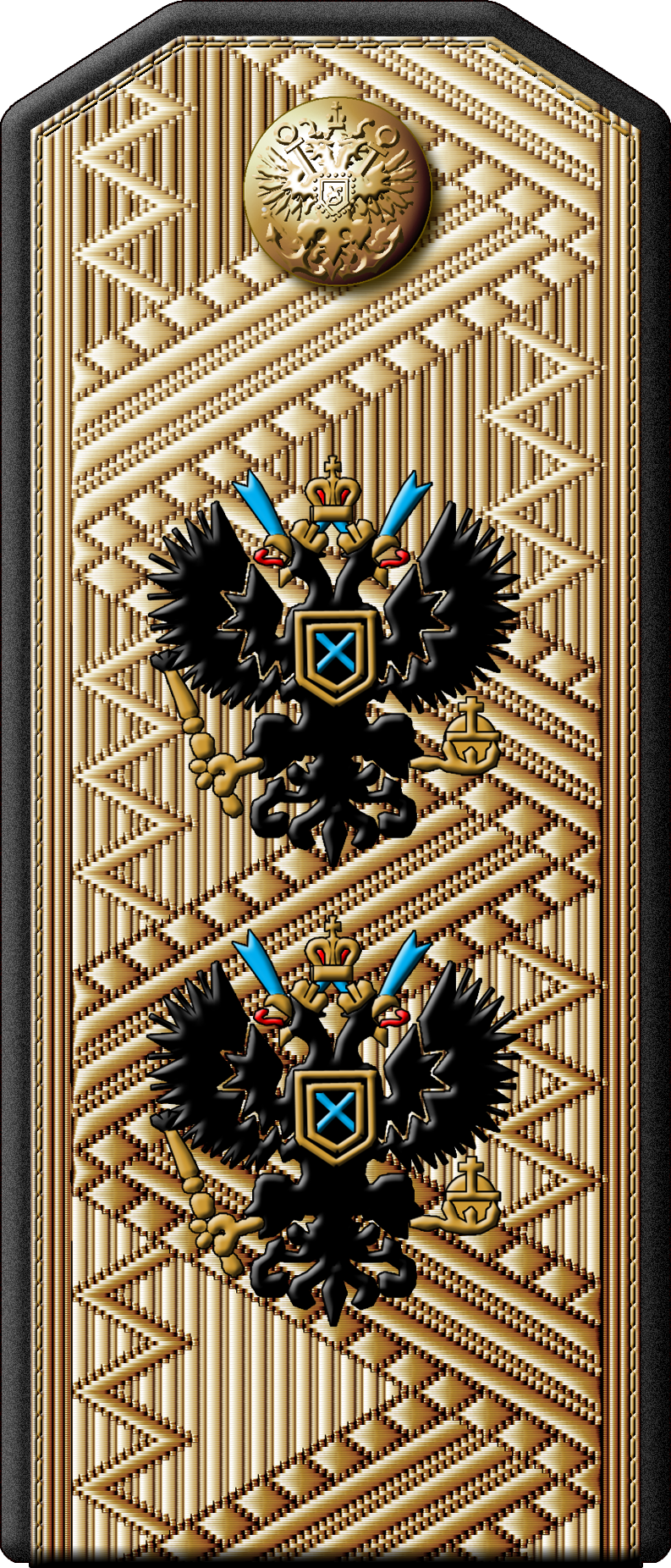
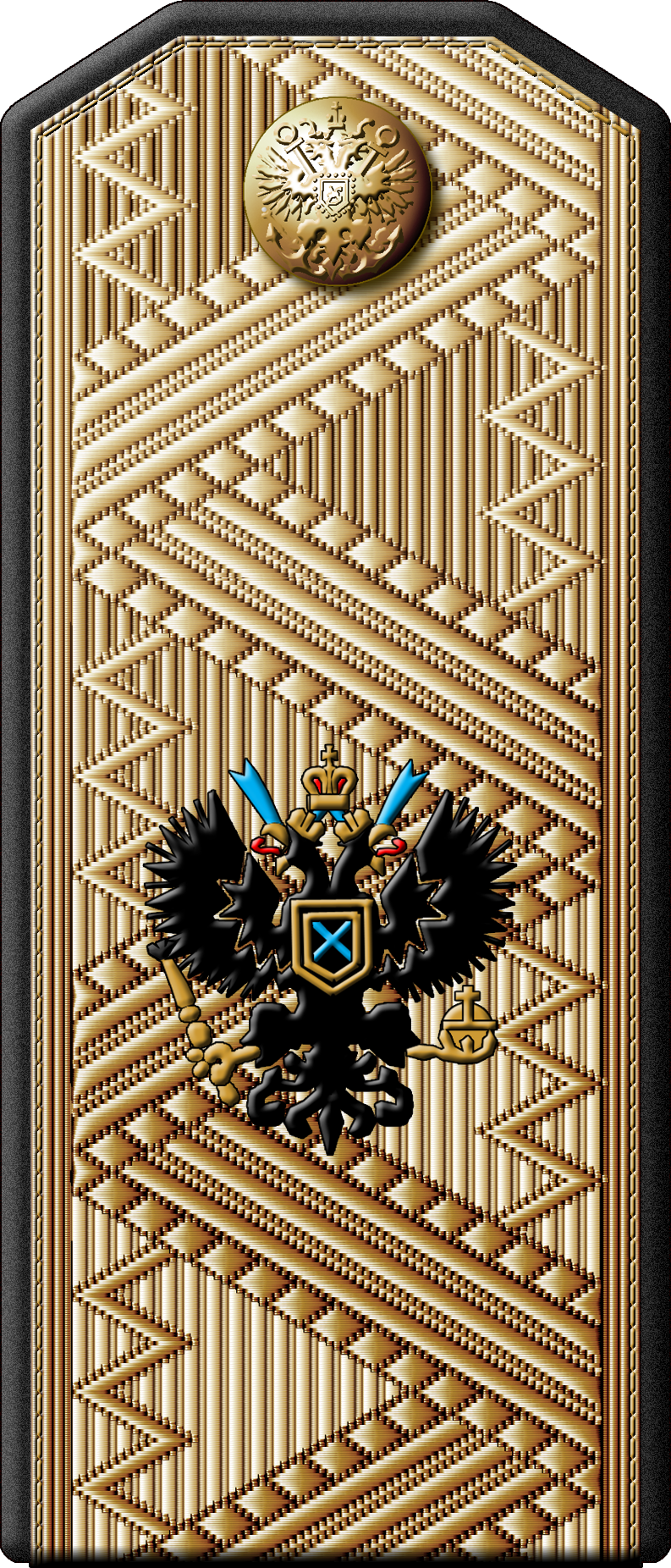
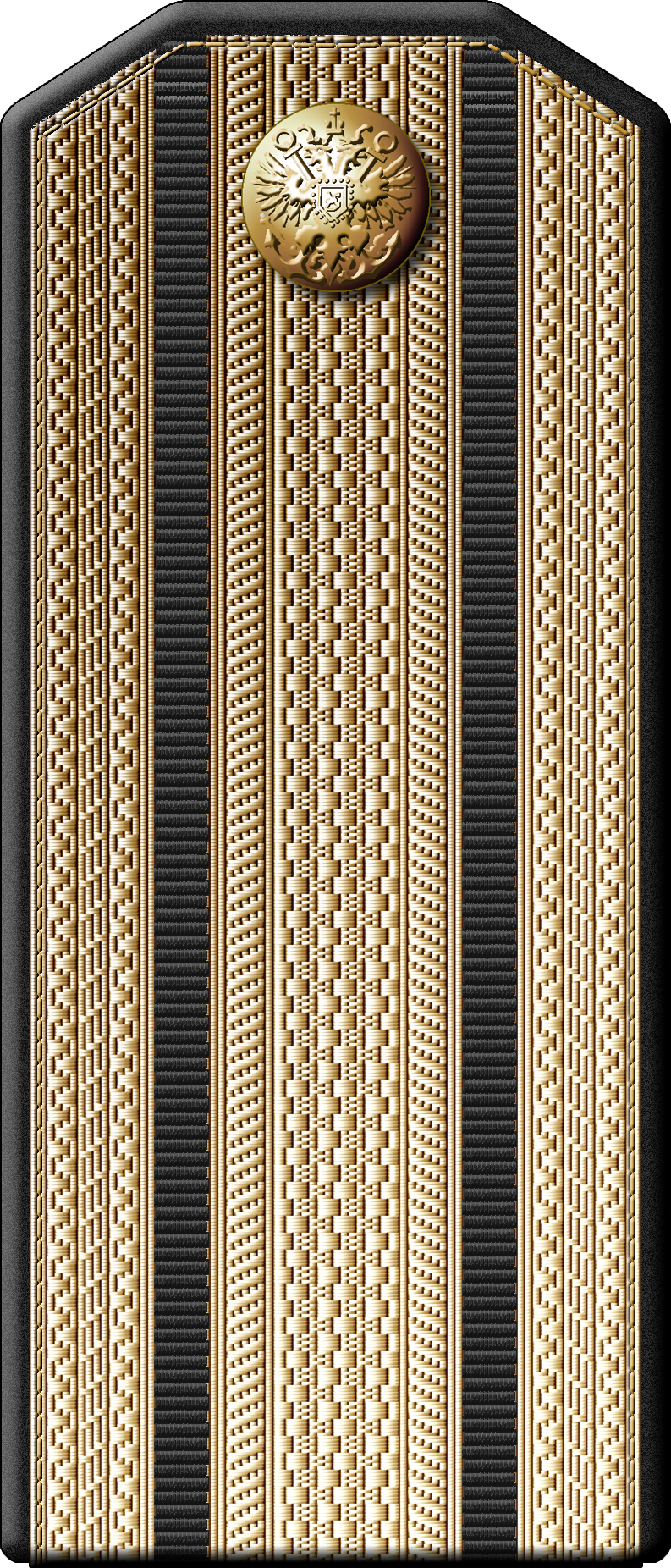
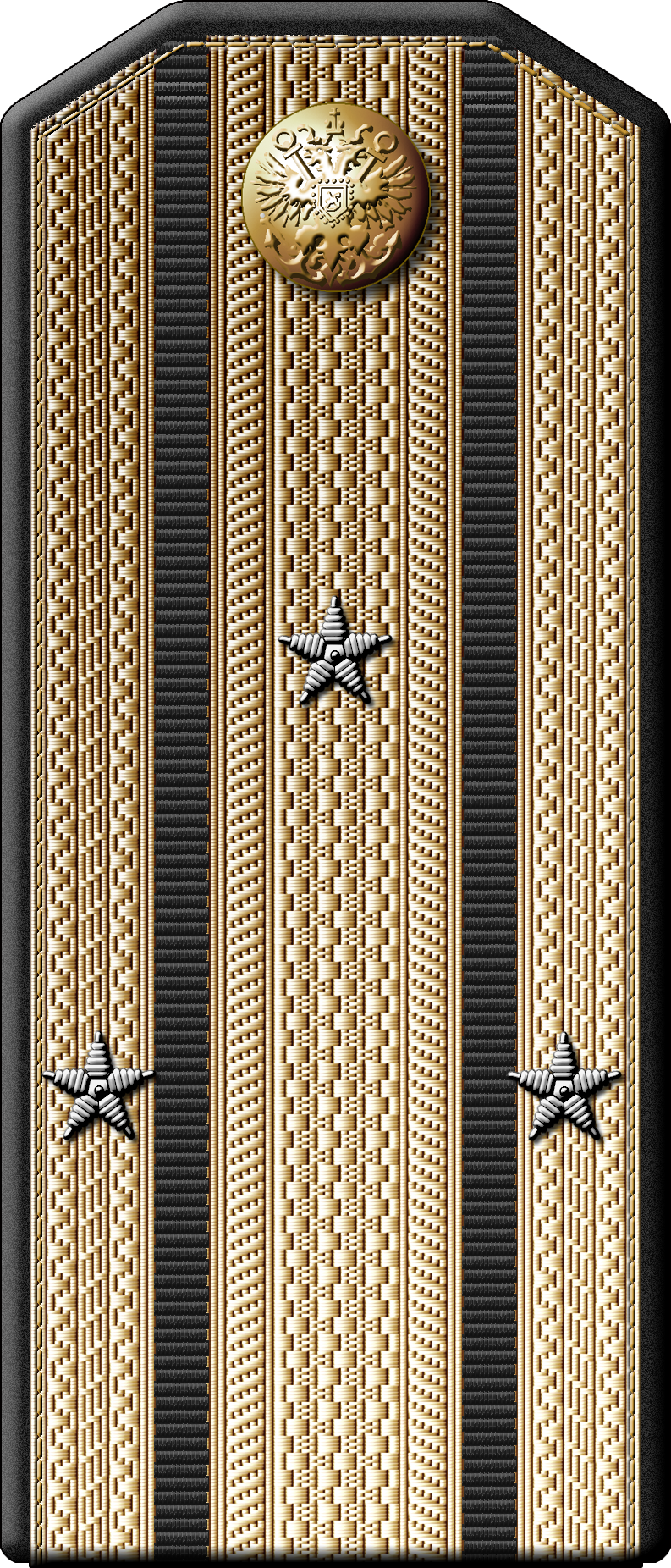
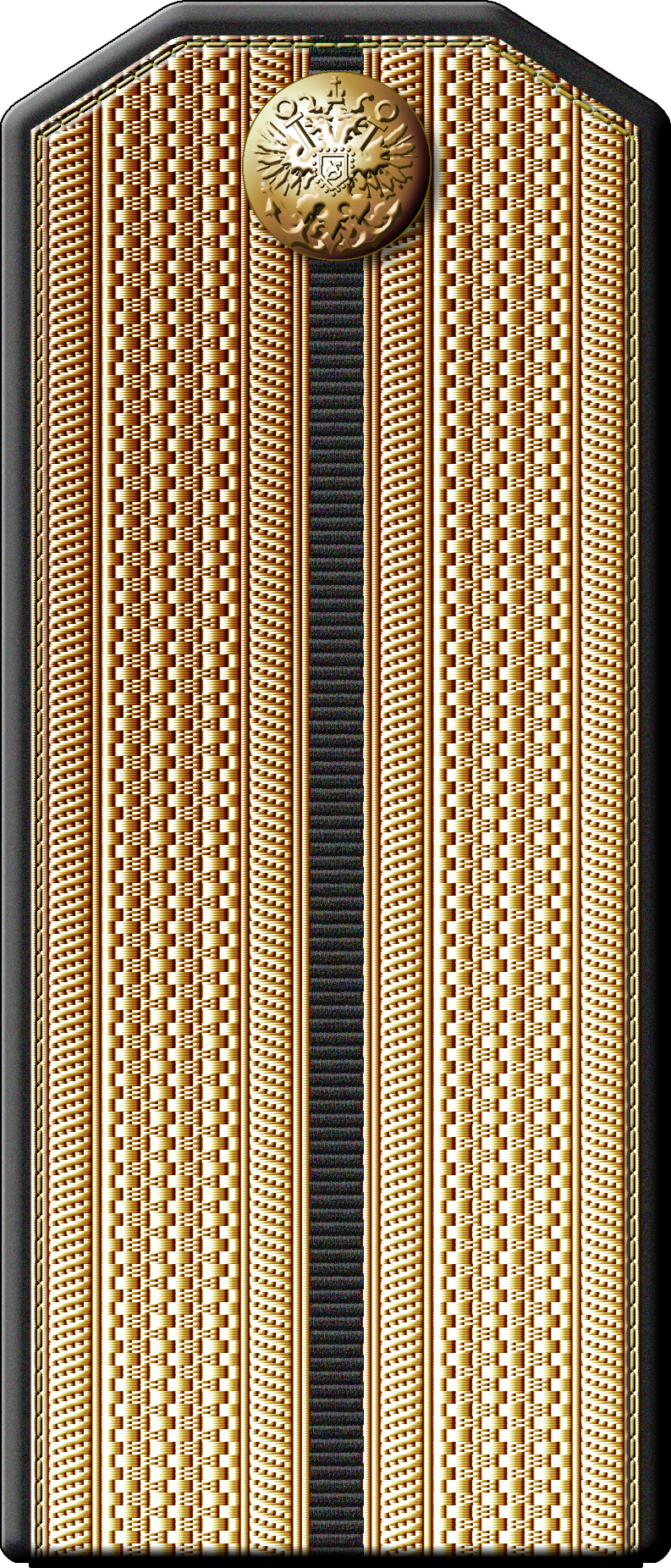
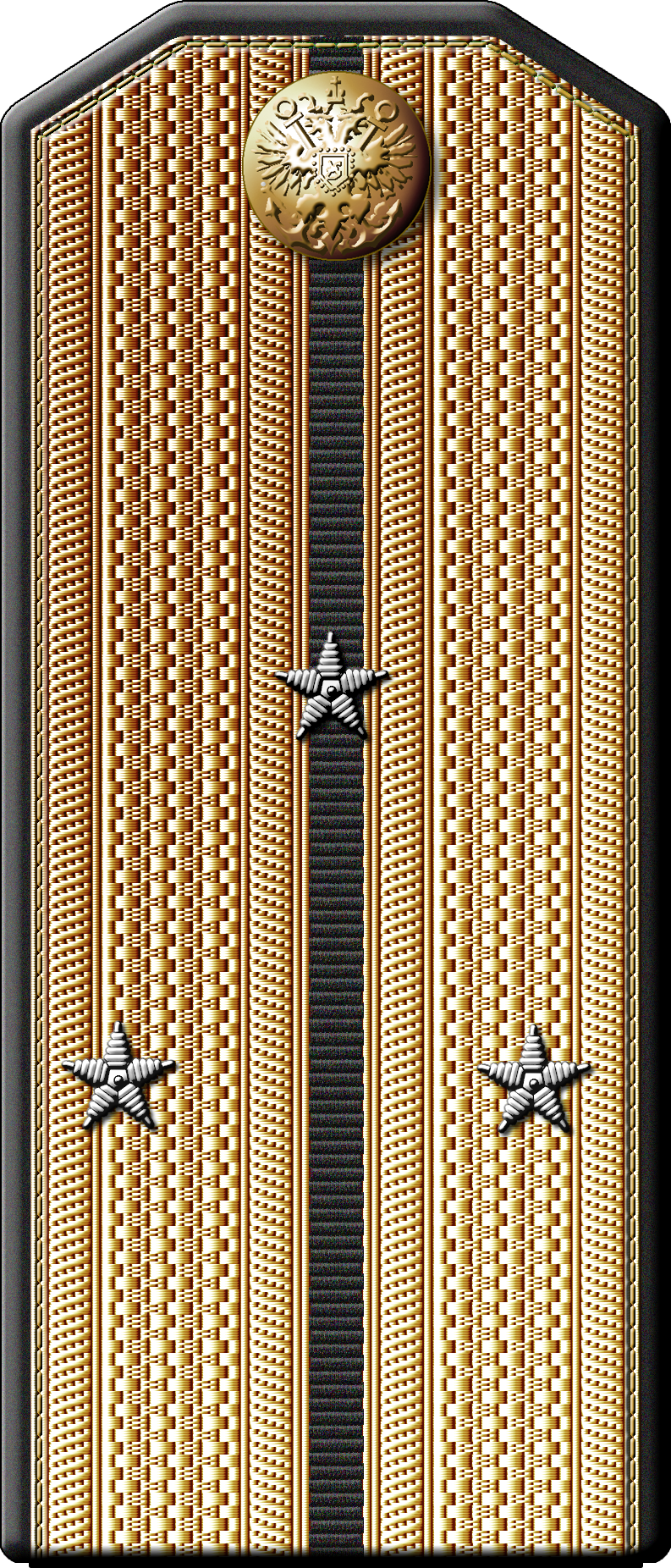
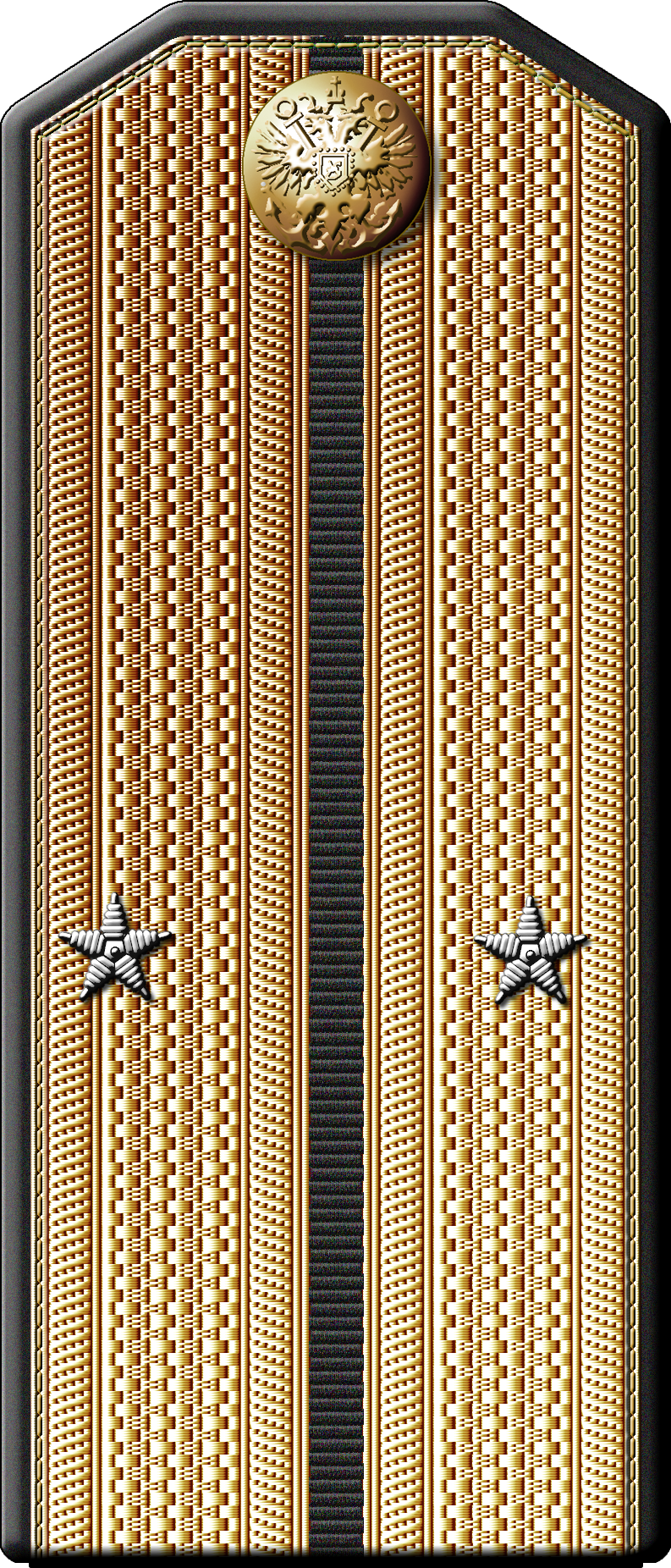
Rank group	General / flag officers							Senior officers				Junior officers
Austro-Hungarian Army (Note: Austro-Hungarian ranks are shown in both German and Hungarian, as would have been contemporary practice.)
Austro-Hungarian Army	Feldmarschall; Tábornagy		Generaloberst; Vezérezredes	General der Waffengattung; Tábornok	Feldmarschall-Leutnant; Altábornagy	Generalmajor; Vezérőrnagy		Oberst; Ezredes		Oberstleutnant; Alezredes	Major; Őrnagy	Hauptmann / Rittmeister; Százados / Kapitány		Oberleutnant; Főhadnagy		Leutnant; Hadnagy
Austro-Hungarian Navy
Austro-Hungarian Navy	Großadmiral; Főtengernagy			Admiral; Tengernagy	Vizeadmiral; Altengernagy	Kontreadmiral; Ellentengernagy		Linienschiffkapitän; Sorhajókapitány		Fregattenkapitän; Fregattkapitány	Korvettenkapitän; Korvettkapitány	Linienschiffsleutnant; Sorhajóhadnagy		Fregattenleutnant; Fregatthadnagy		Korvettenleutnant; Korvetthadnagy
Rank group	General / flag officers							Senior officers				Junior officers
Belgian Army
Belgian Army				Luitenant-generaal	Generaal-majoor			Kolonel		Luitenant-kolonel	Majoor	Kapitein-commandant	Kapitein	Luitenant	Onderluitenant	Adjutant
Rank group	General / flag officers							Senior officers				Junior officers
British Army (Note: Same insignia used by all militaries of the British Empire.)
British Army	Field marshal		General	Lieutenant-general	Major-general	Brigadier-general		Colonel		Lieutenant-colonel	Major	Captain		Lieutenant		Second lieutenant
Royal Navy
Royal Navy	Admiral of the Fleet		Admiral	Vice-admiral	Rear-admiral	Commodore 1st class		Commodore 2nd class	Captain	Commander	Lieutenant commander	Lieutenant		Sub-lieutenant
Rank group	General / flag officers							Senior officers				Junior officers
(Tsardom of Bulgaria (1908–1946)) Royal Bulgarian Army & Air Force
(Tsardom of Bulgaria (1908–1946)) Royal Bulgarian Army & Air Force			Генерал-полковник; General-pukovnik	Генерал-лейтенант; General-leytenant	Генерал-майор; General-mayor			Полковник; Polkovnik		Подполковник; Podpolkovnik	Майор; Mayor	Капитан; Kapitan		Старши лейтенант Starshi leytenant		Лейтенант; Leytenant
Rank group	General / flag officers							Senior officers				Junior officers
Beiyang Army
Beiyang Army			一等一级; Yīděng yījí	一等二级; Yīděng èrjí	一等三级; Yīděng sānjí			二等一级; Èrděng yījí		二等二级; Èīděng èrjí	二等三级; Èīděng sānjí	三等一级; Sānděng yījí		三等二级; Sānděng èrjí	三等三级; Sānděng sānjí	等外军官; Děng wài jūnguān
Republic of China Navy
Republic of China Navy			一等一级; Yīděng yījí	一等二级; Yīděng èrjí	一等三级; Yīděng sānjí			二等一级; Èrděng yījí		二等二级; Èīděng èrjí	二等三级; Èīděng sānjí	三等一级; Sānděng yījí		三等二级; Sānděng èrjí	三等三级; Sānděng sānjí
Rank group	General / flag officers							Senior officers				Junior officers
French Army
French Army	Maréchal de France (Note: Maréchal de France and Amiral de France were as much a dignity of state as a military title. Thus British Field Marshals consulted with French Generals in 1914. The elevation of Joseph Joffre to Maréchal in 1916 actually marked a diminution of his powers of command. There was no Amiral de France alive during World War I.)		Général de division ayant un commandement supérieur (général) (Note: Unofficial rank insignia.)		Général de division	Général de brigade		Colonel		Lieutenant-colonel	Commandant	Capitaine		Lieutenant		Sous-lieutenant
French Navy
French Navy	Amiral de France		Vice-amiral commandant (amiralissime)		Vice-amiral	Contre-amiral		Capitaine de vaisseau		Capitaine de frégate	Capitaine de corvette	Lieutenant de vaisseau		Enseigne de vaisseau de 1^{re} classe		Enseigne de vaisseau de 2^{e} classe
Rank group	General / flag officers							Senior officers				Junior officers
Imperial German Army
Imperial German Army	Generalfeldmarschall	Generaloberst mit dem Rang als Generalfeldmarschall	Generaloberst	General der Waffengattung	Generalleutnant	Generalmajor		Oberst		Oberstleutnant	Major	Hauptmann / Rittmeister		Oberleutnant		Leutnant
Imperial German Navy
Imperial German Navy	Großadmiral			Admiral	Vizeadmiral	Konteradmiral		Kapitän zur See/ Kommodore		Fregattenkapitän	Korvettenkapitän	Kapitänleutnant		Oberleutnant zur See		Leutnant zur See
Rank group	General / flag officers							Senior officers				Junior officers
Hellenic Army
Hellenic Army			Στρατηγός; Stratigos	Ἀντιστράτηγος; Antistratigos	Ὑποστράτηγος; Ypostratigos			Συνταγματάρχης; Syntagmatarchis		Ἀντισυνταγματάρχης; Antisyntagmatarchis	Ταγματάρχης; Tagmatarchis	Λοχαγός; Lochagos		Ὑπολοχαγός; Ypolochagós		Ἀνθυπολοχαγός; Anthypolochagos
Rank group	General / flag officers							Senior officers				Junior officers
Royal Italian Army
Royal Italian Army			Generale d'esercito	Tenente generale (Note: There were four grades of Tenente generale: capo di stato maggiore esercito, in comando d'armata, in comando di corpo d'armata and in comando di divisione.)	Maggior generale (Note: There were two grades of Maggior generale: in comando di divisione and in comando di brigata.)	Brigadier generale		Colonnello		Tenente colonnello	Maggiore	Primo capitano	Capitano	Tenente		Sottotenente
Royal Italian Navy
Royal Italian Navy			Ammiraglio	Vice ammiraglio	Contrammiraglio	Sottoammiraglio		Capitano di vascello		Capitano di fregata	Capitano di corvetta	Tenente di vascello		Sottotenente di vascello		Guardiamarina
Rank group	General / flag officers							Senior officers				Junior officers
Imperial Japanese Army
Imperial Japanese Army	大元帥陸軍大将; Daigensui-Rikugun-Taishō	元帥陸軍大将; Gensui-Rikugun-Taishō	陸軍大将; Rikugun-Taishō	陸軍中将; Rikugun-Chūjō	陸軍少将; Rikugun-Shōshō			陸軍大佐; Rikugun-Taisa		陸軍中佐; Rikugun-Chūsa	陸軍少佐; Rikugun-Shōsa	陸軍大尉; Rikugun-Tai-i		陸軍中尉; Rikugun-Chūi	陸軍少尉; Rikugun-Shōi	准尉; Jun-i
Imperial Japanese Navy
Imperial Japanese Navy	大元帥海軍大将; Daigensui-Kaigun-Taishō	元帥海軍大将; Gensui-kaigun-Taishō	海軍大将; Kaigun-Taishō	海軍中将; Kaigun-Chūjō	海軍少将; Kaigun-Shōshō			海軍大佐; Kaigun-Daisa		海軍中佐; Kaigun-Chūsa	海軍少佐; Kaigun-Shōsa	海軍大尉; Kaigun-Dai-i		海軍中尉; Kaigun-Chūi	海軍少尉; Kaigun-Shōi	兵曹長; Hēsōchō
Rank group	General / flag officers							Senior officers				Junior officers
Royal Montenegrin Army
Royal Montenegrin Army	Vrhovni komandant			Glavni komandant	Divizjar	Brigadir				Komandir		Kapetan		Poručnik		Potporučnik
Rank group	General / flag officers							Senior officers				Junior officers
Ottoman Army
Ottoman Army	مشير; Müşîr			فريق اول; Ferik-i evvel	فريق; Ferik	ميرلواء; Mirliva		ميرالاي; Miralay		قايمقام; Kaymakam	بنباشي; Binbaşı	يوزباشي; Yüzbaşı		ملازم اول; Mülâzım-ı evvel		ملازم ثاني; Mülâzım-ı sânî
Ottoman Navy
Ottoman Navy	مشير اميرال; Müşîr amiral			اميرال; Amiral	وايس اميرال; Vice amiral	لواء اميرال; Liva amiral	كومودور; Komodor	قالين قپتاني; Kalyon kaptanı		فرقطين قپتاني; Fırkateyn kaptanı	قورڤت قپتاني; Korvet kaptanı	برنجي صنف يوزباشي; Birinci sınıf yüzbaşı	يوزباشي; Yüzbaşı	ملازم اول; Mülâzım-ı evvel	ملازم ثاني; Mülâzım-ı sânî	مهندس; Mühendis (Note: Worn on the collar.)
Rank group	General / flag officers							Senior officers				Junior officers
Portuguese Army
Portuguese Army	Marechal (Note: Almirante and Marechal were only honorary ranks, not held by anyone during World War I.)			General (Note: The Portuguese Army had the particularity of having only a single rank of General Officer. A Portuguese General could be assigned to command from a division to the entire Army.)				Coronel (Note: The brigade's organization was British Army model, so the brigade commander was this rank.)		Tenente-coronel	Major	Capitão		Tenente		Alferes
Portuguese Navy
Portuguese Navy	Almirante		Vice-almirante	Contra-almirante				Capitão de mar e guerra		Capitão de fragata	Capitão-tenente	Primeiro-tenente		Segundo-tenente		Guarda-marinha
Rank group	General / flag officers							Senior officers				Junior officers
Royal Romanian Army (Note: Color for the infantry service branch and generals shown. Each service branch as well as the ten Roșiori regiments had distinct colors for the rank insignia.)
Royal Romanian Army				General de corp de armată	General de divizie	General de brigadă		Colonel		Locotenent-colonel	Maior	Căpitan		Locotenent		Sublocotenent
Rank group	General / flag officers							Senior officers				Junior officers
Imperial Russian Army (Note: Army/cavalry ranks shown. The cossack cavalry had distinct ranks.)
Imperial Russian Army	Генерал-фельдмаршал; General-fel'dmarshal		Генерал рода войск General roda voysk	Генерал-лейтенант; General-leytenant	Генерал-майор; General-mayor			Полковник; Polkovnik		Подполковник; Podpolkovnik		Капитан; Kapitan (Note: Cavalry rank: Rotmistr (Russian: Ротмистр))	Штабс-капитан; Shtabs-kapitan (Note: Cavalry rank: Shtabs-rotmistr (Russian: Штабс-ротмистр))	Поручик; Poruchik	Подпоручик; Podporuchik (Note: Cavalry rank: Kornet (Russian: Корнет))	Прапорщик; Praporshik
Imperial Russian Navy
Imperial Russian Navy	Генерал-адмирал; General-admiral		Адмирал; Admiral	Вице-адмирал; Vitse-admiral	Контр-адмирал; Kontr-admiral			Капитан I ранга Kapitan 1-go ranga		Капитан II ранга Kapitan 2-go ranga		Старший лейтенант Starshiy-leytenant		Лейтенант; Leytenant		Мичман; Michman
Provisional Russian Navy (from 1917)
Provisional Russian Navy (from 1917)			Адмирал; Admiral	Вице-адмирал; Vitse-admiral	Контр-адмирал; Kontr-admiral			Капитан I ранга Kapitan 1-go ranga		Капитан II ранга Kapitan 2-go ranga		Старший лейтенант Starshiy-leytenant		Лейтенант; Leytenant		Мичман; Michman
Rank group	General / flag officers							Senior officers				Junior officers
Royal Serbian Army
Royal Serbian Army	Bojni Vojvoda (Note: Field Marshal of Serbia (Voivode) was the highest rank in the army of the Kingdom of Serbia. Radomir Putnik held title from beginning of the war since he was promoted in 1912.)		General (Note: Like the Portuguese Army, the Serbian Army had only a single rank of General Officer. A Serbian General could be assigned to command from a division to the entire Army.)					Pukovnik		Potpukovnik	Major	Kapetan 1. klase	Kapetan 2. klase	Poručnik		Potporučnik
Rank group	General / flag officers							Senior officers				Junior officers
United States Army
United States Army	General of the Armies (Note: The US rank Admiral of the Navy was a unique rank created for Admiral George Dewey after the Spanish–American War; it has never been held by any other person. General of the Armies was granted to General Pershing at the end of the war.)		General	Lieutenant general	Major general	Brigadier general		Colonel		Lieutenant colonel	Major	Captain		First lieutenant		Second lieutenant
United States Navy
United States Navy	Admiral of the Navy		Admiral	Vice admiral	Rear admiral	Commodore		Captain		Commander	Lieutenant commander	Lieutenant		Lieutenant (junior grade)		Ensign
Rank group	General / flag officers							Senior officers				Junior officers

== See also ==
- Comparative officer ranks of World War II
- Rank insignia of the Imperial Russian Army 1917
- List of comparative military ranks
