= Gast =

Gast is a surname and given name. Notable people with the name include:

- Alice Gast (1958–2025), American academic and administrator
- Belle de Gast, Dutch racing cyclist
- Camille du Gast, sportswoman and social pioneer
- Carmen Gast, Hong Kong acrobatic gymnast
- Carolyn Bartlett Gast, American scientific illustrator
- Eric Gast, American record producer
- Gabriele Gast, German intelligence officer
- Harry Gast, American politician
- John Gast (activist), English trade unionist
- John Gast (baseball), American baseball player
- John Gast (painter), Prussian-born painter
- John Gast (priest), Irish Anglican priest and historian
- Leon Gast (1936–2021), American documentary filmmaker
- Lise Gast (1908–1988), German author
- Luce de Gast, 13th century nobleman
- Margaret Gast, German-born American racing cyclist
- Mary Susan Gast, American poet
- Michel Gast (1930–2022), French film director and produce
- Paul Werner Gast, American geologist
- Peter Gast (disambiguation)
- Roswitha Emonts-Gast, Belgian hurdler
- Silke Gast, German javelin thrower

Gast is also a given name, a form of Gaston:

- Gast Gibéryen, Luxembourgish politician
- Gast Groeber, Luxembourgish writer
- Gast Waltzing, Luxembourgish trumpeter and composer

== See also ==
- Gast gun, twin barreled machine gun
- Gast (film), a 2021 Indian film
- Le Gast, France
- Matthias Gast House in Maria Stein, Ohio, US
- Gast Mansion in Pueblo, Colorado, US
