= John Gast =

John Gast may refer to:

- John Gast (activist) (1772–1837), English shipwright and labour activist
- John Gast (baseball) (born 1989), American baseball pitcher
- John Gast (priest) (1715–1788) Archdeacon of Glendalough from 1764 to 1788
- John Gast (painter) (1842–1896), Prussian-American painter and lithographer
