= Ranks in the Austro-Hungarian Navy =

The rank insignia of the Austro-Hungarian Navy were worn on and on sleeves for navy jackets and coats, or on shoulder straps of shirts and white jackets. Officers' ranks were indicated by lines of 1.3 centimetres (0.51 in) gold braid as were senior non-commissioned officers' ranks, enlisted men's rank was indicated by white stars on their square collar flaps. Senior officers and flag officers would wear a broader gold braid line (Stabsoffiziers-Distinktionsborte or General-Distinktionsborte resp.) of 3.3 centimetres (1.3 in) and 5.3 centimetres (2.1 in) resp. beneath smaller lines, in addition flag officers would wear a crown on top of their sleeve insignia.

== Rank system ==
For enlisted men an elaborate rank system existed distinguishing between Mannschaften (crew), Chargen (junior non-commissioned officers), Unteroffizieren (Maaten/NCOs) and Bootsleute/Feldwebel (senior NCOs). In addition the rank indicated the special training the men had received, indicated by a specialty badge worn on the left sleeve. The basic rank would be combined with the specialty resulting in numerous ratings. Non-commissioned officers would be seamen 1st class (one white star) or Gasten and Quartiermeister depending on specialty (two white stars) and Maate (three white stars). Bootsleute would wear the blue or white navy jacket with gold braid half stripes of 11 cm length on the sleeves or shoulder straps. They would be called Meister (master) sometimes Untermeister in the basic rank, the next senior rank would be 'preceded by Stabs- (staff), and then Oberstabs-.

== Enlisted men and Chargen ==
Career and specialist insignia indicated on left sleeve.

Mannschaften	Chargen 1 star	Chargen 2 stars
k.u.k. Geschützvormeister 2. Klasse	k.u.k. Geschützvormeister 1. Klasse	k.u.k. Geschützgast
k.u.k. ...matrose 2. Klasse	k.u.k. ...matrose 1. Klasse	k.u.k. ...gast / ...quartiermeister
Elektromatrose ...; Fliegermatrose ...; Küchenmatrose ...; Musikmatrose ...; Proviantmatrose ...; Sanitätsmatrose ...; Steuermatrose ...; Telegraphenmatrose ...; Waffenmatrose ...	Elektromatrose ...; Fliegermatrose ...; Küchenmatrose ...; Musikmatrose ...; Proviantmatrose ...; Sanitätsmatrose ...; Steuermatrose ...; Telegraphenmatrose ...; Waffenmatrose ...	Elektrogast / Elektroquartiermeister; Fliegergast / Fliegerquartiermeister; Küchengast / Küchenquartiermeister; Marsgast / ...; Minengast / Minenquartiermeister; Musikgast / Musikquartiermeister; Proviantgast / Proviantquartiermeister; Rudergast / Ruderquartiermeister; Sanitätsgast / Sanitätsquartiermeister; Steuergast / Steuerquartiermeister; Telegraphengast / Telegraphen; Torpedogast / Torpedoquartiermeister; Waffengast / Waffenquartiermeister
k.u.k. Heizer 2. Klasse	k.u.k. Heizer 1. Klasse	k.u.k. Oberheizer
k.u.k. Militärarbeiter 2. Klasse k.u.k. Minenvormann 2. Klasse k.u.k. Torpedovormann 2. Klasse	k.u.k. Militärarbeiter 1. Klasse k.u.k. Minenvormann 1. Klasse k.u.k. Torpedovormann 1. Klasse	k.u.k. Vorarbeiter ...: Vorarbeiter 3. Klasse; Vorarbeiter 2.Klassee

== Maate on junior NCO level ==
Maate	Maate (on Bootsmann grade)
k.u.k. Bootsmannsmaat	k.u.k. Unterbootsmann
k.u.k. Geschützmaat	k.u.k. Untergeschützmeister
k.u.k. ...maat	k.u.k. ...
Elektromaat; Fliegermaat; Küchenmaat; Maschinenmaat; Minenmaat; Musikmaat; Proviantmaat; Sanitätsmaat; Steuermannsmaat; Telegraphenmaat; Torpedomaat; Waffenmaat	Elektrounterwärter; Fliegeruntermeister; Unterküchenmeister; Untermaschinenwärter; Unterminenmeister; Untermusikmeister; Unterproviantmeister; Untersanitätsmeister; Untersteuermann; Untertelegraphenmeister; Untertorpedomeister; Unterwaffenmeister
k.u.k. Vorarbeiter 1.Klasse	k.u.k. Unterwerkmeister

== Rank insignia senior NCOs ==
Stabsunteroffiziere
k.u.k. Stabsbootsmann: Elektromeister; Fliegermeister; Küchenmeister; Musikmeister; Proviantmeister; Sanitätsmeister; Stabselektrowärter; Stabsgeschützmeister; Stabsmaschinenwärter; Stabswaffenmeister; Stabssteuermann; Stabsminenmeister; Stabstorpedomeister; Werkmeister	k.u.k. Oberstabsbootsmann: Oberstabsgeschützmeister; Oberküchenmeister; Oberstabsmaschinenwärter; Oberstabswaffenmeister; Oberproviantmeister; Oberstabssteuermann; Oberstabsminenmeister; Oberstabsfliegermeister; Oberstabselektrowärter; Oberstabstorpedomeister; Obermusikmeister; Oberstabstelegraphenmeister; Obersanitätsmeister; Oberstabswerkmeister	Einjährig-Freiwilliger	Longer serving NCOs

== Commissioned Officers ==
=== Officers aspirants ===
Prospective officers would enter the naval academy and become Seekadett (officer cadets) and later Seefähnrich before being commissioned as Fregattenleutnants. Reserve officer candidates would join as Einjährig-Freiwillige (one-year volunteers). These sons of the higher classes who could afford the expenses would then get some training and be commissioned as Korvettenleutnant if successful. Einjährige would also wear the blue navy jacket but with two smaller gold braid stripes.

=== Officers ===
		Stabsoffiziere			Oberoffiziere		Reserveoffizier	Fähnriche	
Sleeve									
Title	German	Linienschiffskapitän	Fregattenkapitän	Korvettenkapitän	Linienschiffsleutnant	Fregattenleutnant	Korvettenleutnant	Seefähnrich	Seekadett
Title	Hungarian	Sorhajókapitány	Fregattkapitány	Korvettkapitány	Sorhajóhadnagy	Fregatthadnagy	Korvetthadnagy	Tengerészzászlós	Tengerészhadapród
English		Ship-of-the-line-captain	Frigate captain	Corvette captain	Ship-of-the-line lieutenant	Frigate lieutenant	Corvette lieutenant	Ensign	Sea cadet

=== Flag officers ===
		Flaggenoffiziere			
Sleeve					
Command flag					
Command flag	1915; Never used				
Title	German	Großadmiral	Admiral	Vizeadmiral	Konteradmiral
Title	Hungarian	Főtengernagy	Tengernagy	Altengernagy	Ellentengernagy
English		Grand admiral	Admiral	Vice admiral	Rear Admiral
