= Peter Gast =

Peter Gast may refer to:

- Peter Gast (chef), Dutch Michelin starred chef of 't Schulten Hues
- Heinrich Köselitz (1854–1918), author, friend of Friedrich Nietzsche, who gave him the pseudonym "Peter Gast"
