= Linienschiffsleutnant =

Linienschiffsleutnant is a German language variant of the naval officer rank ship-of-the-line lieutenant. The rank is used by the Belgian Navy and formerly the Austro-Hungarian Navy.

== Austro-Hungary ==
Linienschiffsleutnant Sorhajóhadnagy
- Sleeve insignia
- Country: Austria-Hungary
- Service branch: Austro-Hungarian Navy
- Formation: 19th century
- Abolished: 1918
- Next higher rank: Korvettenkapitän
- Next lower rank: Fregattenleutnant
- Equivalent ranks: Hauptmann

Linienschiffsleutnant (transl. Ship-of-the-line lieutenant; Hungarian: Sorhajóhadnagy) was an officer rank in the Austro-Hungarian Navy. It was equivalent to Hauptmann of the Austro-Hungarian Army, as well to Kapitänleutnant of the Imperial German Navy. More senior ranks in the Austro-Hungarian Navy had titles in line with their German equivalents.

The rank designation was used continuously in the Austria-Hungarian follow on countries Yugoslavia, Croatia, and Slovenia, as well as in the modern day's Austrian merchant navy.

The rank name was selected in line to the division of war ships to specific ship categories early of the 19th century, e.g. corvette (Korvette), frigate (Fregatte), and to ship of the line (Linienschiff). In the Austro-Hungarian Navy the appropriate rank designations were derived as follows.

According to that systematic the rank designations to subaltern – or junior officers were derived as follows:

- Linienschiffsleutnant equivalent to Hauptmann
- Fregattenleutnant equivalent to Oberleutnant
- Korvettenleutnant equivalent to Leutnant

== Belgium ==
Linienschiffsleutnant (French: Lieutenant de vaisseau; Flemish: Luitenant-ter-zee) is a rank used by the Belgian Naval Component. It ranks directly above an ensign and immediately below a Linienschiffsleutnant 1. klasse. It is equivalent to a captain in the Belgian Land Component, Air Component and Medical Component.

== See also ==
- Ranks in the Austro-Hungarian Navy
- Belgian military ranks
