= Korvettenleutnant =

Korvettenleutnant Tengerészzászlós
- Sleeve insignia
- Country: Austria-Hungary
- Service branch: Austro-Hungarian Navy
- Next higher rank: Fregattenleutnant
- Next lower rank: Seekadett
- Equivalent ranks: Seefähnrich; Leutnant

Korvettenleutnant (Hungarian: Tengerészzászlós; transl. Corvette lieutenant) was an officer rank in the Austro-Hungarian Navy. It was equivalent to Leutnant of the Austro-Hungarian Army, as well to Leutnant zur See of the Imperial German Navy. Pertaining to the modern day's NATO rank code it could be comparable to OF-1b.

The rank of Korvettenleutnant was limited to naval reserve officers. Professional officers skipped that rank and were promoted from Seefähnrich to Fregattenleutnant (OF-1a), the next higher rank (comparable to Oberleutnant zur See). A Korvettenleutnant wore the same rank insignia as a Seefähnrich.

The rank name was selected in line to the division of war ships to specific ship categories early of the 19th century, e.g. corvette (German: Korvette), frigate (German: Fregatte), and to ship of the line (German: Linienschiff). In the Austro-Hungarian Navy the appropriate rank designations were derived as follows.

- Korvettenkapitän OF-3 (equivalent: to Heer Major)
- Fregattenkapitän OF-4 (equivalent: to Heer Oberstleutnant)
- Linienschiffskapitän OF5; (equivalent: to deutsche Marine Kapitän zur See / Heer Oberst)

According to that systematic the rank designations to subaltern – or junior officers were derived as follows:

- Korvettenleutnant OF-1b (equivalent to deutsche Marine Leutnant zur See Heer: Leutnant)
- Fregattenleutnant OF-1a (equivalent to deutsche Marine Oberleutnant zur See / Heer: Oberleutnant)
- Linienschiffsleutnant OF-2 (equivalent to deutsche Marine Kapitänleutnant / Heer:Hauptmann)

This sequence of ranks can be found in the modern Croatian naval forces.

| junior rank Seekadett | (k.u.k. Kriegsmarine rank); Seefähnrich | senior rank Fregattenleutnant |
| junior rank Seekadett | Korvettenleutnant | senior rank Fregattenleutnant |

== Other countries ==
The rank designation Korvettenleutnent was used continuously in naval forces of former Yugoslavia and as junior officer (OF-1b) rank in modern today's naval forces of Croatia, Slovenia, and Serbia.

Rank insignia Korvettenleutnant
| Country | Croatia | Serbia | Slovenia |
|---|---|---|---|
| Country | Croatian Navy | River Flotilla | Slovenian Navy |
| Shoulder sleev |
| Native designation | Poručnik korvete | Поручник корвете | Poročnik korvete |
| rank | OF-1b | OF-1a | OF-1b |

== See also ==
- Ranks in the Austro-Hungarian Navy
- Croatian military ranks
- Military ranks of Serbia
- Slovenian military ranks
