= Fregattenleutnant =

Fregattenleutnant Fregatthadnagy
- Sleeve insignia
- Country: Austria-Hungary
- Service branch: Austro-Hungarian Navy
- Formation: c. 1908
- Next higher rank: Linienschiffsleutnant
- Next lower rank: Korvettenleutnant
- Equivalent ranks: Oberleutnant

Fregattenleutnant (Hungarian: Fregatthadnagy; transl. Fregate lieutenant) was an officer rank in the Austro-Hungarian Navy. It was equivalent to Oberleutnant of the Austro-Hungarian Army, as well to Oberleutnant zur See of the Imperial German Navy. Pertaining to the modern day's NATO rank code it could be comparable to OF-1a (senior).

The rank of Fregattenleutnant was superior to Korvettenleutnant and inferior to Linienschiffsleutnant. Until 1908 the rank was called Linienschiffsfähnrich (ship-of-the-line ensign).

Professional officers skipped the rank Korvettenleutnant (OF-1b) and were directly promoted from Seefähnrich to Fregattenleutnant (comparable to Oberleutnant zur See).

The rank name was selected in line to the division of war ships to specific ship categories early of the 19th century, e.g. corvette (German: Korvette), frigate (German: Fregatte), and to ship of the line (German: Linienschiff). In the Austro-Hungarian Navy the appropriate rank designations were derived as follows.

- Korvettenkapitän OF-3 (equivalent: to Heer Major)
- Fregattenkapitän OF-4 (equivalent: to Heer Oberstleutnant)
- Linienschiffskapitän OF5; (equivalent: to deutsche Marine Kapitän zur See / Heer Oberst)

According to that systematic the rank designations to subaltern – or junior officers were derived as follows:

- Korvettenleutnant OF-1b (equivalent to deutsche Marine Leutnant zur See Heer: Leutnant)
- Fregattenleutnant OF-1a (equivalent to deutsche Marine Oberleutnant zur See / Heer: Oberleutnant)
- Linienschiffsleutnant OF-2 (equivalent to deutsche Marine Kapitänleutnant / Heer:Hauptmann)

This sequence of ranks can be found in the today's Croatian naval forces.

Preceded by junior rank Seefähnrich; Korvettenleutnant	(k.u.k. Kriegsmarine rank); Fregattenleutnant	Succeeded by senior rank Linienschiffsleutnant

== Other countries ==
The rank designation Fregattenleutnent was used continuously in naval forces of former Yugoslavia and as junior officer (OF-1a) rank in modern today's naval forces of Croatia, Slovenia and Serbia.

Rank insignia Fregattenleutnant
Country	Croatia	Serbia	Slovenia
Country	Croatian Navy	River Flotilla	Slovenian Navy
Shoulder sleeve
Native designation	Poručnik fregate	Поручник фрегатe	Poročnik fregate
rank	OF-1a	OF-2	OF-1a

== See also ==
- Ranks in the Austro-Hungarian Navy
- Croatian military ranks
- Military ranks of Serbia
- Slovenian military ranks
