= Matthias Gast House =

Historic house in Ohio, United States

- Matthias Gast House and General Store
- U.S. National Register of Historic Places
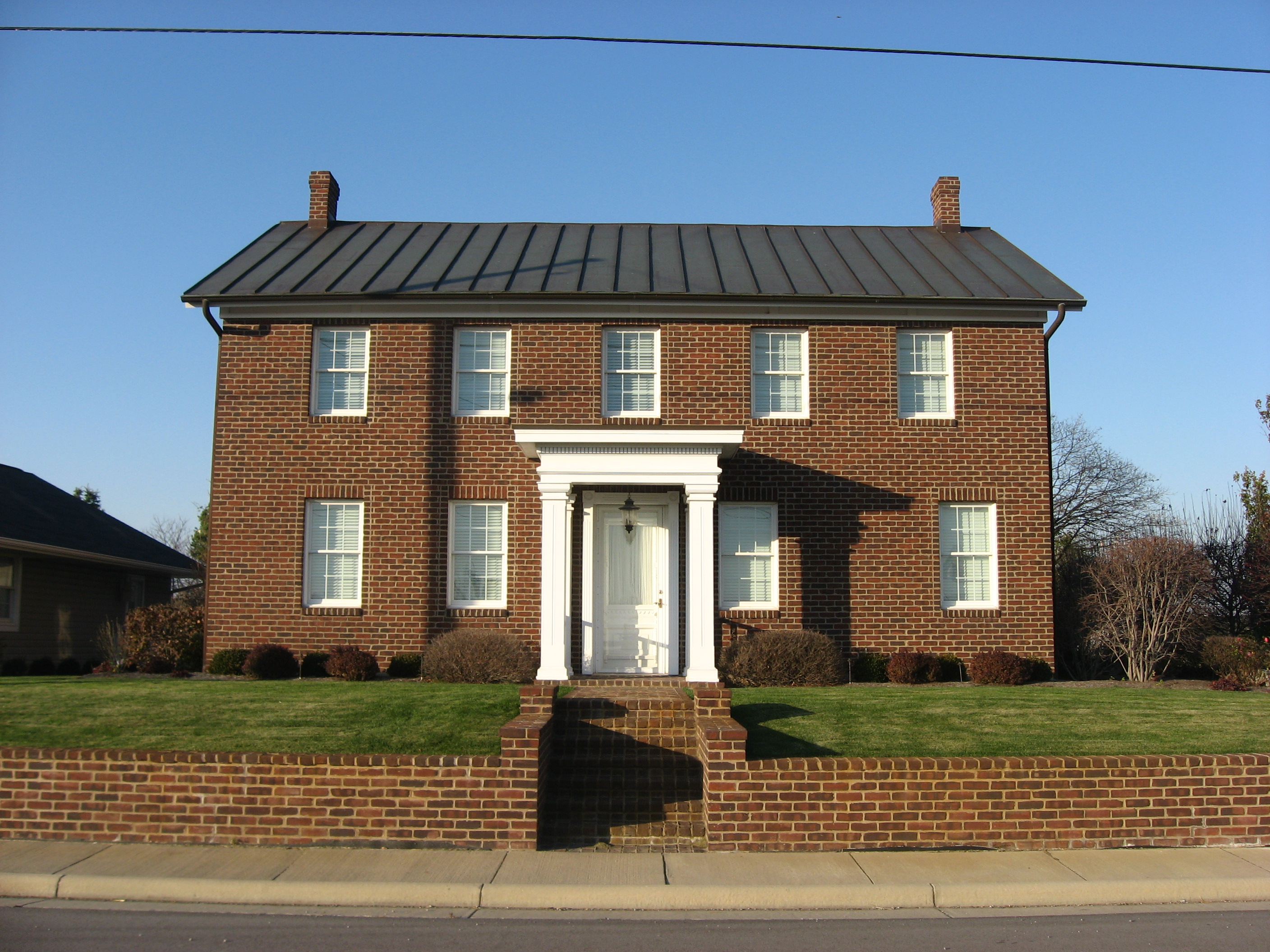
- Front of the house

- Location within Ohio Location within the United States
- Location: State Route 119, Maria Stein, Ohio
- Coordinates: 40°24′28″N 84°28′13″W
- Area: less than one acre
- Built: 1852
- Architect: Matthias Gast
- NRHP reference No.: 78002139
- Added to NRHP: December 29, 1978

The Matthias Gast House is a historic building in Maria Stein, Ohio, United States. Built in the middle of the nineteenth century, it was the home of one of Mercer County's most prominent early citizens, and it has been designated a historic site because of its importance in local history.

== Gast ==
A native of France, Matthias Gast was born in 1813 and immigrated to the United States in 1828. One of Marion Township's earliest settlers, he opened the community's first shoe store in 1833 and soon began to expand his business into other nearby communities. As the years passed, Gast became prominent throughout Marion County, serving as one of its earliest county commissioners.

== Architecture ==
The Gast House is a rectangular structure, five bays wide on the front and two bays wide on the sides. Both the foundation and the two-story walls are built of brick. Gast erected two structures around his house: a frame store to the west and a frame summer kitchen; before the store was built, he operated a store and hotel out of his house. In later years, younger members of the Gast family built a substantial addition to the rear of the house to accommodate increasing numbers of relatives. Among the later owners of the property was Martha Gast, who used the store as a room for storing hardware.

== Recognition ==
In 1978, the Gast property — parts of which had been sold to other families — was listed on the National Register of Historic Places. It qualified for inclusion on the Register for three different reasons: as the home of a leading member of local society, as a leading element of local history, and as a well-preserved example of historic architecture. The complex is one of three groups of buildings in Maria Stein that are listed on the Register, along with the Maria Stein Convent and St. John the Baptist Catholic Church.
