= Gast Groeber =

Luxembourgish writer

Gast Groeber (born 1960) is a writer from Luxembourg. He grew up in Hollerich and studied at the Institut Supérieur d'Études et de Recherches Pédagogiques in Walferdange. He has been pursuing various careers in education since then. He is also a prize-winning author. His book of short stories All Dag Verstoppt En Aneren won the European Union Prize for Literature.

== Bibliography ==
=== Books ===
- All Dag verstoppt en aneren (2014) – Short story collection. Winner of the Lëtzebuerger Buchpräis and the European Union Prize for Literature.ISBN 9782879674339
- Aktuelle Wetterwarnung: überwiegend dichter Nebel (2018) – Awarded the MEP's Prize in the EUPL Writing Contest.ISBN 9782879677293
- Zweemol schwaarze Kueder (2019) – Honored with the Coup de cœur du Jury of the Lëtzebuerger Buchpräis.

=== Recognition ===
- European Union Prize for Literature (2016)
- Multiple national awards, including the Lëtzebuerger Buchpräis and jury prizes
- All six published works shortlisted for Luxembourg's most prestigious literary prize

=== Summary ===
Title	Year	Award/Recognition
All Dag verstoppt en aneren	2014	EU Prize for Literature, Lëtzebuerger Buchpräis
Aktuelle Wetterwarnung: überwiegend dichter Nebel	2018	MEP's Prize (EUPL Writing Contest)
Zweemol schwaarze Kueder	2019	Coup de cœur du Jury (Lëtzebuerger Buchpräis)
Other works (3 titles)	2010–present	All shortlisted for Lëtzebuerger Buchpräis
