= 't Schulten Hues =

Coordinates: 52°8′21.15″N 6°11′41.79″E

- Interactive map of 't Schulten Hues

Restaurant information
- Closed: July 2018
- Head chef: Peter Gast
- Food type: French, Regional
- Rating: Michelin Guide
- Location: 's-Gravenhof 5-7, Zutphen, 7201 DN, Netherlands
- Seating capacity: 50
- Website: Official website

't Schulten Hues was a restaurant in Zutphen, Netherlands. It was a fine dining restaurant that was awarded one Michelin star for the period 2005–2018.

GaultMillau awarded the restaurant 16 out of 20 points.

Head chef of 't Schulten Hues is Peter Gast.

Gast and his wife Jacqueline van Liere opened the restaurant in September 2002. Originally, the restaurant was located on the Houtmarkt, but moved to a bigger location at 's-Gravenhof in 2007.

== Book ==
In 2010, 't Schulten Hues presented a book named "Portfolio XL" in a rather exceptional size: 0.5 meter x 0.7 meter.

The restaurant closed on July 1, 2018, because the owners wanted to take on a new challenge in Amsterdam.

== See also ==
- List of Michelin starred restaurants in the Netherlands
