= John Gast (priest) =

Irish Anglican priest (1715–1788)

John Gast (1715 - 1788) was an Irish Anglican priest and historian.

The son of a French Huguenot, Gast was educated at Trinity College, Dublin. He was the Archdeacon of Glendalough from 1764 to 1778. He also wrote extensively on Irish and Greek history.
