= Slovenian military ranks =

The Slovenian military ranks are the military insignia used by the Slovenian Armed Forces.

== Commissioned officer ranks ==
The rank insignia of commissioned officers.

| NATO code | OF-10 | OF-9 | OF-8 | OF-7 | OF-6 | OF-5 | OF-4 | OF-3 | OF-2 | OF-1 |
|---|---|---|---|---|---|---|---|---|---|---|---|
| Slovenian Ground Force |
| Slovenian Ground Force | | General | Generalpodpolkovnik | Generalmajor | Brigadir | Polkovnik | Podpolkovnik | Major | Stotnik | Nadporočnik | Poročnik |
| Slovenia Navy |
| Slovenia Navy | | Admiral | Vice admiral | Kontraadmiral | Kapitan | Kapitan bojne ladje | Kapitan fregate | Kapitan korvete | Poročnik bojne ladje | Poročnik fregate | Poročnik korvete |
| (Slovenia) Slovenian Air Force and Air Defence |
| (Slovenia) Slovenian Air Force and Air Defence | | General polkovnik | Generalpodpolkovnik | Generalmajor | Brigadni general | Polkovnik | Podpolkovnik | Major | Stotnik | Nadporočnik | Poročnik |
| NATO code | OF-10 | OF-9 | OF-8 | OF-7 | OF-6 | OF-5 | OF-4 | OF-3 | OF-2 | OF-1 |

== Other ranks ==
The rank insignia of non-commissioned officers and enlisted personnel.

| NATO code | OR-9 | | | OR-8 | | OR-7 | OR-6 | OR-5 | OR-4 | OR-3 | OR-2 | OR-1 |
|---|---|---|---|---|---|---|---|---|---|---|---|---|
| Slovenian Ground Force |
| Slovenian Ground Force | Višji štabni praporščak | Štabni praporščak | Višji praporščak | Praporščak | Višji štabni vodnik | Štabni vodnik | Višji vodnik | Vodnik | Naddesetnik | Desetnik | Poddesetnik | Vojak |
| Slovenia Navy |
| Slovenia Navy | Višji štabni praporščak | Štabni praporščak | Višji praporščak | Praporščak | Višji štabni vodnik | Štabni vodnik | Višji vodnik | Vodnik | Naddesetnik | Desetnik | Poddesetnik | Vojak |
| (Slovenia) Slovenian Air Force and Air Defence |
| (Slovenia) Slovenian Air Force and Air Defence | Višji štabni praporščak | Štabni praporščak | Višji praporščak | Praporščak | Višji štabni vodnik | Štabni vodnik | Višji vodnik | Vodnik | Naddesetnik | Desetnik | Poddesetnik | Vojak |
| NATO code | OR-9 | | | OR-8 | | OR-7 | OR-6 | OR-5 | OR-4 | OR-3 | OR-2 | OR-1 |
