= Oberbootsmann =

- shoulder board / cuff title / mounting loop
- Country: Germany
- Service branch: German Navy
- Abbreviation: OBtsm or OB
- Rank group: Non-commissioned officers
- Rank: German NCO rank
- NATO rank code: OR-6
- Formation: 1955
- Next higher rank: Hauptbootsmann; Oberfähnrich zur See
- Next lower rank: Bootsmann
- Equivalent ranks: Oberfeldwebel

Oberbootsmann (OBtsm or in lists OB) designates in the German Navy of the Bundeswehr a military person or member of the armed forces. It belongs to the particular rank group Senior NCOs with port epée.

According to the salary class it is equivalent to the Oberfeldwebel of Heer or Luftwaffe. It is grouped as OR6 in NATO, equivalent to Technical Sergeant, Staff Sergeant, or Petty Officer First Class in the US Armed forces, and to Warrant Officer Class 2 in the British Army and Royal Navy.

In navy context NCOs of this rank were formally addressed as Herr Oberbootsmann also informally / short Oberbootsmann.

The sequence of ranks (top-down approach) in that particular group is as follows:
Unteroffiziere mit Portepee

- OR-9: Oberstabsbootsmann / Oberstabsfeldwebel
- OR-8: Stabsbootsmann / Stabsfeldwebel
- OR-7: Hauptbootsmann and Oberfähnrich zur See/ and Hauptfeldwebel and Oberfähnrich
- OR-6a: Oberbootsmann/ Oberfeldwebel
- OR-6b: Bootsmann and Fähnrich zur See/ Feldwebel and Fähnrich

== Equivalent in other NATO countries ==
- – Premier-maître chef/ Eerste meester
- – Chief petty officer 2nd class/ Premier maître de 2e classe
- – Stožerni narednik
- – Seniorsergent
- – Premier maître
- – Επικελευστής/ Epikelefstis
- – Petty officer/specialist (after 6 years service)
- – secondo capo scelto
- – Sergeant-majoor
- – no equivalent
- – Młodszy chorąży marynarki
- – Sargento-ajudante
- – Sargento primero
- – Chief Petty Officer/ Colour Sergeant
- – Chief Petty Officer/ Gunnery Sergeant

junior Rank; Bootsmann	Oberbootsmann	senior Rank; Hauptbootsmann Oberfähnrich zur See

== See also ==
- Ranks of the German Bundeswehr
- Rank insignia of the German Bundeswehr
