= Hauptbootsmann =

- shoulder board / cuff title / mounting loop
- Country: Germany
- Service branch: German Navy
- Abbreviation: HptBtsm
- Rank group: German NCO rank
- NATO rank code: OR-7
- Pay grade: A8Z
- Formation: 1955
- Next higher rank: Stabsbootsmann
- Next lower rank: Oberbootsmann
- Equivalent ranks: Hauptfeldwebel

Hauptbootsmann (HptBtsm or in lists HB) designates in the German Navy of the Bundeswehr a military person or member of the armed forces. It belongs to the particular rank group Senior NCOs with port épée.

According to the salary class it is equivalent to the Officer Aspirant (OA – de: Offizieranwärter) rank Oberfähnrich zur See (Marine) and to and Hauptfeldwebel of Heer or Luftwaffe. It is grouped as OR7 and OR-8 in NATO, equivalent to First Sergeant, Master Sergeant, or Chief Petty Officer in the US Armed forces, and to Warrant Officer Class 2 in the British Army and Royal Navy.

In navy context NCOs of this rank were formally addressed as Herr/ Frau Hauptbootsmann also informally / short Hauptbootsmann.

The sequence of ranks (top-down approach) in that particular group is as follows:
Unteroffiziere mit Portepee

- OR-9: Oberstabsbootsmann / Oberstabsfeldwebel
- OR-8: Stabsbootsmann / Stabsfeldwebel / Hauptbootsmann / Hauptfeldwebel
- OR-7: Hauptbootsmann and Oberfähnrich zur See / and Hauptfeldwebel and Oberfähnrich
- OR-6: Oberbootsmann / Oberfeldwebel
- OR-6: Bootsmann and Fähnrich zur See/ Feldwebel and Fähnrich

junior Rank; Oberbootsmann	Hauptbootsmann	senior Rank; Stabsbootsmann
junior Rank; Oberbootsmann	Oberfähnrich zur See	senior Rank; Stabsbootsmann

== See also ==
- Rank insignia of the Bundeswehr
