= Feuerwerker =

Ordnance technician in the military

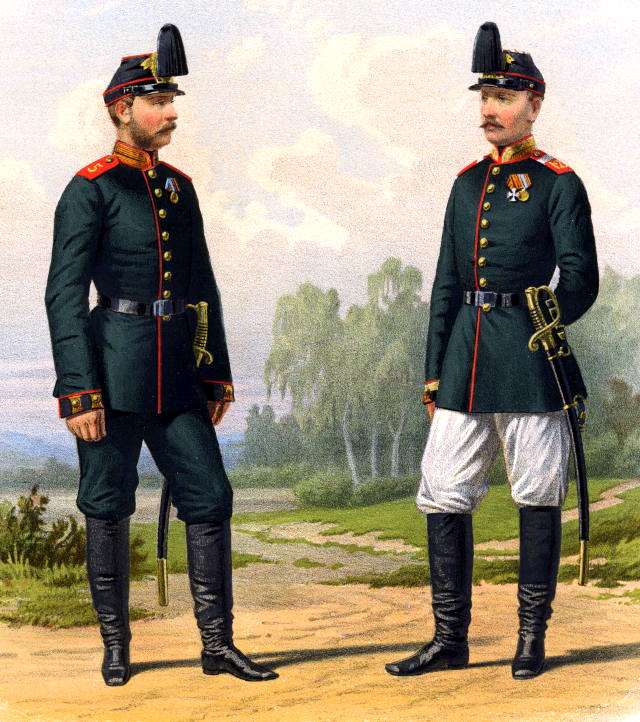
Kanonier (left) and Feuerwerker (right) of the Russian Imperial Army (1878)

Feuerwerker (ordnance technician or specialist, literally 'fire worker') are specialists in the armed forces of German-speaking countries responsible for the maintenance of ammunition.

From the late Middle Ages until the Early modern period a Feuerwerker was a highly specialised artisan with detailed knowledge of the closely guarded secrets of making gunpowder. Since the 19th century Feuerwerker became a distinguished career in Austrian, German and (Prussian Army influenced) Imperial Russian (Russian: Фейерверкер; Feyerverker) armed forces.

== Germany ==
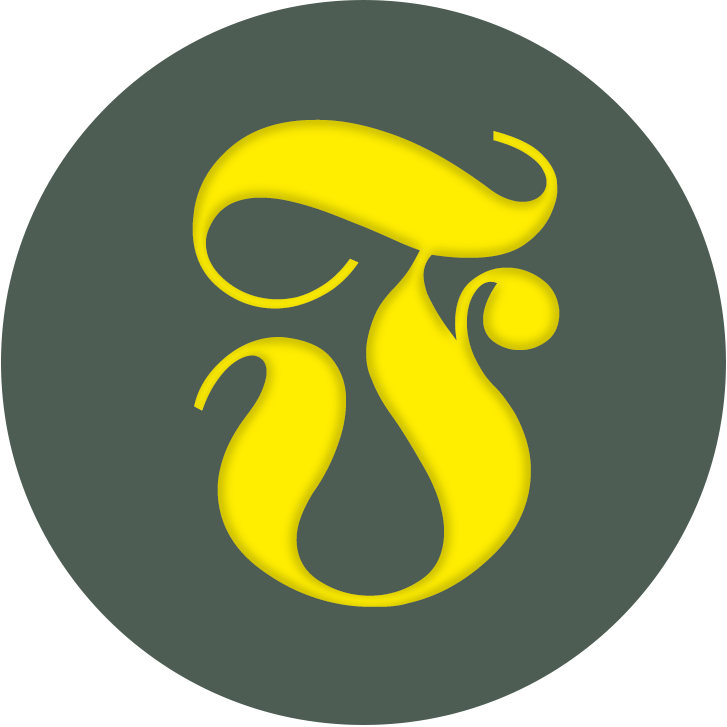
Wehrmacht (Heer) Specialty Badge for Pyrotechnician (Feuerwerker) worn on the lower right sleeve of the coat or overcoat.

The role of the Feuerwerker in German military history originated as a specialized artisan position tied to the advent of gunpowder warfare in the late Middle Ages, originally evolving into a formal non-commissioned officer (NCO), later also officer rank by the early modern period and persisting through the Wehrmacht era as ordnance and ammunition experts. During the late Middle Ages (roughly 14th–15th centuries), the introduction of gunpowder to Europe around 1326/1327 in German-speaking regions led to the emergence of Feuerwerker as civilian specialists.

Often recruited from gunsmith guilds, these "fire workers" possessed guarded knowledge of powder production, storage, and deployment for early cannons and handgonnes, serving princes, cities, or fortresses in siege warfare amid the fragmented Holy Roman Empire of the German Nation. Their expertise was critical in conflicts like the Hussite Wars (1419–1434), where innovative artillery tactics influenced German military practices.

In the early modern period (16th–18th centuries), as standing armies developed, Feuerwerker transitioned from artisans to military personnel, particularly in Prussian artillery under Frederick William I and Frederick the Great. They handled ammunition preparation, fuse setting, equipment maintenance, and gunner training, reflecting the professionalization of warfare amid the Thirty Years' War (1618–1648) and Seven Years' War (1756–1763), where German states emphasized technical specialization.

By the 19th century, in the Prussian Army and later Imperial German Army, Feuerwerker became a distinct rank, requiring specialized schooling in ordnance. Progression included Feuerwerker, Oberfeuerwerker, and even Feuerwerks-Leutnant for those passing officer exams, focused on ammunition depots, factories, and regiment staffs in artillery and infantry. This structure supported Otto von Bismarck's unification wars and World War I mobilization.

The Feuerwerker role later extended beyond NCO ranks to include officer equivalents in several German armies, reflecting the need for technical expertise in ordnance and ammunition handling. These positions often bridged warrant officer and subaltern levels, allowing specialized NCOs to advance through examinations without traditional officer commissioning paths. In the Prussian Army during the 19th century (and extending into the Imperial German Army after 1871), the Feuerwerker branch allowed highly qualified NCOs in artillery and ordnance specialties to advance through a distinct promotion ladder that included commissioned-equivalent ranks. This was achieved via rigorous technical examinations and service in specialized schools (e.g., the Feuerwerker-Schule), rather than the standard aristocratic or cadet route for line officers.

In the Reichswehr and Wehrmacht, the tradition continued with "Feuerwerker m. b. Offiziersprüfung" (ordnance specialists with officer qualification), though higher ranks like Hauptmann or Major equivalents became less common or were absorbed into broader technical officer paths (e.g., in munitions factories or bomb disposal). The emphasis shifted toward NCO-heavy Feuerwerker grades (Oberfeuerwerker, Stabsfeuerwerker, etc.), with officer-like status for proven experts. This progression underscores how German armies institutionalized technical specialization, creating a merit-based ladder for ordnance professionals that paralleled—but remained separate from—the general officer corps. These ranks underscored Germany's emphasis on ordnance specialization, evolving from artisanal roots to critical wartime functions.

In the modern German Bundeswehr, Feuerwerker is the collective designation to non-commissioned officers (OR5 to OR9) and officers of the military functional service (German: Offizier(e) militärfachlischer Dienst, OF1 and OF2) with several years of special training pertaining to construction, maintenance, and destruction of ammunition.

== Russian Imperial Army ==
Between 1700 and 1917, the ranks of Senior Feuerwerker (Senior Gunner) and Junior Feuerwerker (Vice-Feuerwerker, Junior Gunner) in the Russian Army were used in artillery. They were equal to the Junior and Senior Unteroffizier (Under Officer) in the land troops, respectively.

== Austro-Hungarian Empire ==
Feuerwerker was a military rank of the Austro-Hungarian Armed Forces (1867–1918).

In the Austro-Hungarian Armed Forces Feuerwerker was equivalent to:

- Beschlagmeister I. Klasse (Master-Blacksmith 1st class) cavalry,
- Feldwebel (en: Master-Sergeant) infantry,
- Oberjäger (en: Master-Sergeant) of the mountain troops,
- Rechnungs-Unteroffizier I. Klasse (en: Fiscal master-sergeant 1st class),
- Regimentshornist (en: Regiment bugler),
- Regimentstambour (en: Regiment drummer),
- Wachtmeister (en: Master-Sergeant) cavalry,
- Waffenmeister I. Klasse (en: Weapon master 1st class) artillery and weapon arsenal,
  - Einjährig-Freiwilliger-Feldwebel (en:Feldwebel - volunteer serving one year), and
  - Kadett-Feldwebel (Officers-Aspirant in rank of Master-Sergeant).

| Junior rank Zugsführer | (Austro-Hungarian armed forces rank); Feuerwerker | Senior rank Stabsfeuerwerker |

The rank insignia was a gorget patch on the stand-up collar of the so-called Waffenrock (en: tunic), and consisted of three white stars on 13 mm ragged yellow silk galloon. The gorget patch and the stand-up collar showed the particular Waffenfarbe (en: corps colour).

Examples (selection)

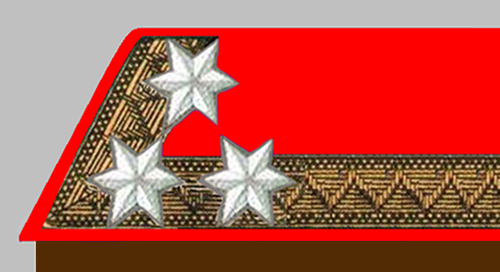
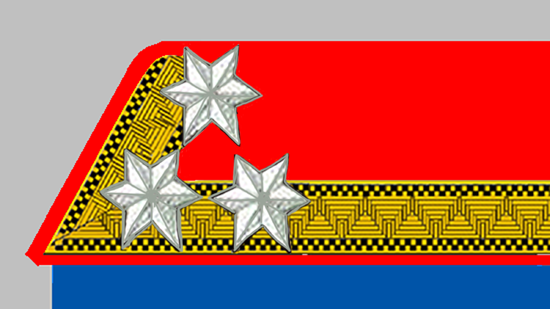
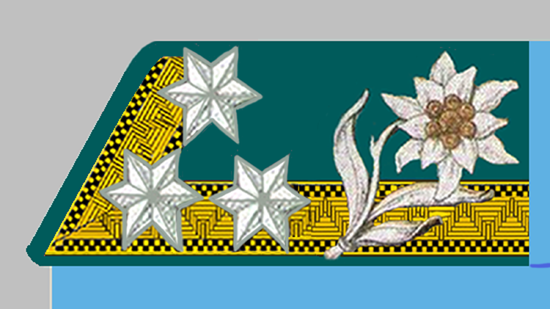
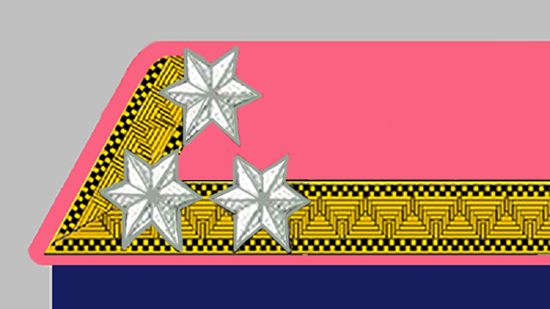
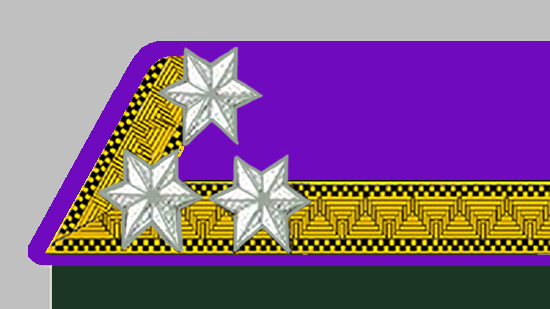
| Designation | Non-commissioned officers OR5/ Feldwebel ranks |
Paroli
| Rank description | Feuerwerker | Wachtmeister | Oberjäger | Feldwebel |
| Branch | Artillery | Cavalry | Mountain infantry | Infantry | Militärwachkorps |
| (English) | (Artillery Master Sergeant) | (Cavalry Master Sergeant) | (Rifles Master Sergeant) | (Sergeant) | (Master Sergeant of Military Guard Service) |
