= Wachtmeister =

Military rank of non-commissioned officers in Austria and Switzerland

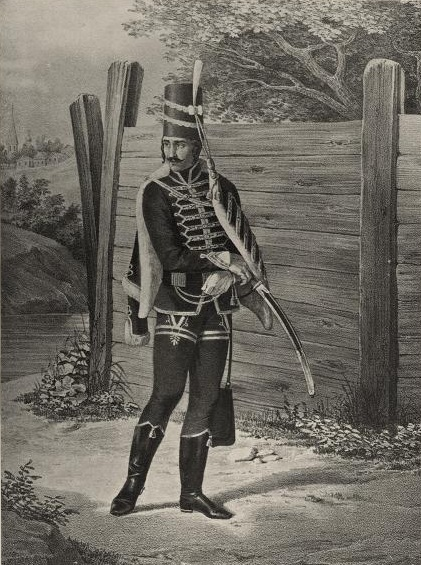
Hungarian Wachtmeister, hussar-regiment 18th century.

Wachtmeister (Wm; German for 'master-sentinel' or 'watch-master') is a military rank of non-commissioned officers (NCO) in Austria and Switzerland, with the Dutch variant (wachtmeester) used in cavalry, artillery and marechaussee branches of its armed forces. It is also used in civil authorities in German-speaking countries (police, judiciary, customs service, border protection). The Wachtmeister was initially responsible for the guard duty of the army. Later, it became the Feldwebel equivalent NCO-grade of the cavalry and artillery. Besides Austria and Switzerland today, the rank was also used elsewhere, for example in Germany, Russia, and Poland (wachmistrz).

In the German police service, Wachtmeister denoted the lowest rank; it was abolished in the 1980s, but is still the colloquial term referring to police patrolling in uniform.

== Historical background ==
The Wachtmeister was in the beginning responsible guard, sentry, or sentinel, responsible for the armies' guard duty. Later he became the Feldwebel equivalent NCO-grade of the cavalry and artillery.

In the Landsknecht armies and in the town of the 16th century, Wachtmeister was the official title to a «war experienced, skilful, and honest fellow», which was – in line to the order of his superior – responsible for the security of the military compound, or/and had to take care for the marching troops. He organized and controlled the guards, was responsible for discipline and attention, and took care for knowing the watchword. The watch service was provided almost by the cavalry, and often the mounted troops were responsible to guard the whole army, what was the case for instance in Brandenburg about 1620.

With the formation of standing armies, the designation Wachtmeister became of universally valid for the Feldwebel of the cavalry, later also of the artillery and other armed service branches. As regards to the three Feldwebel-ranks until 1945 there were the equivalent ranks Unterwachtmeister, Wachtmeister and Oberwachtmeister. Until 1970 in the GDR NPA the Feldwebel of the artillery was designated Wachtmeister.

== Austria ==
Wachtmeister
- Peaked cap

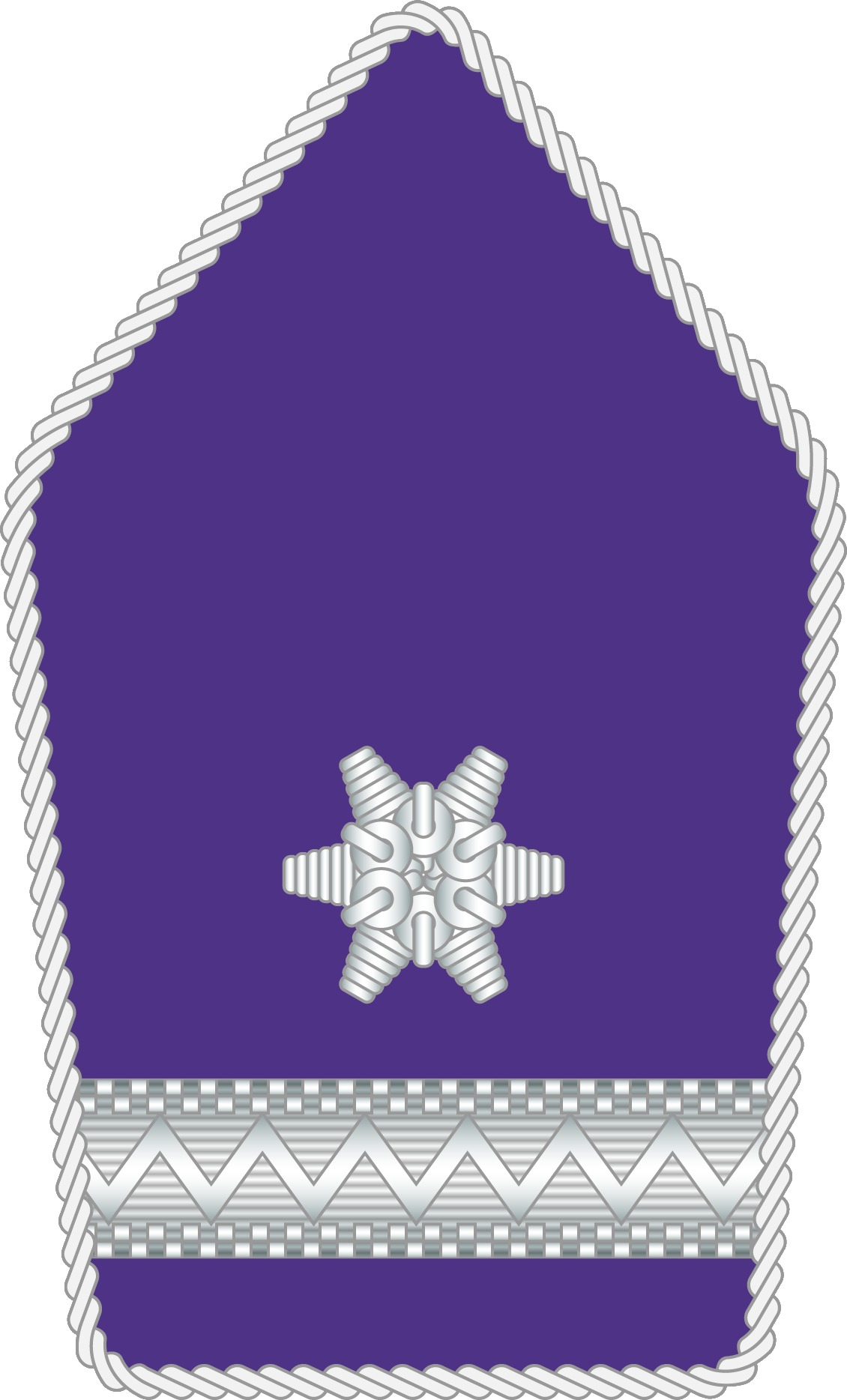
- Field uniform | service uniform
- Country: Austria
- Service branch: Austrian Armed Forces
- Abbreviation: Wm
- Rank group: Junior NCO (Unteroffiziere)
- Non-NATO rank: OR-5
- Formation: 1857
- Next higher rank: Oberwachtmeister
- Next lower rank: Zugsführer

Until the 1970s year the artillery and air defence troops used the designation Feuerwerker instead of Wachtmeister. Today, the Wachtmeister is the lowest NCO-rank (assignment group M BUO 2 / professional NCO; respectively M ZUO 2 / longer-serving volunteer) in the Austrian Bundesheer. The Wachtmeister will normally be deployed as a leader (Austrian: Kommandant) of a squad (8 to 13 soldiers).

Regarding the promotion to the rank there are three possibilities:

- First: to pass (successfully) the one year NCO-course on the Heeresunteroffiziersakademie (HUAk) of the Bundesheer in Enns
- Second: by finishing / at the end of the so-called make good training (de: Nachholausbildung)
- Third: by finishing the first part of the officers' training programme.

=== Austro-Hungarian Armed Forces ===
Wachtmeister was a cavalry rank of the Austro-Hungarian Armed Forces (1867–1918). It was comparable to Cavalry Master-sergeant in Anglophone armed forces.

In the Austro-Hungarian Armed Forces Wachtmeister was equivalent to:

- Beschlagmeister I. Klasse (Master-Blacksmith 1st class) cavalry,
- Feldwebel (en: Master-sergeant) infantry,
- Feuerwerker (Master-sergeant) artillery,
- Oberjaeger (Master-Sergeant) of the mountain troops,
- Rechnungs-Unteroffizier I. Klasse (Fiscal master-sergeant 1st class),
- Regimentshornist (Regiment bugler),
- Regimentstambour (Regiment drummer),
- Waffenmeister I. Klasse (Weapon master 1st class) artillery and weapon arsenal,
  - Einjährig-Freiwilliger-Feldwebel (Feldwebel – volunteer serving one year), and
  - Kadett-Feldwebel (Officers-Aspirant).

Junior rank Zugsführer	(Austro-Hungarian armed forces rank); Wachtmeister	Senior rank Stabswachtmeister

Then rank insignia was a gorget patch on the stand-up collar of the so-called Waffenrock (en: tunic), and consisted of three white stars on 13 mm ragged yellow silk galloon. The gorget patch and the stand-up collar showed the particular Waffenfarbe (en: corps colour).

Examples (selection)

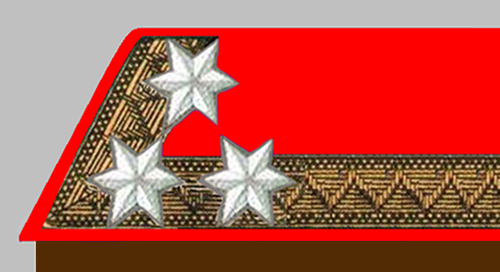
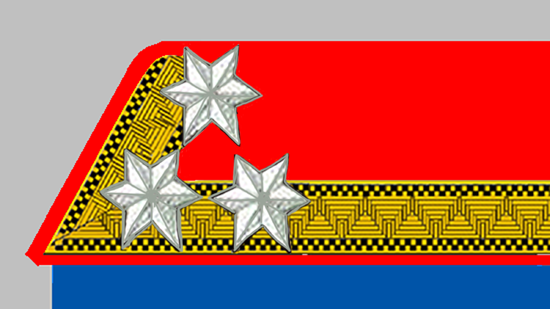
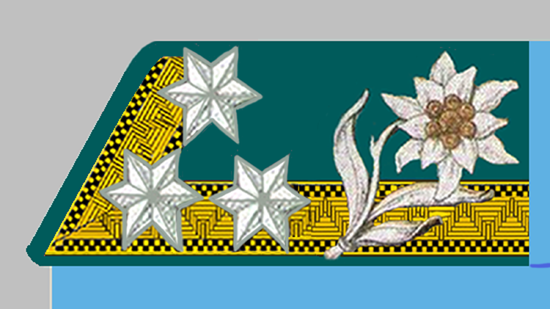
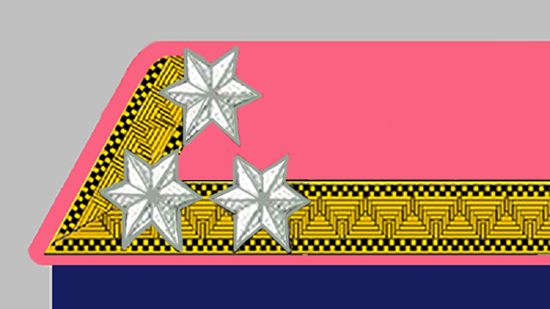
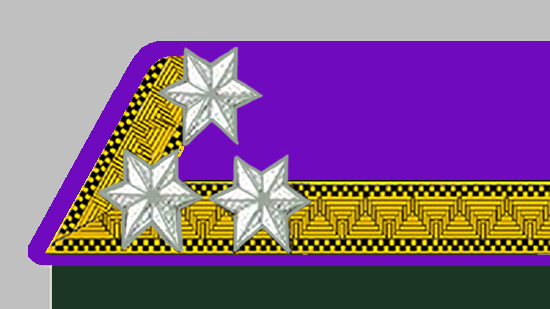
Designation	Non-commissioned officers/ Feldwebel ranks
Paroli
Rank description	Feuerwerker	Wachtmeister	Oberjäger	Feldwebel
Branch	Artillery	Cavalry	Mountainers infantry	Infantry	Military Guard Corps

== Germany ==
Similarly to the company sergeant major appointment to army units (de: Kompaniefeldwebel / popularly: Spiess), the NCOs with port épée on board larger warships wears the designation «Wachtmeister». Among other responsibilities, he might be required to deal with S1 (coordinating staff area – personnel service) obligations. Assigned to this role will be experienced port épée NCOs up to the rank of Hauptbootsmann (OR7) or higher.

In the German army ground forces, the designation of the Feldwebel rank of Cavalry and Artillery was the «Wachtmeister» until 1945.

In the GDR National People's Army (NPA), the «Wachtmeister» was replaced by Feldwebel in 1970.

In the Imperial German Navy, Reichsmarine, and Kriegsmarine, the lowest port épée NCO rank of the sea operations divisions was named «Wachtmeister» as well. However, the equivalent rank of land operations divisions was named Feldwebel.

Service	Shoulder	Higher/lower rank
Feuerschutzpolizei		Oberwachtmeister Rottwachtmeister
Luftschutzpolizei		Oberwachtmeister Rottwachtmeister
Ordnungspolizei		Oberwachtmeister Rottmeister
Ordnungspolizei		Oberwachtmeister Rottwachtmeister
Verwaltungspolizei		Revieroberwachtmeister
Wasserschutzpolizei		Oberwachtmeister Rottwachtmeister
Zollgrenzschutz		Zolloberwachtmeister Zollgrenzangestellter

=== National People's Army ===
In the GDR National People's Army (NPA) the «Wachtmeister» was replaced by the universal rank designation Feldwebel. The equivalent rank of the Volksmarine (en: People's Navy) was the Meister of the Volksmarine.

Junior Rank; Unterwachtmeister (Unterfeldwebel)	National People's Army rank Wachtmeister (Feldwebel)	Senior Rank; Oberwachtmeister (Oberfeldwebel)

== Netherlands ==
In the cavalry, artillery and marechaussee branches of the Dutch military forces, sergeants are referred to as wachtmeester. In the same branches the rank of sergeant major is referred to as opperwachtmeester.

== Poland ==
In Poland, "Wachmistrz" was a sergeant serving in cavalry.

== Russia ==
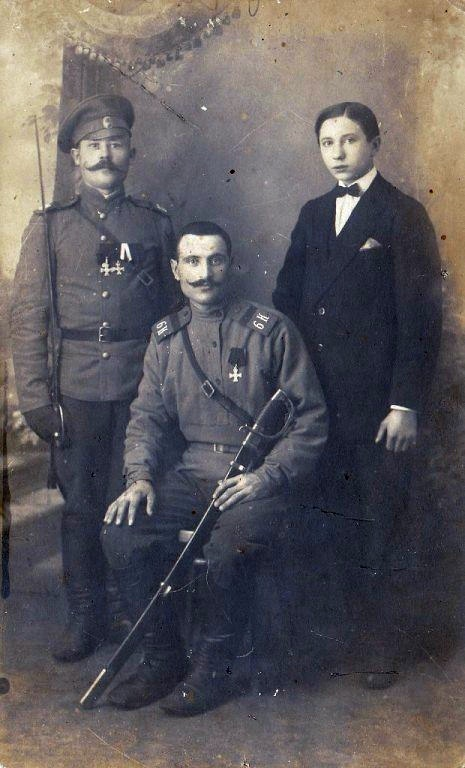
Vlasenko Ilia (1886–1935). Wachtmeister of the Separate Corps of Border Guards of the Russian Empire, Kybartai (pre-1915)

To the Russian Army, the rank of Wachtmeister (ru: Ва́хмистр / Vakhmistr) was adopted in 1711, by order of the Tsar Peter the Great. Until 1877, there were the unofficial ranks of starshij vakhmistr (Старший ва́хмистр) and mladshij vakhmistr (Младший ва́хмистр) in order to identify and distinguish between what could be called platoon non-commissioned officers.

The Wachtmeister was responsible for providing support to the troop commander, which normally was Rittmeister (cavalry captain, roughly equivalent to OF-2) Among a Wachtmeister’s responsibilities were basic unit training, command task training, service support, and the maintenance of unit morale.

The German equivalent to the Russian Wachtmeister was the infantry Feldwebel. Until 1826, it was the highest non-commissioned officer rank, and superior to all subordinate NCOs. In 1826 the so-called “old” Oberwachtmeisters were counted to the senior officers’ rank group in line with the Russian rank table (XIV, before XIII). However, the reorganisation was never accepted in practical usage, although such a position would have been equivalent to the rank of cornet.

Sequence of ranks
junior rank: Junior NCO	Wachtmeister (Feldwebel)	senior rank: Podpraporshchik

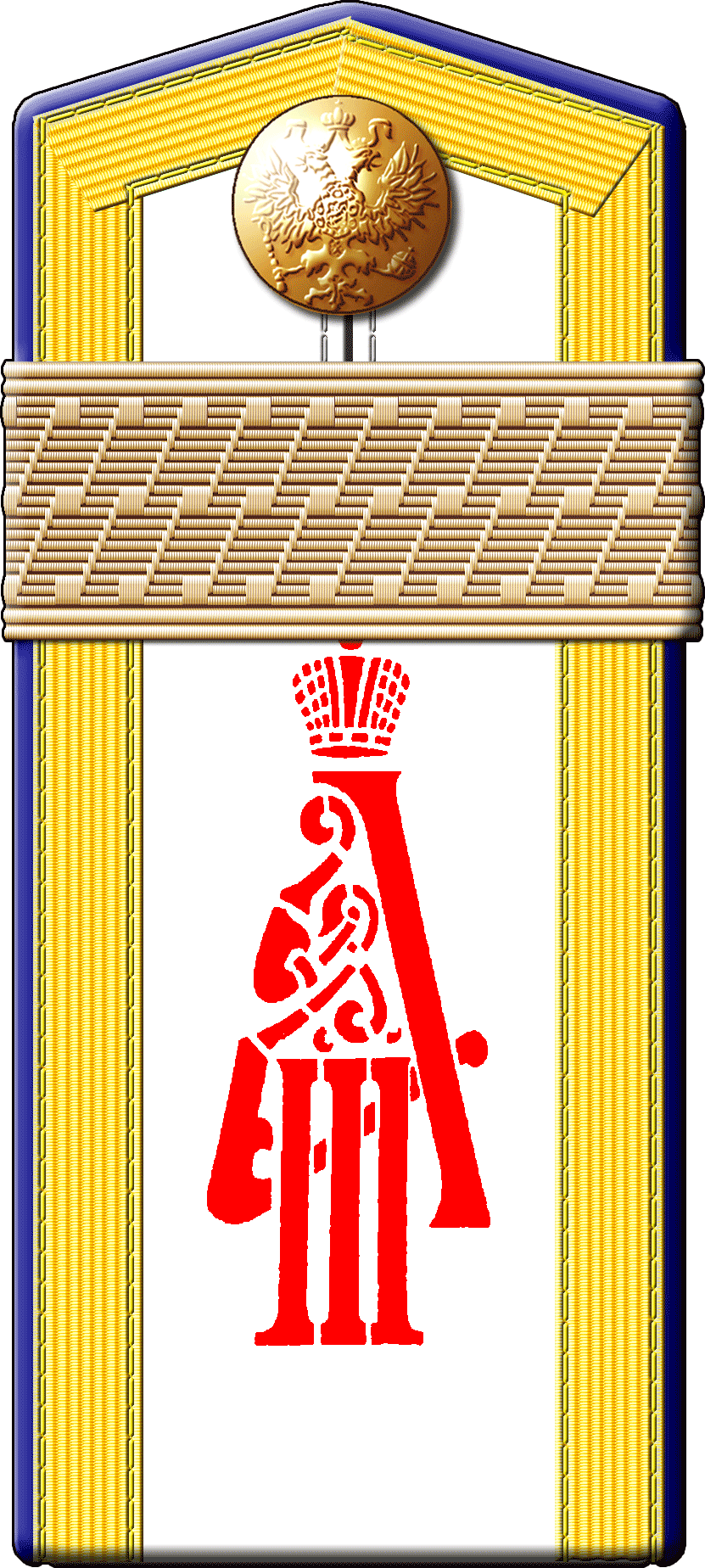
Wachtmeiter (longer serving), design 1911

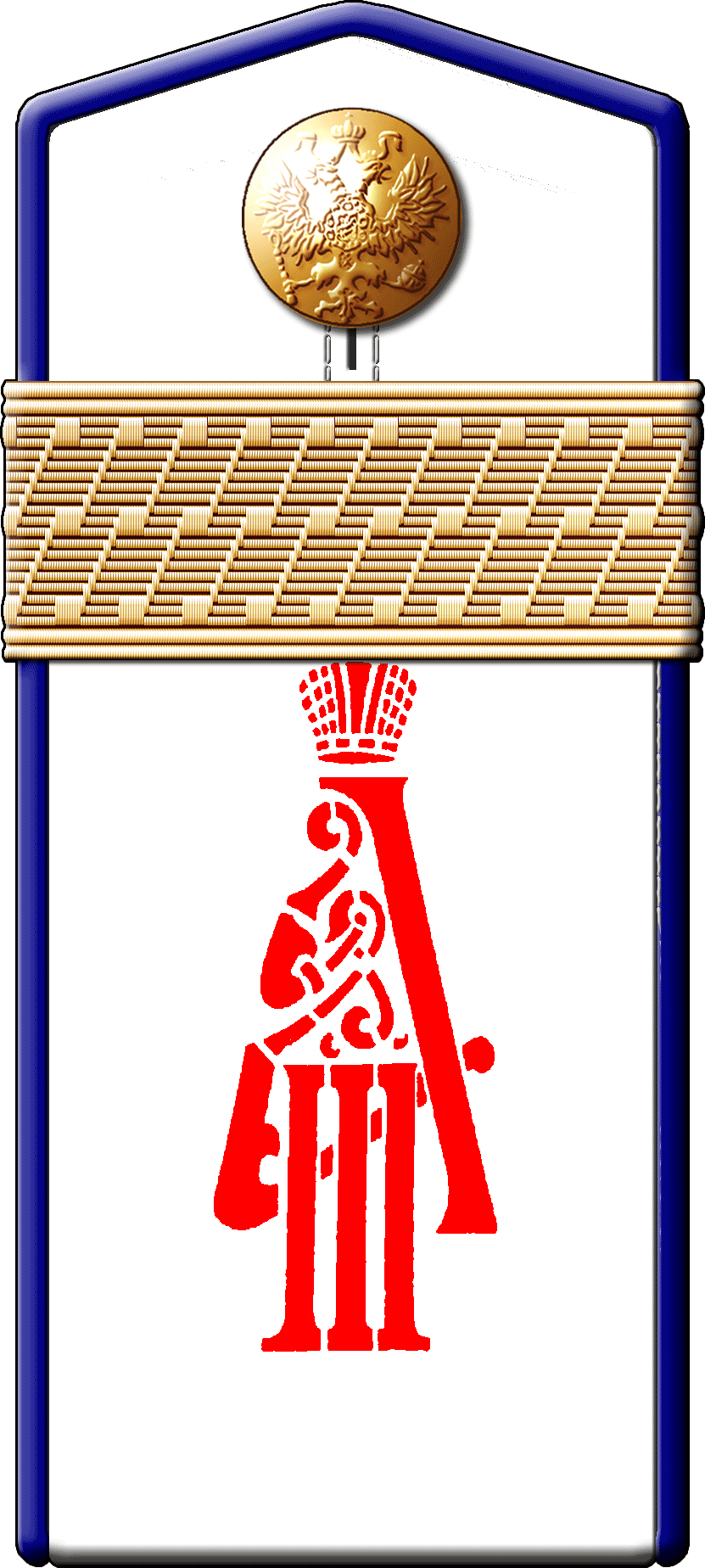
shoulder board, design 1908

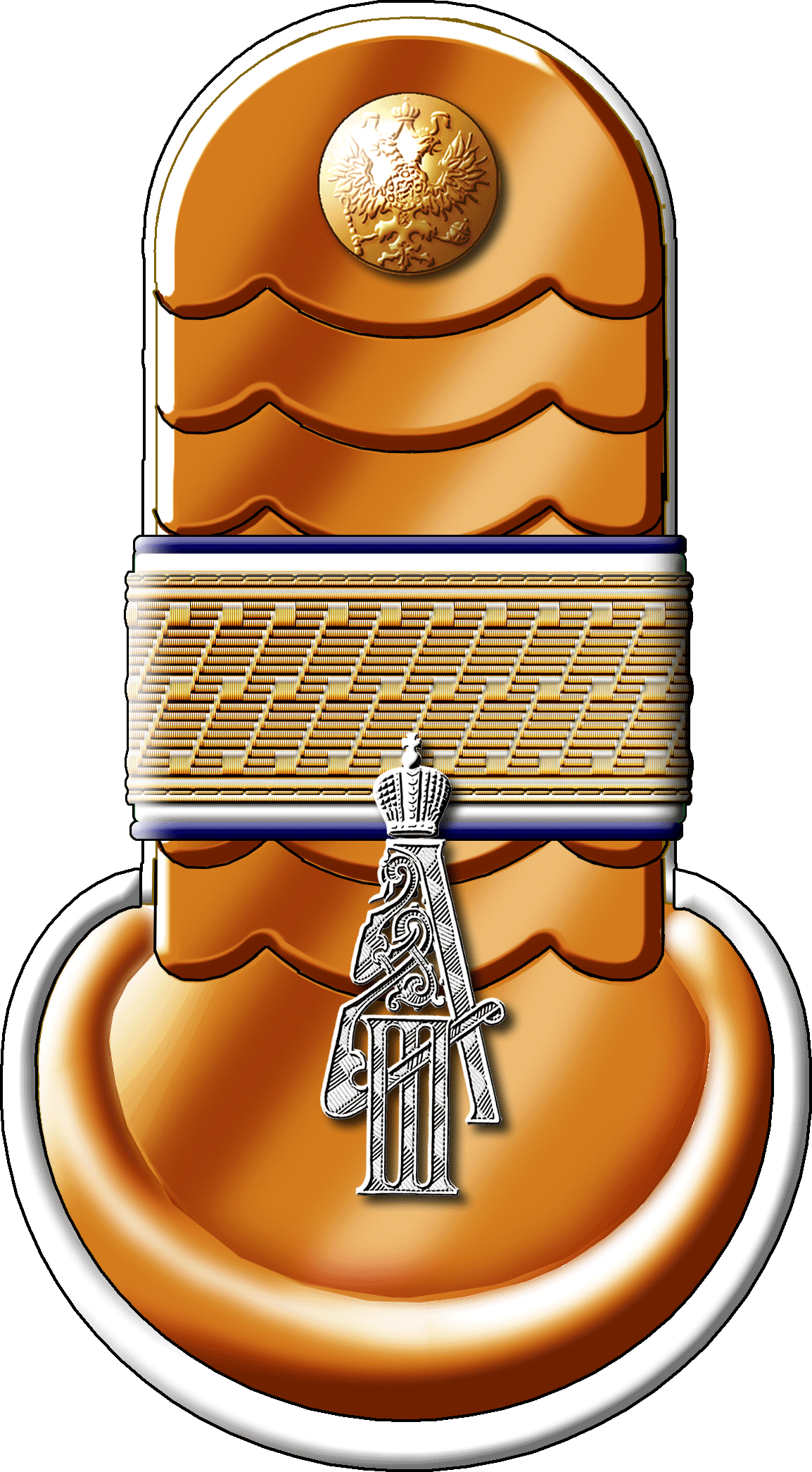
epaulette, design 1908

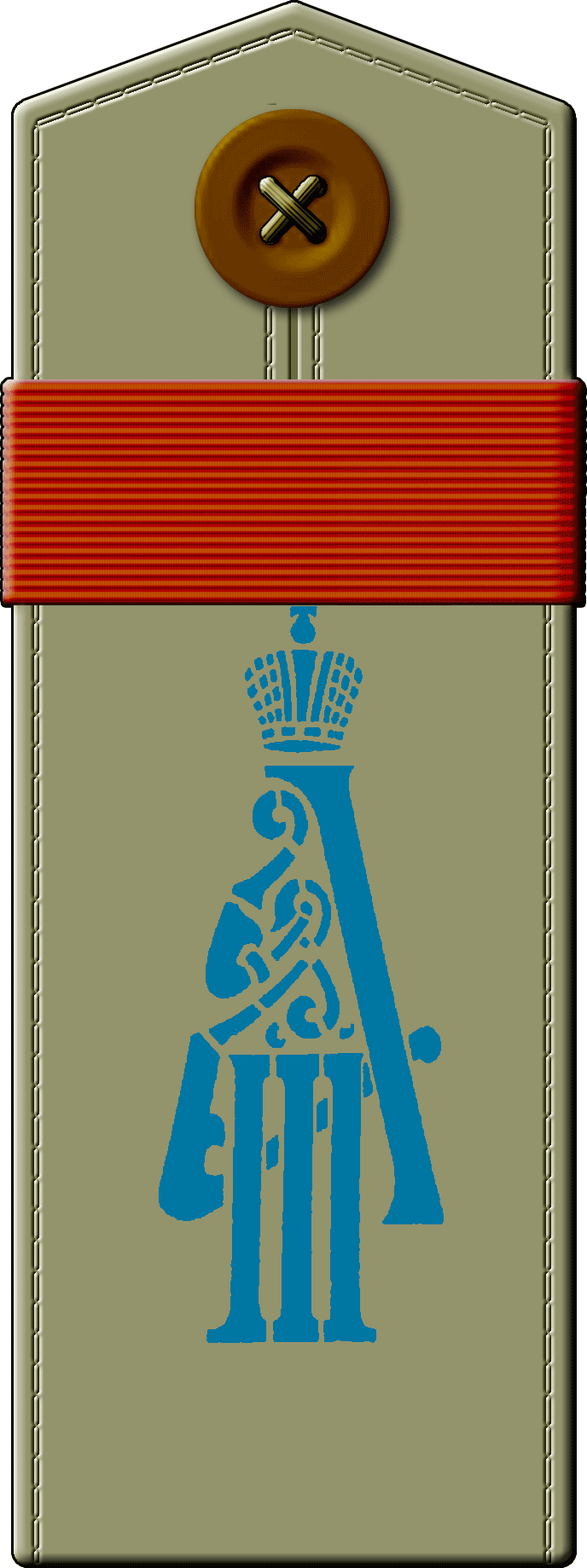
shoulder board, field design 1911

== Switzerland ==
Wachtmeister
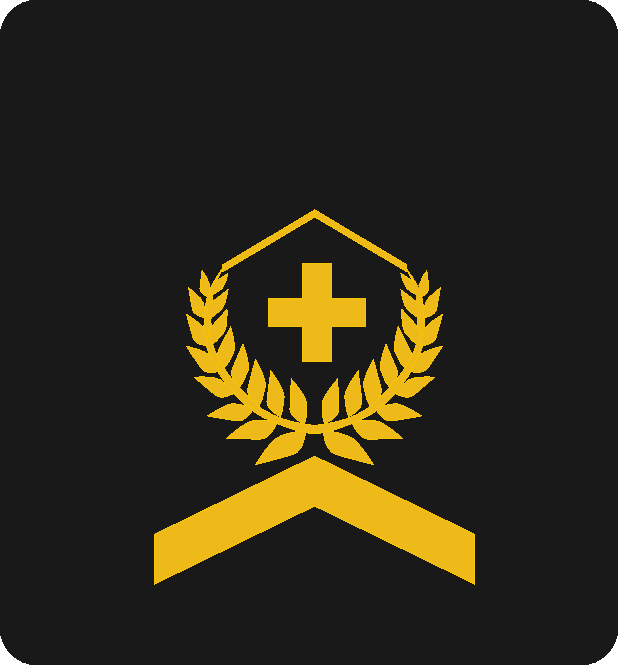
- Swiss and Swiss guard insignia
- Country: Switzerland; Vatican
- Service branch: Swiss Armed Forces (SAF); Swiss Guard (SG)
- Rank group: Non-commissioned officer
- Next higher rank: Oberwachtmeister (SAF); Feldweibel (SG)
- Next lower rank: Korporal (SAF & SG)

In the Military of Switzerland the Wachtmeister (abbr. Wm, French: sergent, Italian: sergente) is a non-commissioned officer rank. The rank is higher than a Korporal, and lower than an Oberwachtmeister.

Until the so-called Army reform XXI (in effect from 1 January 2004), the rank was regularly assigned to a Zugführer-Stellvertreter (deputy platoon leader). However, in 2014, a newly appointed Wachtmeister was to be a squad leader or vehicle leader (Gruppenführer, Wagenkommandant), e.g. a gun commander (Geschützführer).

In United Nations missions and in NATO Partnership for Peace, the rank Wachtmeister will be designated in English with Sergeant (Sgt).
