= Waffenfarbe (Austria) =

Colors of the Austrian army

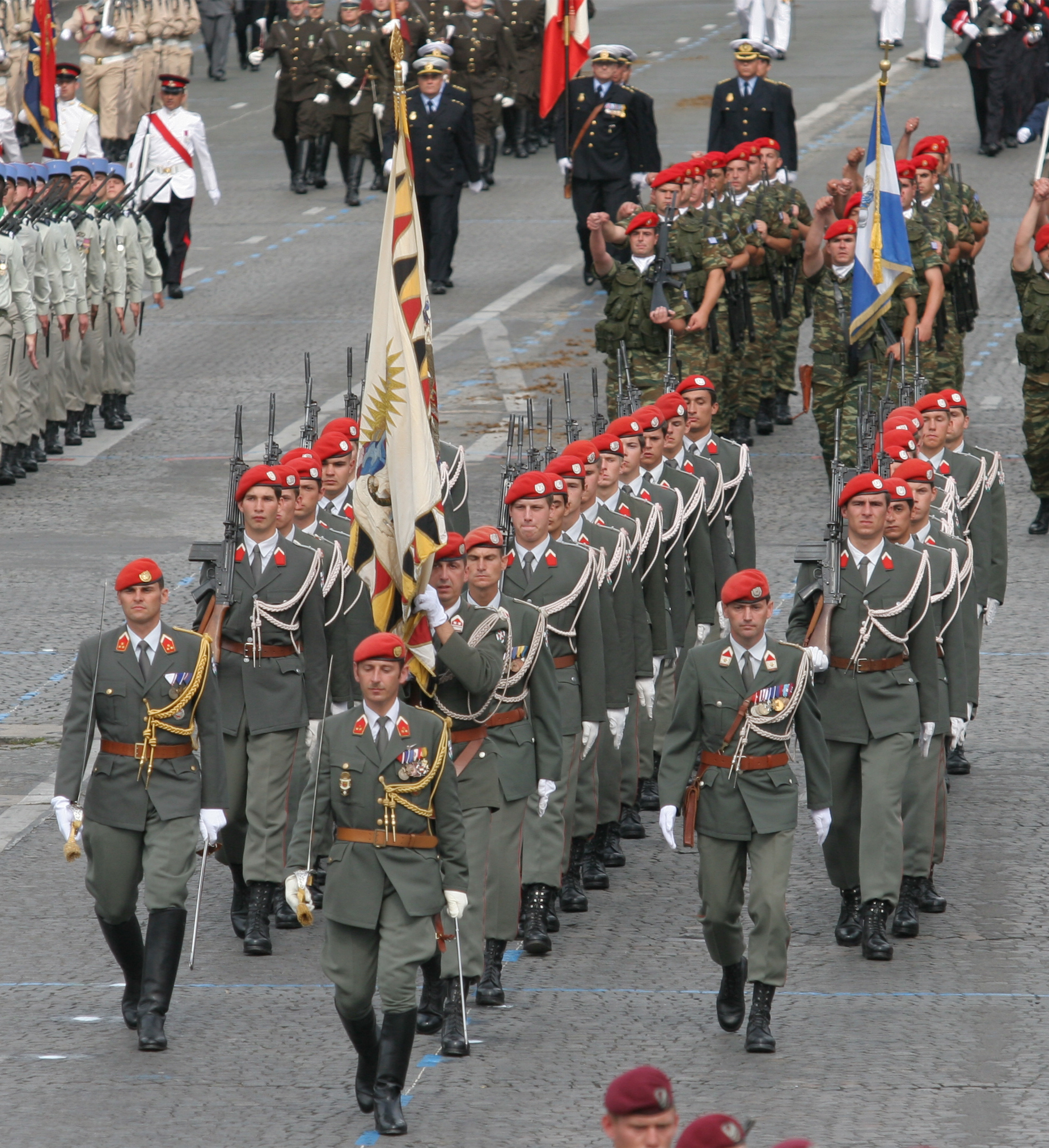
Austrian Guard Company showing basic Waffenfarben of the Austrian uniform and Guards Waffenfarbe.

Waffenfarbe(n) or Egalisierungsfarbe(n) are colors that communicate the rank and arm of service for members of the police force or the Federal Army of the Republic of Austria (de: Bundesheer der Republik Österreich) . They are also referred to as Kragenspiegel (English: collar patches or gorget patches).

== History ==
In 1920/21, the Austrian Federal Army of the First Republic adopted German Reichswehr uniforms along with their Waffenfarben, albeit with two notable exceptions: the Austrian infantry adopted grass-green, and the Austrian hunter troops adopted yellow-green (German colors were white for infantry and hunter-green for hunter troops). A new uniform was introduced in 1933 modeled on those worn by the Austro-Hungarian Land forces from 1867 to 1914. The so-called k.u.k. "Adjustierungsvorschrift" (English: service dress instruction) contains color pattern tables from the year 1912 and regulated the Egalisierungsfarben to be worn.

== Austrian Federal Army Waffenfarben ==
=== Rank insignia Beret colors ===
Troops, unit, appointment	Waffenfarbe	Example (Paroli)	Rank (NATO code)	Rank (Austrian title)
Guards	scharlachrot mit weißem Vorstoß (English: scarlet(-red) with white edging strip)		OR-8	Oberstabswachtmeister
Jagdkommando (English: skirmishing command); Heeresportzentrum (Army Sports Center)	gelbgün (yellow-green)		OR-3	Korporal
Jäger (rifleman)	grasgrün (meadow green) (index #00703E)		OF-1a	Oberleutnant
Panzer (armour); Panzergrenadiere (panzergrenadiers)	schwarz (black)		OF-1b	Leutnant
Aufklärer (reconnaissance)	gelb (yellow)		OR-7	Stabswachtmeister
Theresian Military Academy	rot (red)		OF-D	Fähnrich
Artillery; Air defense; AD academy	rot (red)		OR-9	Offizierstellvertreter
Engineer troops	stahlgrün (steel green)		OR-4	Zugsführer
NBC-Defense	hechtgrau (pike gray)		OR-2	Gefreiter
Communicators	rostbraun (rust brown)		OR-9	Vizeleutnant
Technical service	braun (brown)		OF-2	Hauptmann
Air Force (e.g. pilots)	violett (violet)		OR-5	Wachtmeister
Higher mil. technical service	braun mit rotem Vorstoß (en: brown with red edging strip)	N/A		
Higher mil. expert service	rot-blau (en: red blue)		OF-3	Major
General staff service	red-black	N/A		
Intendance service	green deep-red	N/A		
Logistic	deep-blue	N/A		
Mil. medical service (human medicine)	blue black		OF-3	Majorarzt
Mil. medical service (veterinary medicine)	deep-red black		OF-5	Oberstveterinär
Mil. medical service (pharmacology)	lilac black	N/A		
Medical service	sky blue		OR-6	Oberwachtmeister
Wirtschaftsdienst (support service)	hellblau light blue (index #007BA7)		OF-4	Oberstleutnant
General officers	goldfarben gold colored (index #d0a34f)			General rank insignia OF6-9 on peaked cap
basic uniform colors	jacket: field gray; trousers: stone gray		OR-2	Gefreiter

=== Beret colors ===
Austrian Bundesheer often wear berets. Normally, it will be worn to the dress uniform or on special occasions to the field suit. Exempted are only members of the Air Force and the Gebirgsjäger (en: mountain infantry) with an own headgear. The color of the particular beret corresponds to the appropriate branch of service and/or the particular unit or formation. The color of the Bundesadler (federal eagle) and the eagle double-wing on berets is as follows:

- Metallic gray - recruits and charges (OR-1 to OR-4)
- Silver - NCOs (OR-5 to OR-9)
- Gold - officers (OR-1 to OF-5)
- Gold on red background - general officers (OF-6 to OF-9)

Troops, unit, appointment	Caps color	Example	Mainly used by
Jägertruppe (motorized infantry); Panzergrenadiertruppe (mechanized infantry); Pioniertruppe (military engineers)	jaegergreun (rifleman-green)		Infantrymen (not: Jägerbataillon 25); members of the territorial organization; military schools and academy (not: Heereslogistikschule)
Panzertruppe (armored corps); Panzergrenadiertruppe (mechanized infantry); Panzerartillerietruppe (self-propelled artillery)	schwarz (black)		members of the armored corps, most members of the 3rd - and 4th Mechanized infantry brigade. The image shows an armored officer's beret with golden federal eagle
Garde (guards)	scharlachrot (scarlet-red)		members of the Guards battalion
Red beret	rot (red)		members of 25th Jaegerbataillon in Klagenfurt.
Coral-red beret	Korallrot (coral-red)		members of the military patrols and military police
Rusty-brown beret	Rostbaraun (rusty-brown)		members of the combat support troops
Pike-gray beret	Hechtgrau (pike gray)		members of the NBC-defense school and the "Austrian Forces Disaster Relief Unit"
Dark-blue beret	Dunkelblau (dark-blue)		members of the Army logistics school, Combat support command (with all subordinate elements), and the Military Medical Center
Yellow-green beret	Gelbgruen (yellow-green)		Federal army's top performing athletes (German: Bundesheer-Leistungssportler) of the Army Sports Center (Heeres-Sportzentrum)
Olive-green beret (with federal eagle)	Olivegruen (olive-green)		members of the Skirmishing command (basic level distinguished by federal eagle)
Olive-green beret (with Skirmishing patrol badge)	Olivegruen (olive-green)		members of the Skirmishing command that passed the basic Skirmishing command trainings course (advanced level – the federal eagle is replaced by the Skirmishing command badge)
Blue UN beret	UN-blue		soldiers on duty to, contract of, or by order of the United Nations.

== Federal police ==
The Bundespolizei uses corps colors on the rank insignia and Tellerkappe (English: peaked cap).

- Most police wear Krapprot (madder red)
- Higher service (police legal advisor and public health official) wear Bordeauxviolett (Bordeaux red)

== K.u.k. Egalisationfarben ==
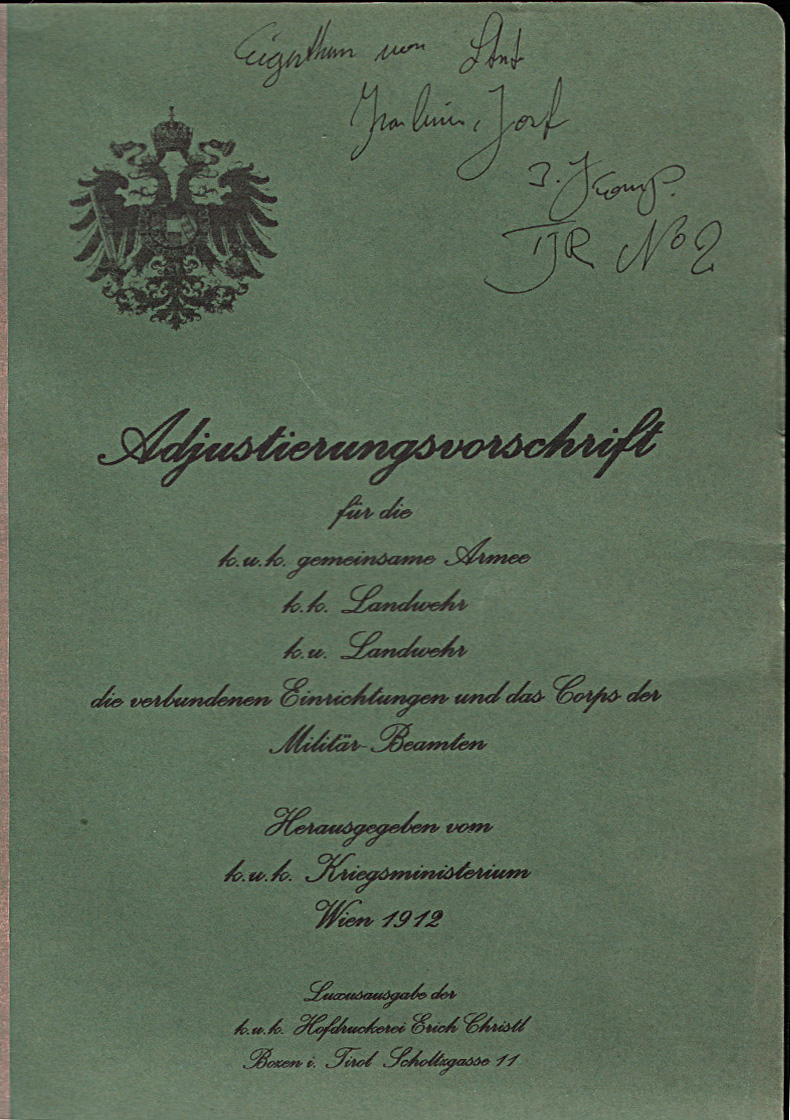
K.u.k. Adjustation instruction (de: Adjustierungsvorschrift), edition 1912.

The Adjustierungsvorschrift (English: service dress instruction) contains the color pattern tables from the year 1912. The name Egalisierung consists of uniform color at the one hand, and corps color, Waffenfarbe or badge color at the other hand. The system was extremely complicated and was called by slang Farbkastel (English: paintbox). Ultimately, in the k.u.k. common army it was very difficult to distinguish the 102 infantry regiments from Hussars, Lancers or Dragoons, as well as services, service branches, special services, appointments, and so on.

Color

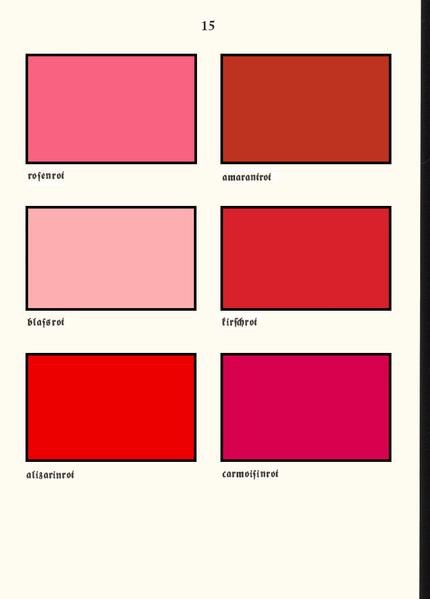
table 1

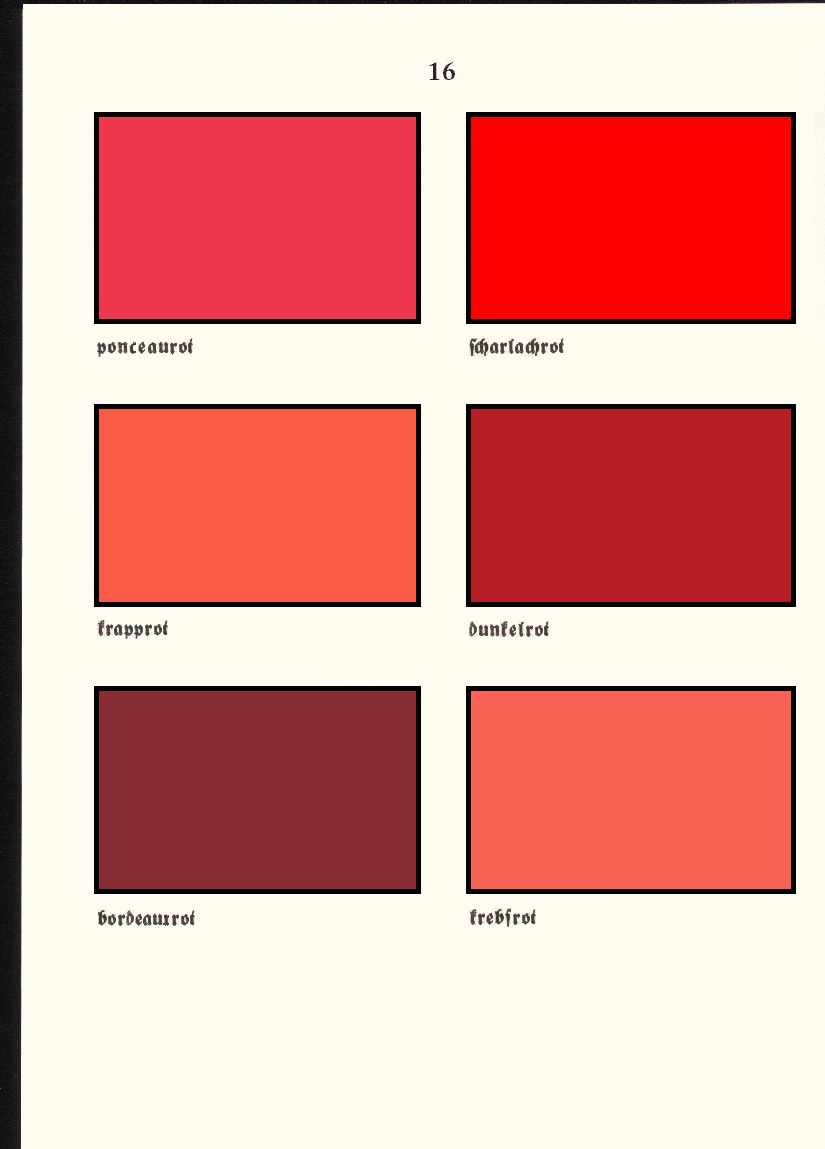
table 2

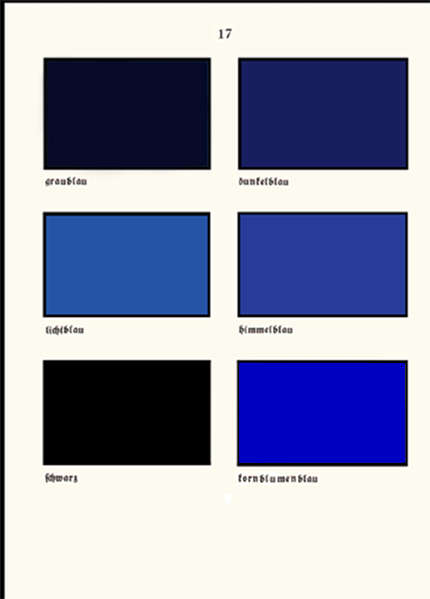
table 3

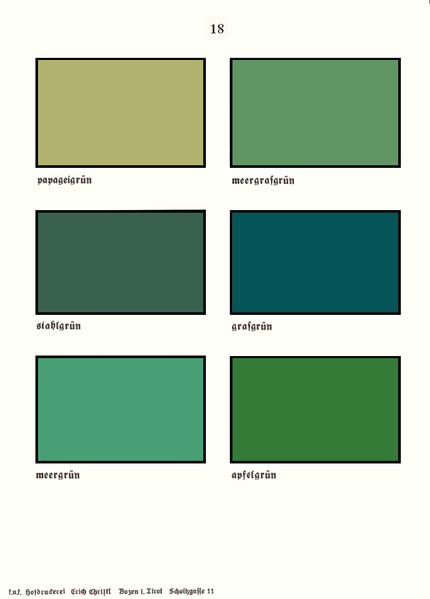
table 4

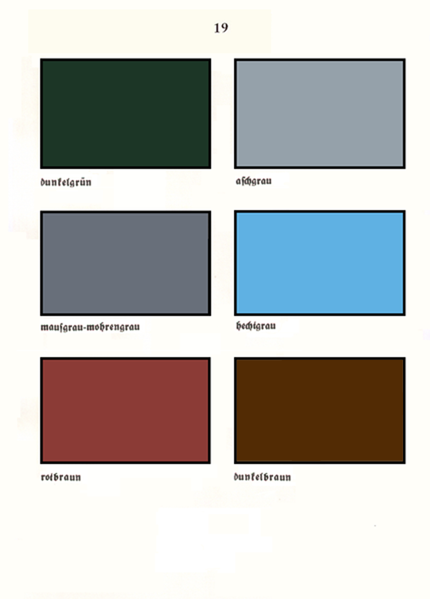
table 5

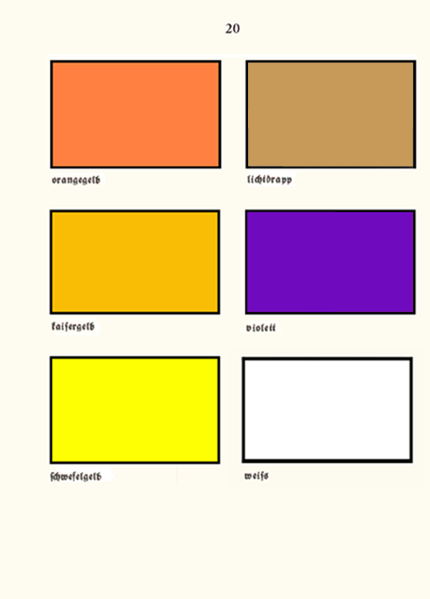
table 6

== See also ==
- Wehrmacht ranks and insignia
- Corps colours of the German Army (1935–1945)
- Corps colours of the Luftwaffe (1935–1945)
- Corps colours (Waffen-SS) – Nazi military insignia (1938–1945)
- Ranks of the Austrian Bundesheer
- Waffenfarbe – Visual method used by the armed forces of Germany
- Adjustierung – Service dress of the Austrian army

== Sources ==
- Schriften des Heeresgeschichtlifhen Museums in Wien Das k.u.k. Heer im Jahre 1895 Edition Leopold Stocker Graz 1997 ISBN 3-7020-0783-0
- Rest, Ortner, Illming Des Kaisers Rock im 1. Weltkrieg Edition Militaria Vienna 2002 ISBN 3-9501642-0-0
