= ZGF =

ZGF or Zgf may refer to:

- Zugsführer, a rank in the Austrian Armed Forces
- ZGF, the IATA code for Grand Forks Airport, British Columbia, Canada.
- ZGF Architects, an American architectural firm
