= Stabskorporal =

German military rank

- Heer, Luftwaffe shoulder and Marine sleeve insignia
- Country: Germany
- Service branch: German Army; German Navy; German Air Force
- Abbreviation: TBA
- Rank: German enlisted rank
- NATO rank code: OR-4
- Formation: 2021
- Next higher rank: Unteroffizier
- Next lower rank: Korporal

Stabskorporal (transl. Staff corporal) is the highest enlisted rank in the German Bundeswehr, that might be comparable to (senior) corporal (OR-4) in British Commonwealth armed forces. However, as distinguished from the corporal in Commonwealth armed forces, the Stabskorporal belongs to the rank group of enlisted men.

== History ==
The ranks Korporal and Stabskorporal were introduced by Bundeswehr in October 2021 as the new most senior ranks for enlisted men, senior to Oberstabsgefreiter. Pay grade of Stabskorporal is A6 mit Zulage (with extra pay), that is the same pay grade as the NCO rank Stabsunteroffizier (OR-5).

Soldiers have to have served for at least one year in the rank of Korporal before being considered for promotion.
