= Korporal =

Germanic variant of the English Corporal

Korporal is the German and Danish spelling of the English corporal. Korporal is used in a number of armed forces as the lowest rank of the non-commissioned officers group. However, in the German Bundeswehr, it is considered a high enlisted personnel rank. In Switzerland the rank is used in the Fire Department as well.

In former German armed forces, the designation of the lowest NCO rank was "Corporal".

== Austria ==
Korporal
- Peaked cap

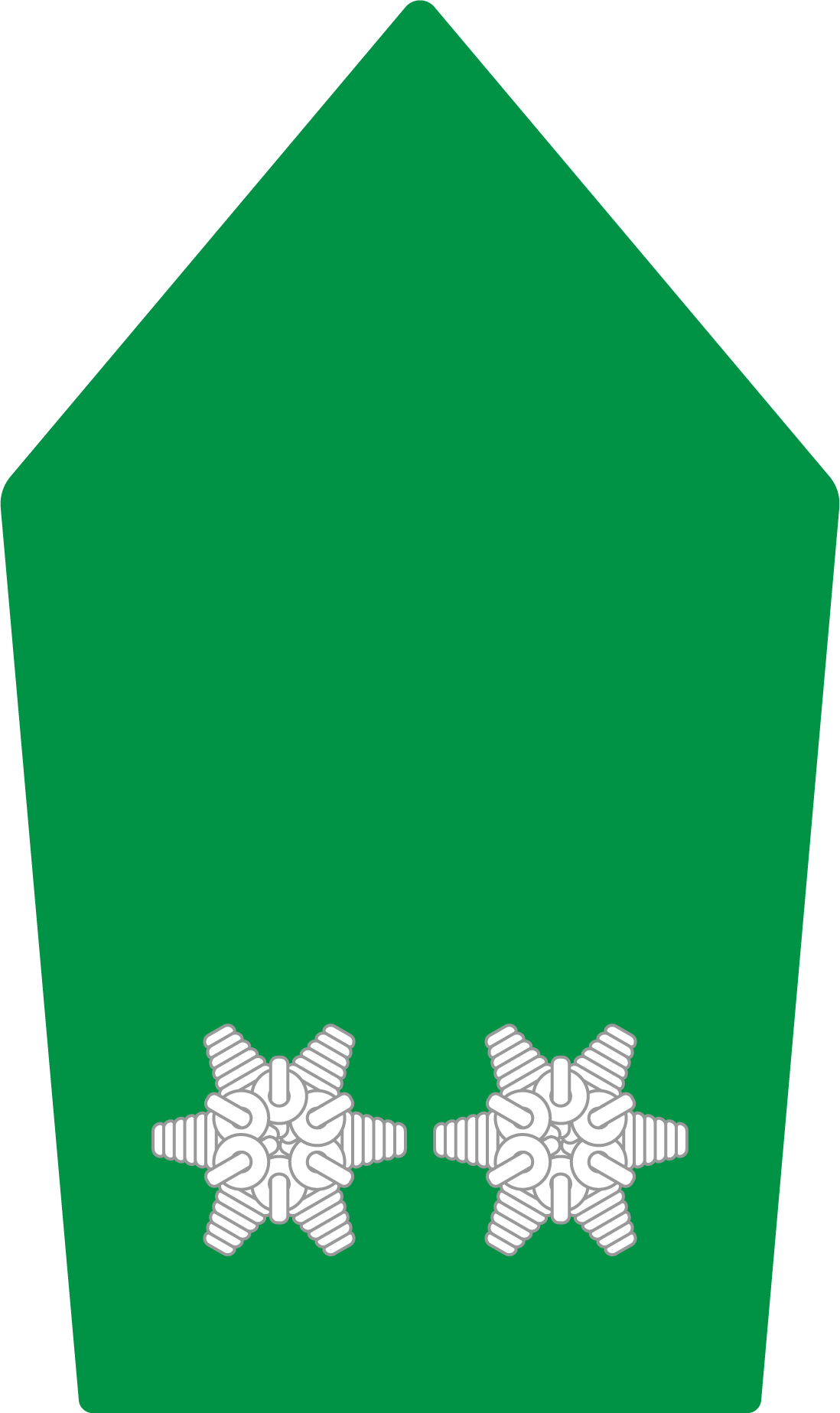
- Field uniform | service uniform
- Country: Austria
- Service branch: Austrian Armed Forces
- Non-NATO rank: OR-3
- Formation: 1867
- Next higher rank: Zugsführer
- Next lower rank: Gefreiter

Korporal (Kpl) is a rank of the enlisted men rank group (EN group) in the Austrian Bundesheer. In the k.u.k Army it still counted to the NCO rank group and was allowed to wear the yellow-black port epée.

Today and in the comparison to the German Bundeswehr it is equivalent to the EN-rank “Hauptgefreiter/ Stabsgefreiter ”. In peacetime the Korporal might be tasked to command a small sub unit, e.g. a fireteam (de: Trupp, 2 to 8 men) or a squad (de: Gruppe, 8-13 men).

=== k.u.k. Army ===
Korporal (Hungarian: Tizedes) was also a rank of the k.u.k. Austro-Hungarian Army. Rank insignia were two white celluloid-star on the stand-up collar of the Waffenrock on gorget patch (German: Paroli). Stand-up collar and background of the gorget patch showed a particular egalisation colour. This rank was corresponding to the ranks of enlisted men as follows:

- Bataillonshornist (Battalion bugler)
- Bataillonstambour (Battalion drummer)
- Geschütz-Vormeister (Gunner-corporal) artillery
- Gewehr-Vormeister (Machinegun-corporal ) infantry
- Unterjäger (Rifles-corporal) mountain troops
- Waffenmeister 3. Klasse (Weapon master 3rd class) artillery and weapon arsenal

Korporal in adjutation of the k.u.k. infantry

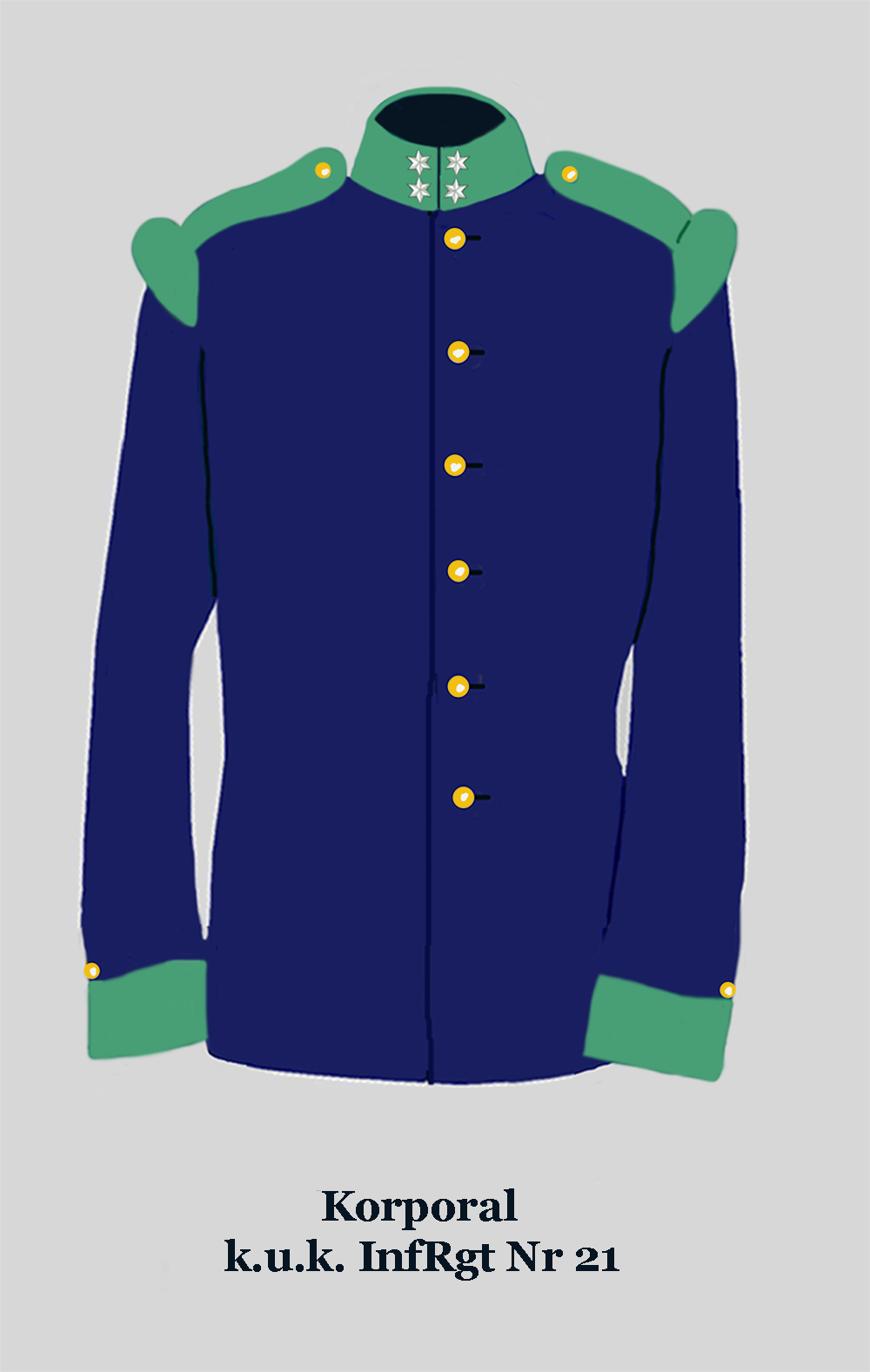
Inf.Rgt. Nr. 21

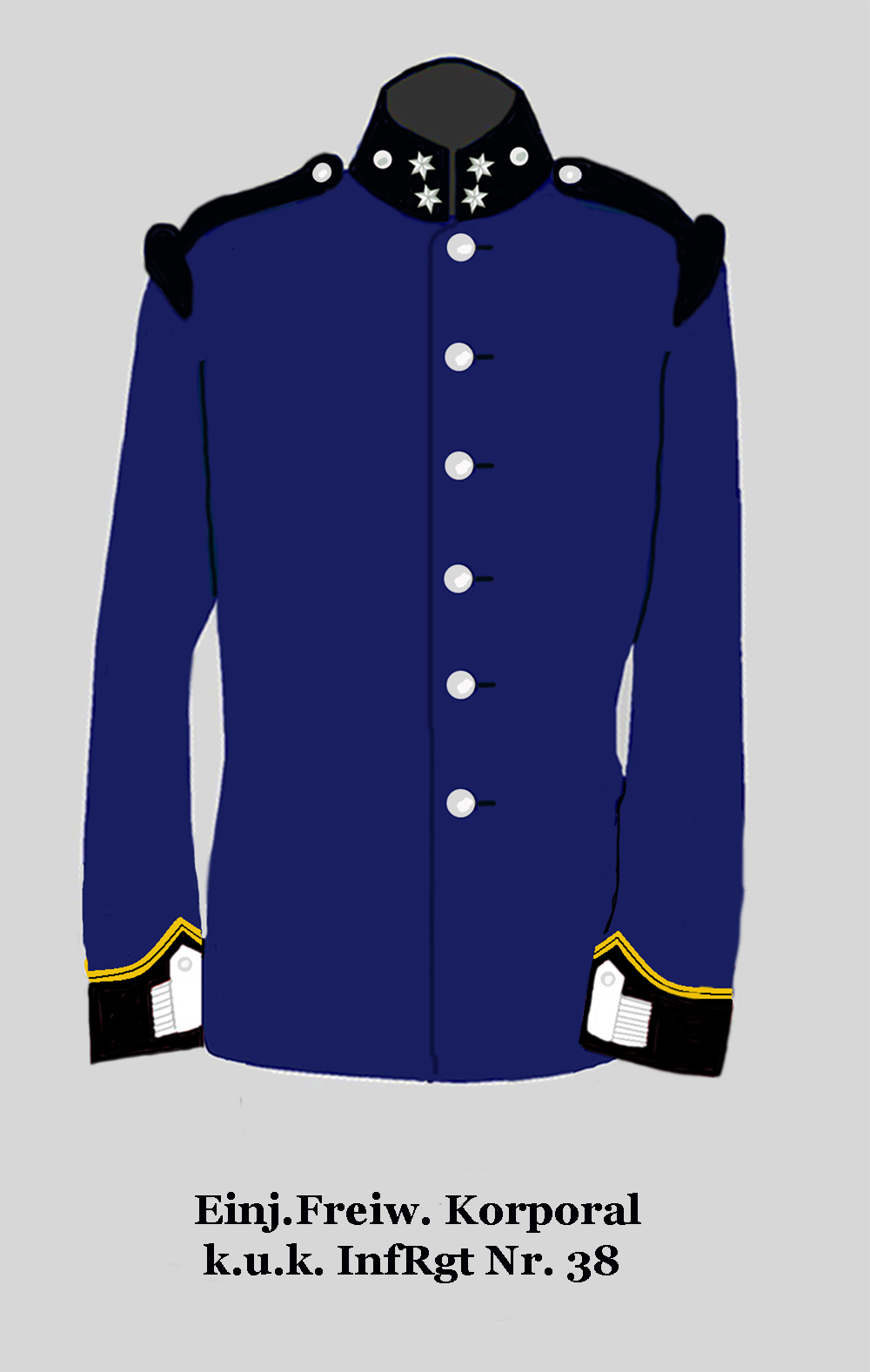
Inf.Rgt. Nr. 38

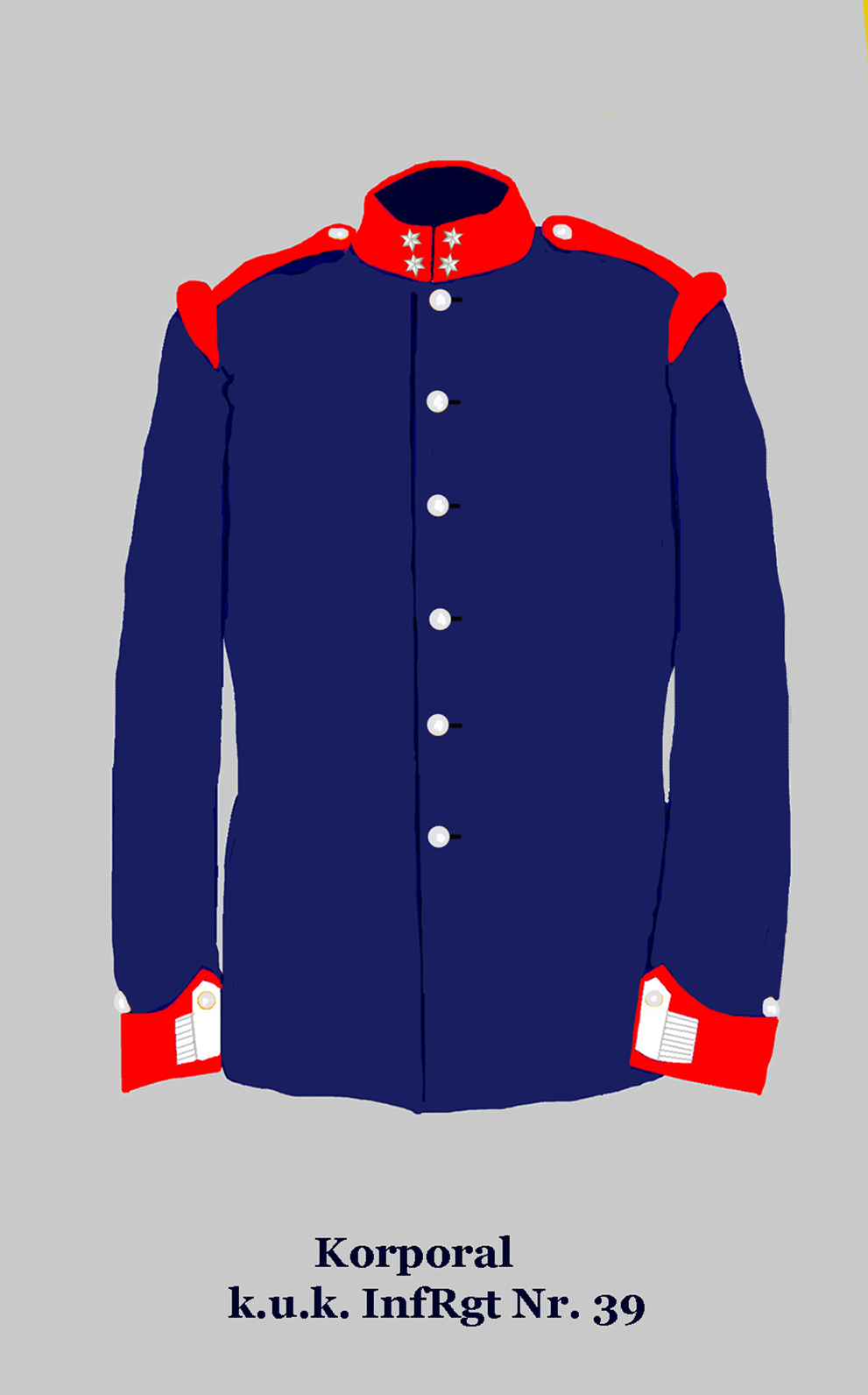
Inf.Rgt. Nr. 39

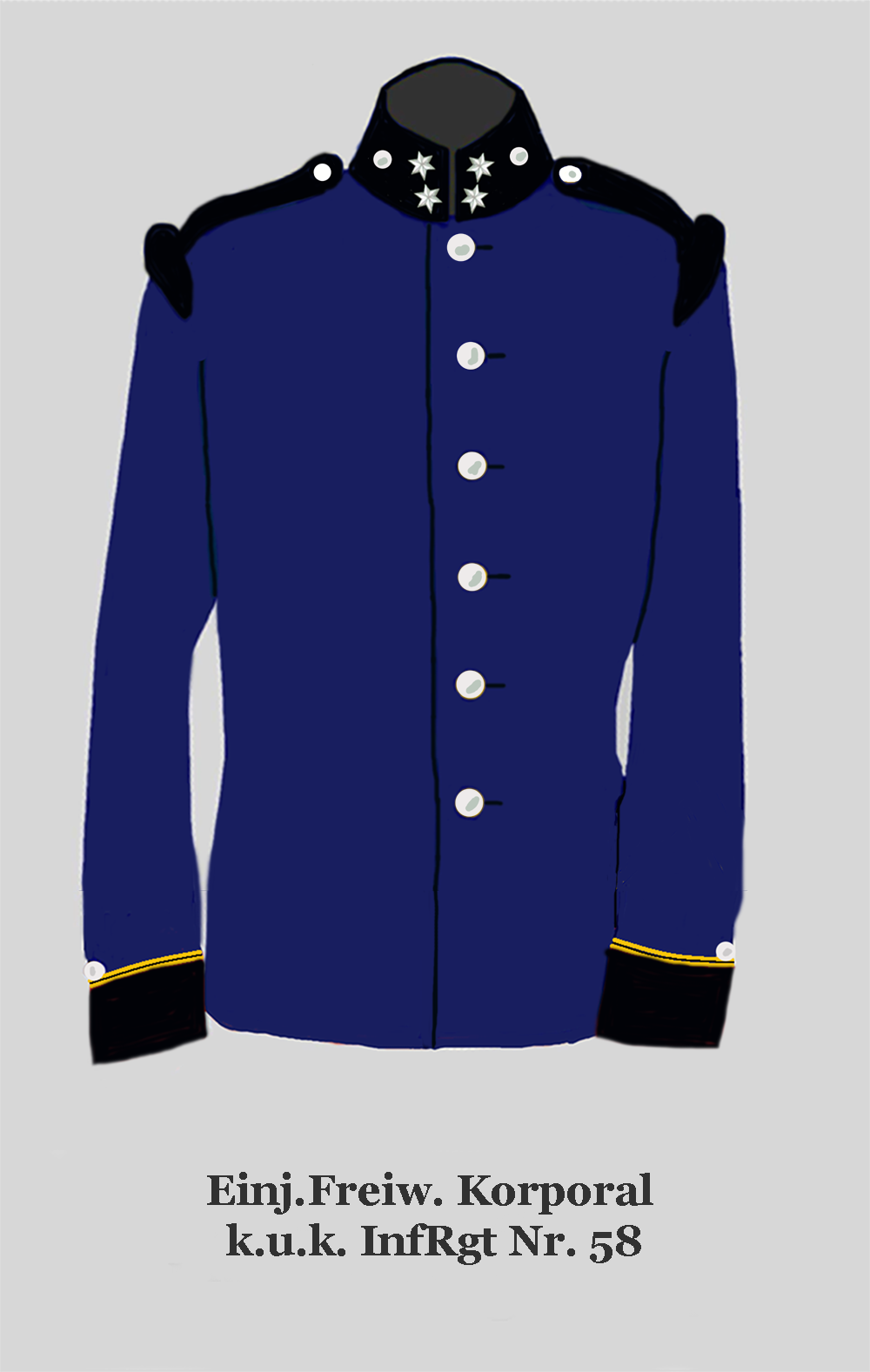
Inf.Rgt. Nr. 58

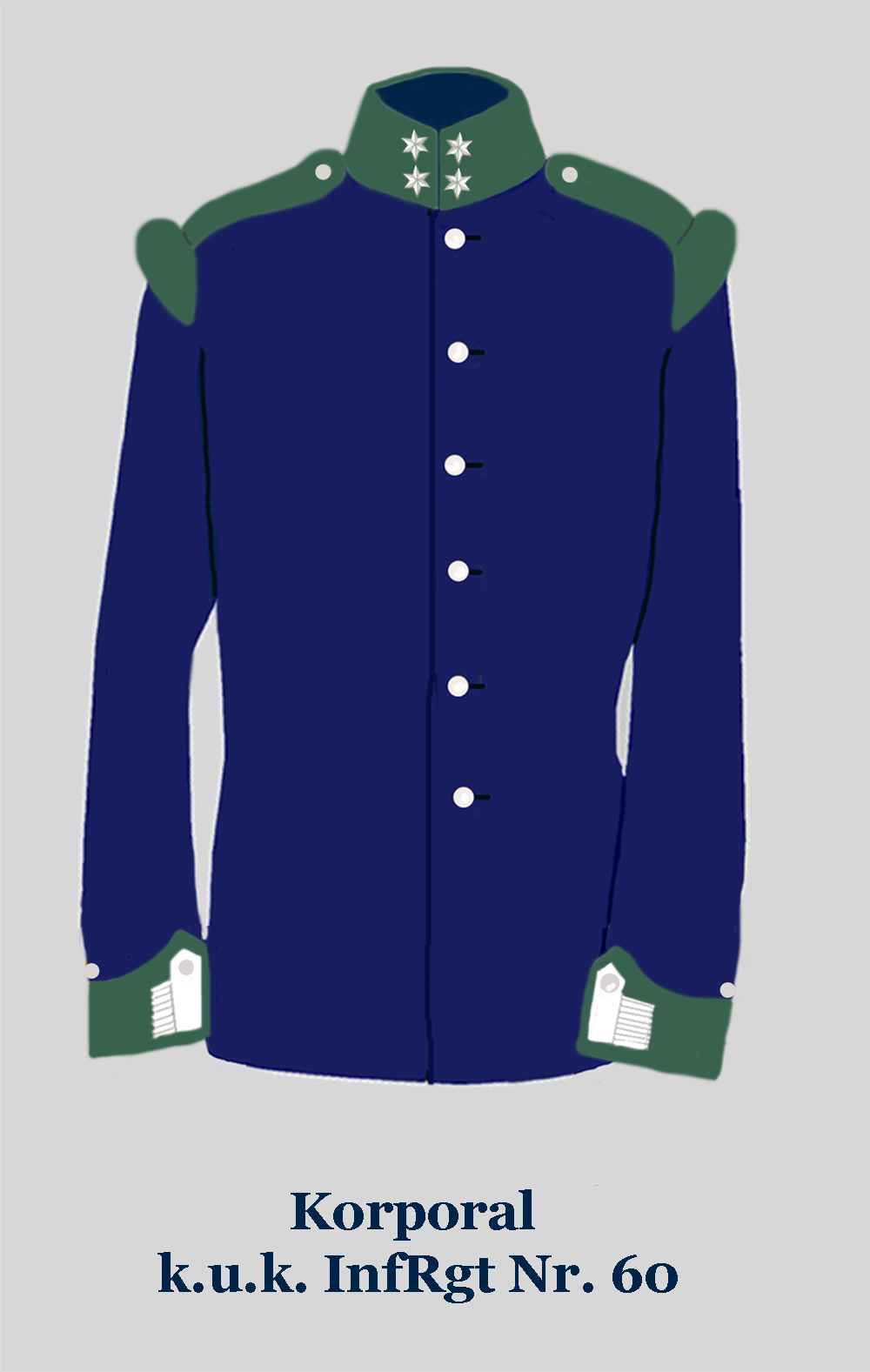
Inf.Rgt. Nr. 60

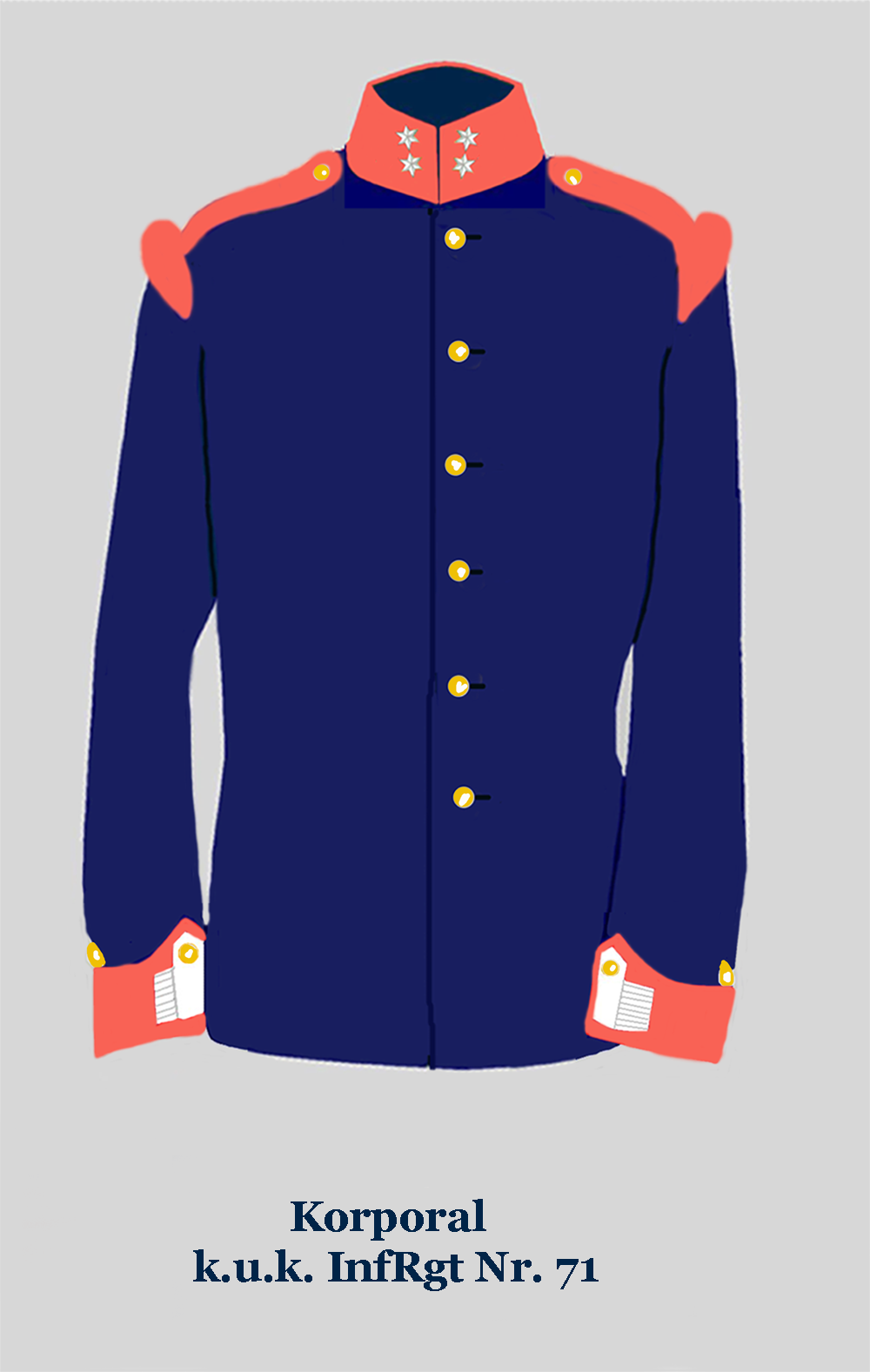
Inf.Rgt. Nr. 71

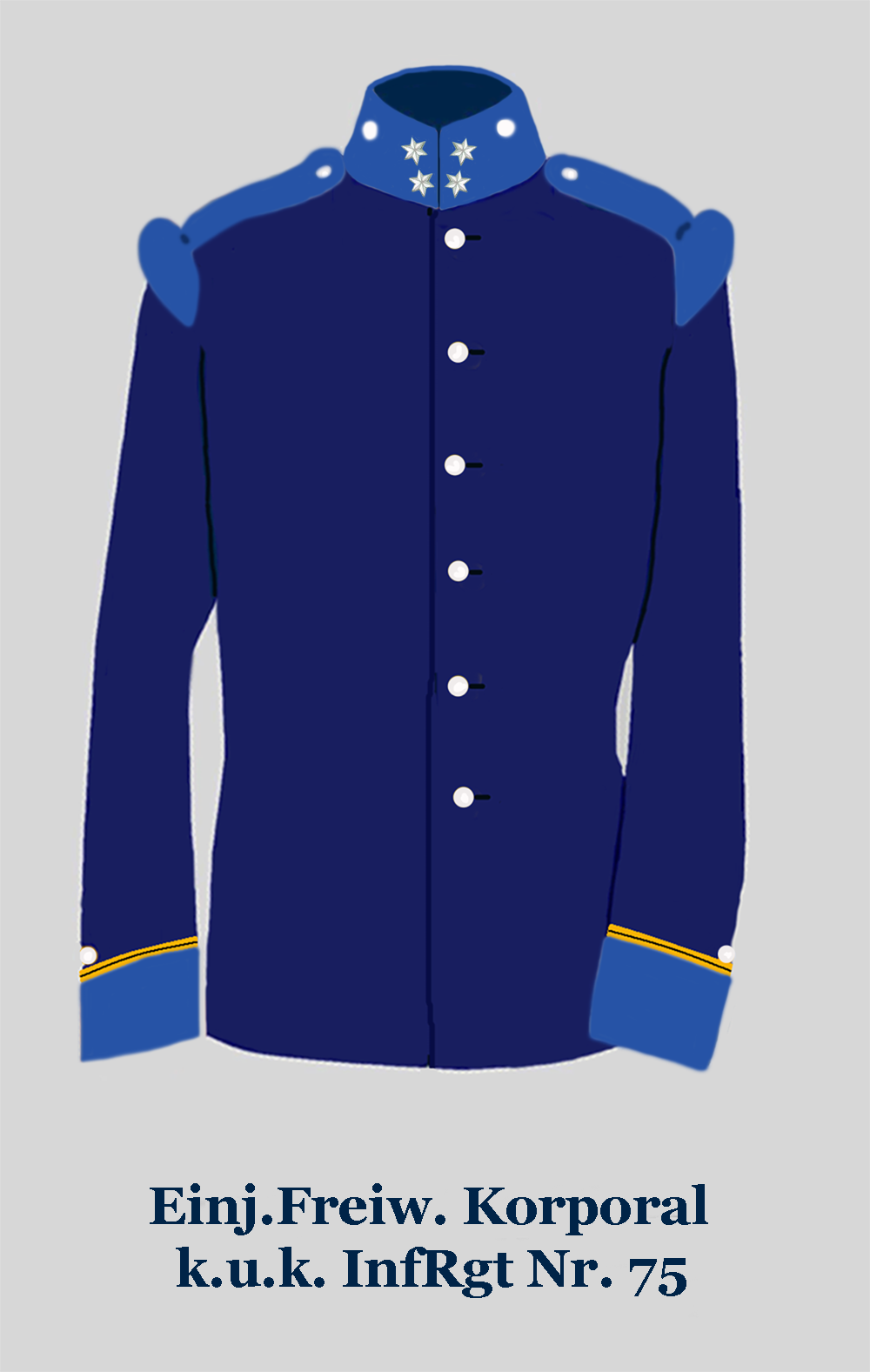
Inf.Rgt. Nr. 75

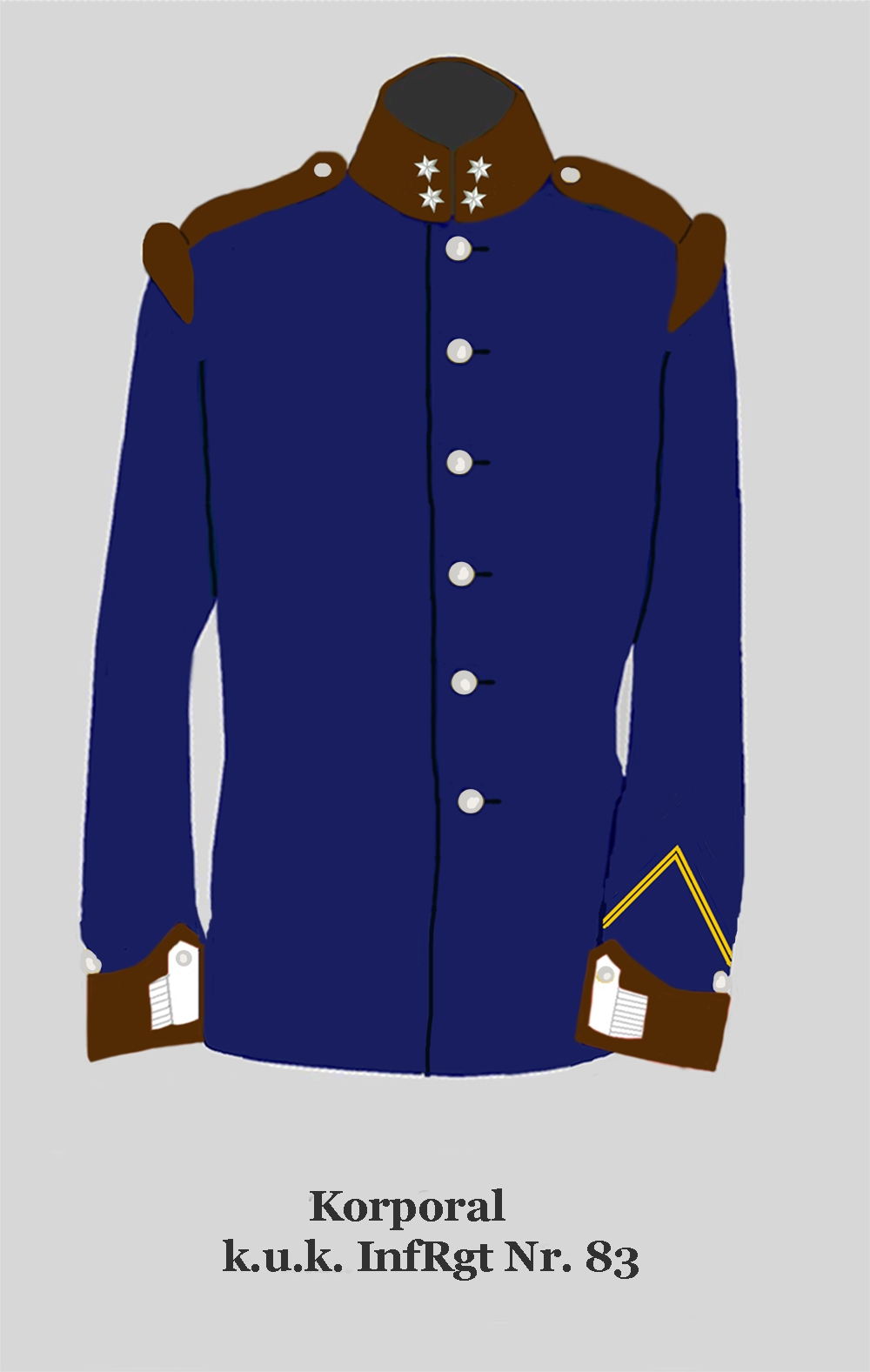
Inf.Rgt. Nr. 83

== Denmark ==
Corporal Korporal
- Army, Navy and Air force insignia
- Country: Denmark
- Service branch: Royal Danish Army; Royal Danish Navy; Royal Danish Air Force
- Rank group: Enlisted
- NATO rank code: OR-4
- Pay grade: M113
- Formation: 1609
- Next higher rank: Sergent
- Next lower rank: Overkonstabel af 1. grad; Marine-/Flyverspecialist

In 1609, Christian IV of Denmark created a permanent organization with regiments of the Royal Danish Army. A regiment would be assigned one ritmester, one løjtnant, one fænrik, and two korporals.

The first given insignia in 1812, when the rank was given two chevrons. It was originally the lowest NCO.

All promotions to korporal after 1 January 1984 were only temporary. On 1 October 2008, 23 Overkonstabel from the Army were the first to be permanently appointed korporals, while the rank simultaneously was changed to an enlisted rank.

On 9 March 2012, 12 naval and 12 aviation specialists, were appointed korporals. In the Navy, the degree is intended for employees who act as assistant instructors.

== Germany ==
Korporal
- Heer shoulder and Marine sleeve insignia
- Country: Germany
- Service branch: German Army; German Navy; German Air Force
- Abbreviation: Korp
- Rank group: Enlisted rank
- NATO rank code: OR-4
- Pay grade: A6
- Formation: 2021
- Next higher rank: Stabskorporal
- Next lower rank: Oberstabsgefreiter

Korporal (abbr. Korp) is the second highest enlisted rank in the Bundeswehr, that might be comparable to corporal in Anglophone armed forces. However, korporal belongs to the rank group of enlisted men, as distinguished from the corporal in Anglophone armed forces which is a non-commissioned officer.

=== History ===
The ranks Korporal and Stabskorporal were introduced by the Bundeswehr in October 2021 as the new most senior ranks for enlisted men, senior to Oberstabsgefreiter. This was done to allow soldiers who perform well and want to take more responsibility to reach a higher pay grade (A6 for Korporal, that is the same pay grade as the NCO rank Stabsunteroffizier (OR-5)) and thus make the career in the enlisted ranks more attractive.

Soldiers have to have served for at least three years in the rank of Oberstabsgefreiter before being considered for promotion.

In September 2021, the rank insignia for Korporal and Stabskorporal were introduced.

== Norway ==
In Norway, the rank is only used by the Norwegian Army. Here Korporal is split into 4 classes and is the "specialist officer" (Norwegian: spesialistbefalet) rank group.

NATO Code	OR-4		OR-3	OR-2
Norwegian Army
Norwegian Army	Korporal 1. klasse	Korporal	Visekorporal 1. klasse	Visekorporal
Literal translation	Corporal 1st class	Corporal	Vice corporal 1st class	Vice corporal
Official translation	Corporal 1st class	Corporal	Specialist 1st class	Specialist

== Switzerland ==
Korporal
- Country: Switzerland
- Service branch: Swiss Army; Swiss Air Force
- NATO rank code: OR-4
- Next higher rank: Wachtmeister
- Next lower rank: Obergefreiter

In the Military of Switzerland the Korporal is the lowest NCO-rank. The rank is higher than the enlisted rank Obergefreiter.

Until the so-called Army reform XXI (with effect from January 1, 2004) the regular Korporal appointment was to squad leader (de: Gruppenführer, 8-13 men). However, in 2014 this appointment was upgraded to Wachtmeister (OR-5). The Korporal rank was converted to military specialist without any command function.

Korporal is also a rank designation in the "Switzerland armed forces postal system", and in CBRN Defence.

In United Nations missions and in NATO Partnership for Peace the rank Korporal will be designated in English with Corporal (Cpl).

== Other armed forces ==
=== The Netherlands ===
In the Netherlands the promotion to "Korporaal" is possible after a longer service time in the enlisted men rank group. There are two corporal ranks:

- Korporaal OR-3
- Korporaal der 1e klasse OR-4

=== Vatican City ===
In the Pontifical Swiss Guard there are two corporal ranks:

- Korporal and
- Vizekorporal

=== Poland ===
In the Polish armed forces there are the two Korporal OR4-rank :

- Kapral [short: kpr.] (en: Corporal)
- Starszy kapral [short: st. kpr.]) (en: Senior corporal)

=== Prussia ===
In Prussia the "Corporal" commanded an up to 30 men strong so-called Korporalschaft. The rank sequence was as follows:

- Gefreiter
- Korporal
- Sergant and/or Feldwebel

In 1856 the designation korporal was changed to Unteroffizier. Until 1807 the (aristocrat) officer aspirants were called Freikorporal (transl. Free corporal).

== Examples ==
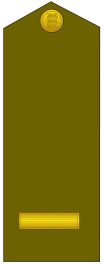
Estonia
Kapral, OR-2

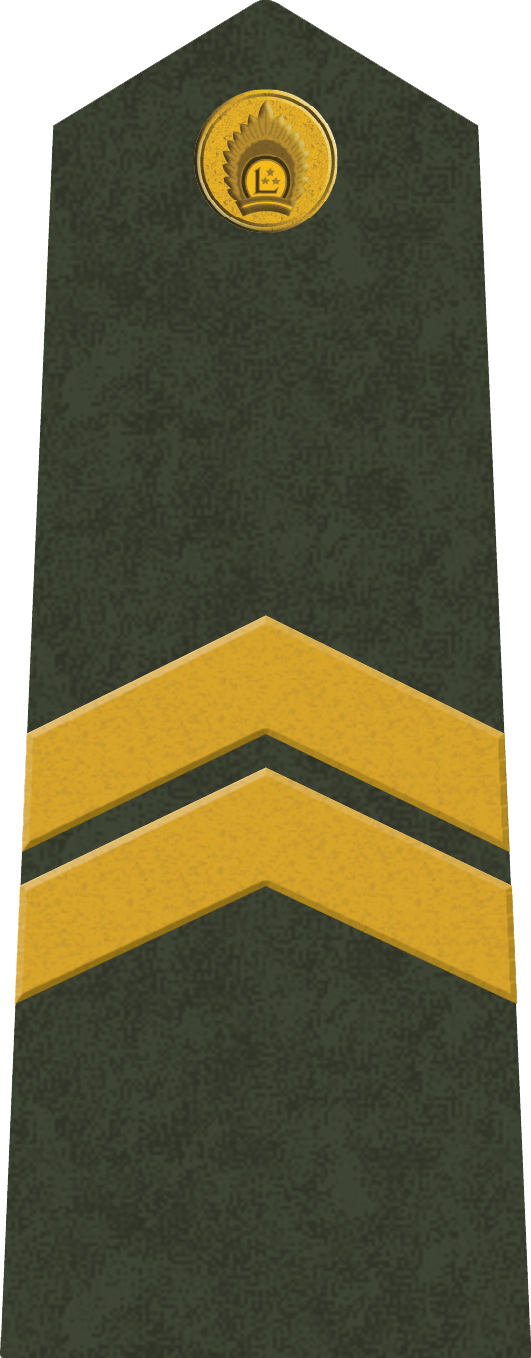
Latvia
Kaprālis, OR-4, Army

Netherlands
Korporaal, OR-3, Army

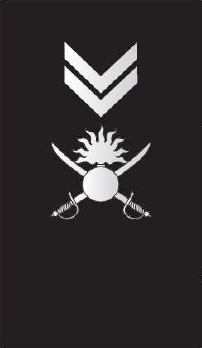
Norway
Korporal, OR-4

Poland
Kapral Army special forces
