= Paroli (uniform) =

Uniform element in the Austro-Hungarian Army

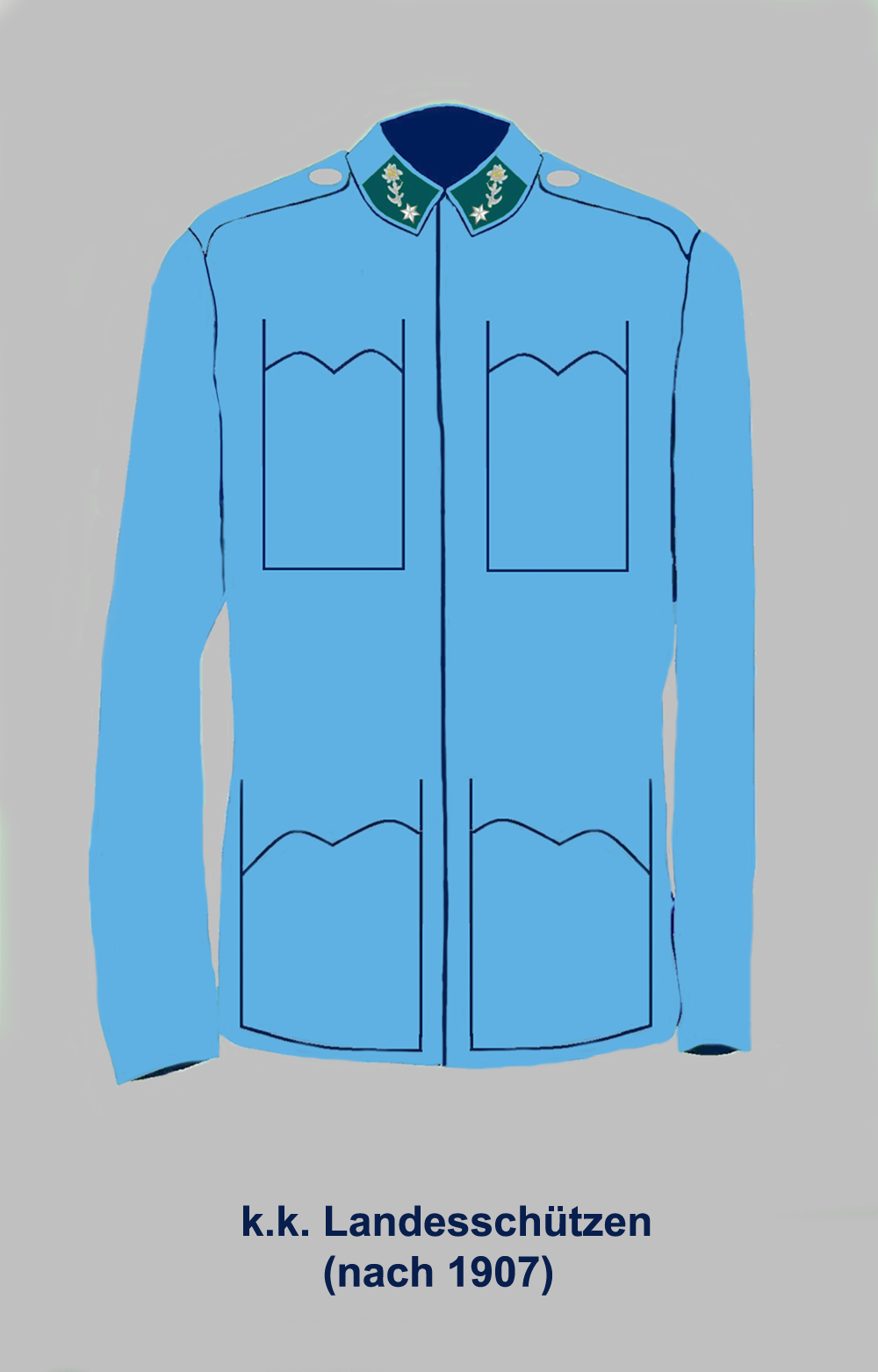
Broad Parolis on battle-dress blouse before 1916

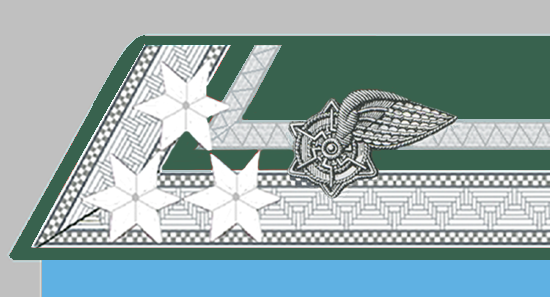
Broad Paroli with silke stars and special badge after 1913

The Paroli (pl. Parolis; en: gorget patch, collar tab, or patch) was initially the designation for the coloured gorget patches of the Austro-Hungarian Army. It is applied on the gorget of a uniform coat or jacket and the battle-dress blouse. The Parolis indicated the egalisation colour and served as discrimination criteria of the 102 infantry regiments of the Austro-Hungarian Army, as well as dragoon regiment (mounted infantry) and the regiment of the uhlans (light cavalry). In other German-speaking armed forces, the designation was called Kragenpatte, Kragenspiegel, or Arabesque.

== Paroli in the Austro-Hungarian Army ==
In the Austro-Hungarian Army, two Parolis (on the left and right side) were applied to the front part of the uniform gorget on the coat, Waffenrock (en: service uniform, dress uniform and/or battle-dress blouse), as indicated below. Rank stars and special badges could be attached as appropriate and indicated below.

- On uniform coat – a curved tongue with the upward-directed point, the lower end of the point broadens with a bottom in the center.
- On battle-dress blouse with stand-up collar – broad Parolis were covering approximately 1/5th of the gorget length. Rank stars, color stripes of cloth, piping, and special badges were attached to the front area.
- After 1916, broad Parolis were replaced by smaller ones, with vertical color stripes of cloth on the end.

The rank stars of the rank groups gemeine, charges, and Unteroffiziere (NCOs) were made from white celluloid. However, since the year 1913 Paroli rank stars to Stabsfeldwebel and Kadett were made from white silk. Offiziersstellvertreter (officer deputy) rank stars were made from brass, and the rank stars designated for Fähnrich and officers were metallic gold-plated or silver-plated. In cases of self-procurement, metal embroidered rank stars were allowed.

=== Examples ===
The galleries below show examples of Parolis:

- on the pike-grey battle-dress blouse or coat, as per order of 1908 or 1916
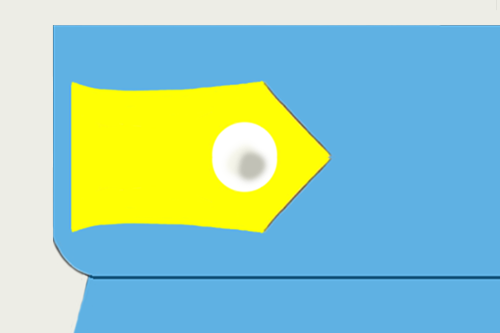
Paroli on coat with curved tongue in sulphur-yellow

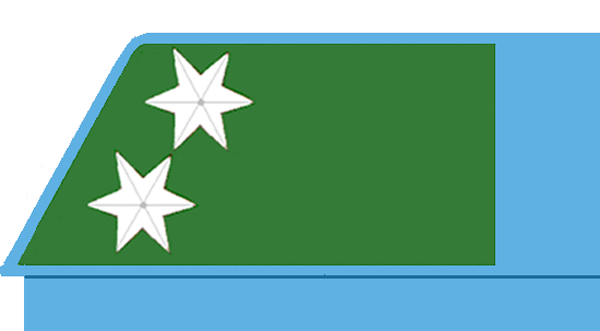
Paroli broad version in apple-green, with celluloid stars, 1908

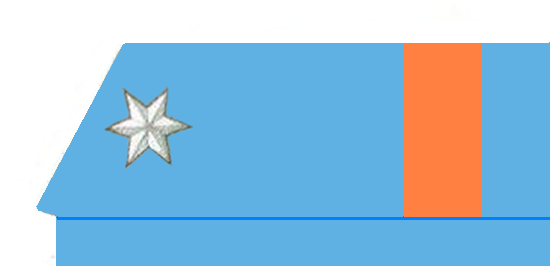
Paroli small version with orange-yellow stripe of cloth, 1916

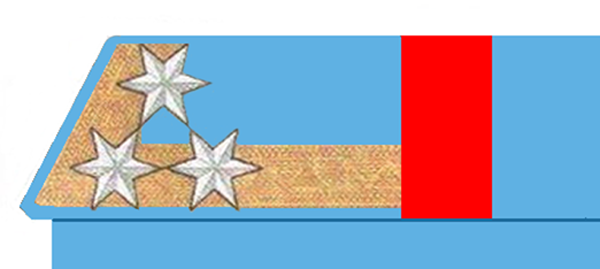
Feldwebel, Paroli in scarlet-red, 1916

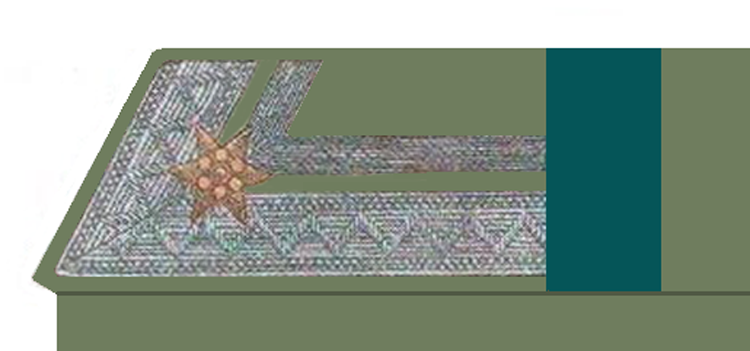
Offiziersstellvertreter, Paroli in grass-green, with brass star, 1916

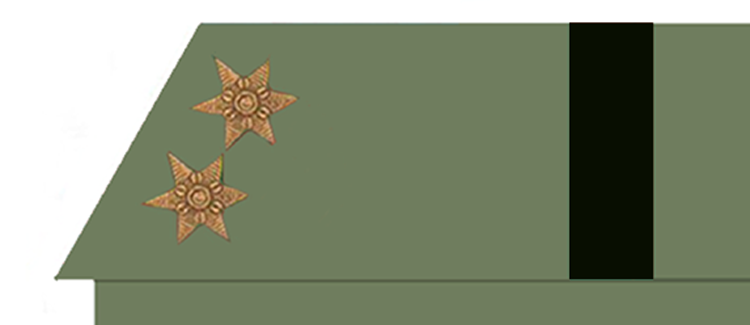
Oberleutnant, Paroli in black, with gold-plated stars, 1916

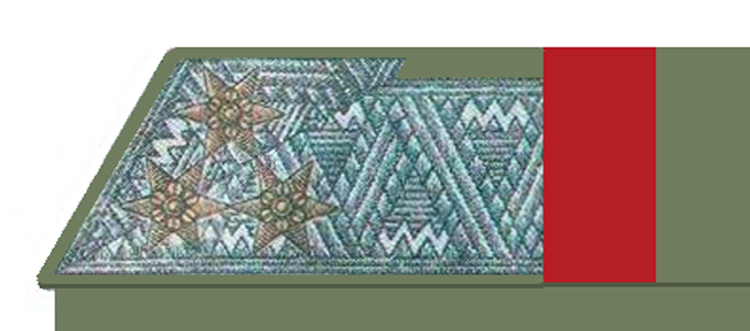
Oberst, Paroli in dark-red, 1916

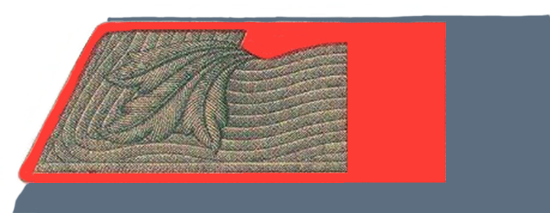
Feldmarschall, Paroli in crab-red, 1916
- Special Parolis on the pike-grey battle-dress blouse, as per the order of 1916
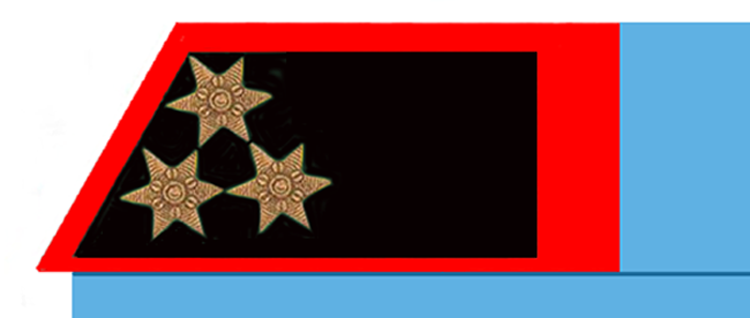
Hauptmann in the General staff (Hauptmann im Generalstabes)

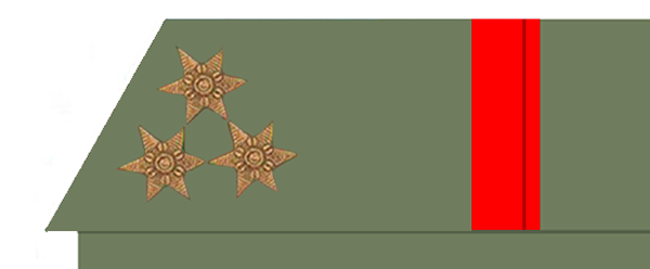
Hauptmann in the Artillery staff (... im Artilleriestab, with egalisation colour on smaller stripe of cloth and piping)

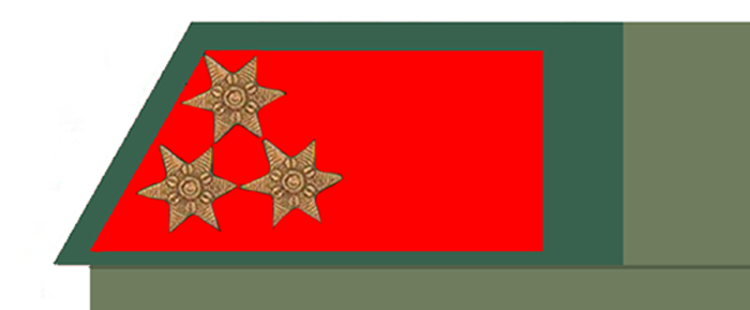
Hauptmann in the Engineer staff (... im Geniestab)

== Paroli in Austria today ==
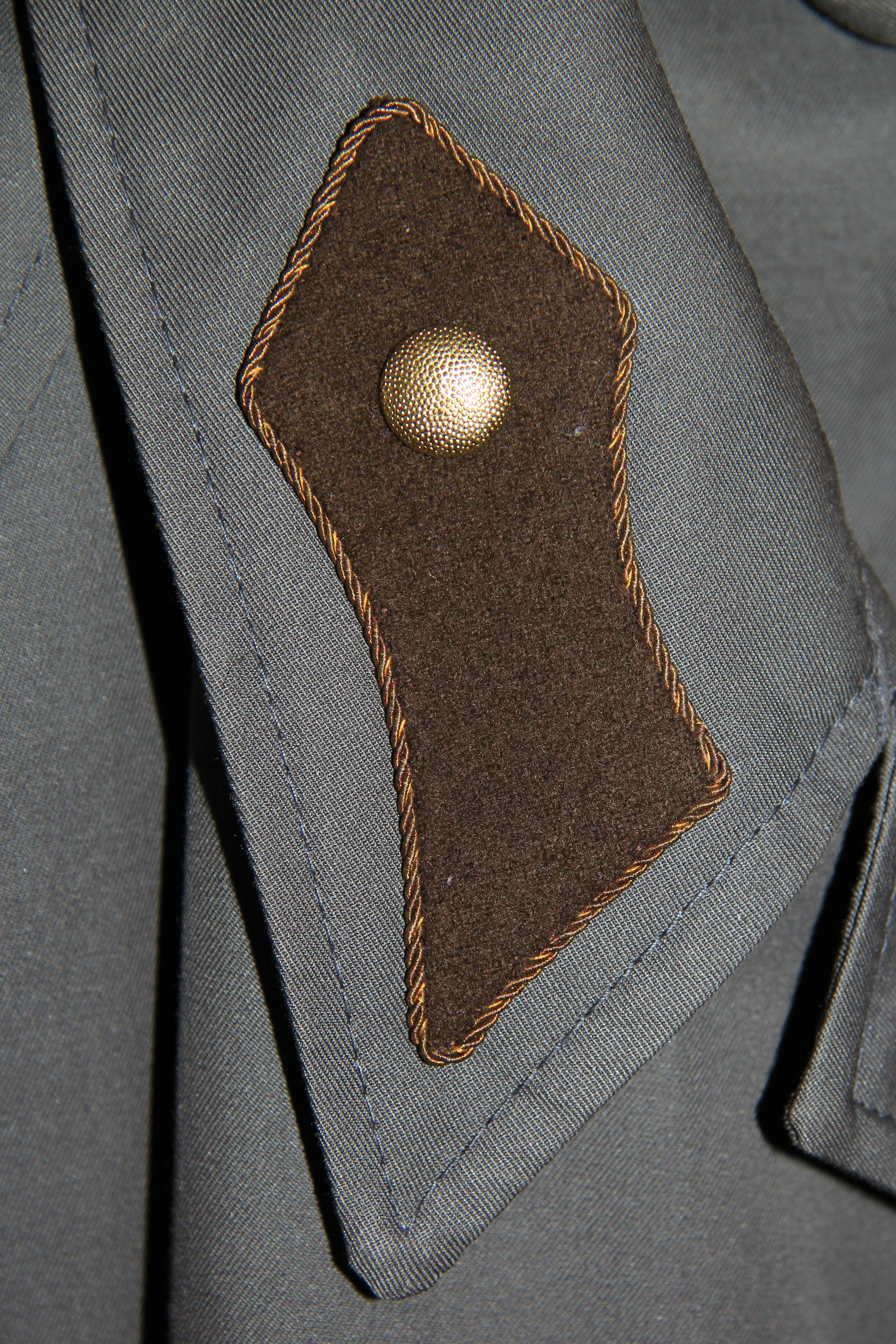
Paroli on coat of an Austrian fire fighter

The system of rank insignia on military uniforms remains almost unchanged since the Austro-Hungarian Empire was established. Slight changes in wording has occurred, such as changing "paroli with distinction star" to "distinction insignia". However, today only the curved tongue on the coat with the upwards directed point is designated as Paroli.

The gallery below shows some examples of the today's Austrian Bundesheer.

Bundesheer
Rank		Zugsführer	Korporal	Gefreiter
Insignia	Shoulder board			
Insignia	Suit 75/3			
Insignia	Jacket gorget			
Corps colour		Engineers	Skirmishing patrol	NBC-Defence

== Paroli in Hungary today ==
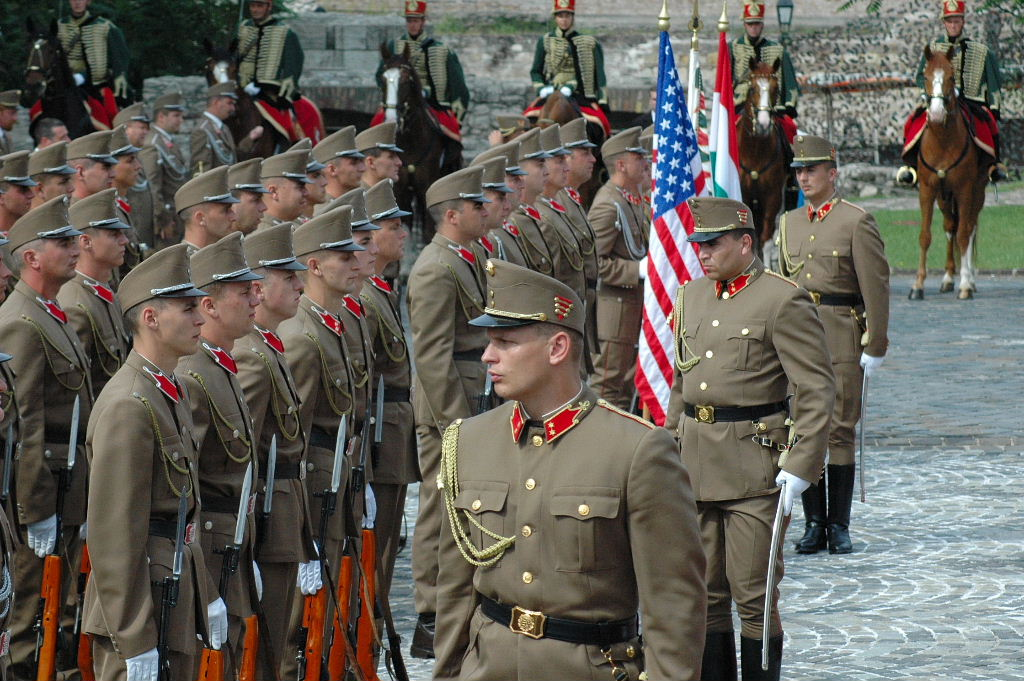
Paroli on a jacket of a Hungarian Officer

The system of rank insignia on military uniforms remains almost unchanged since the Austro-Hungarian Empire was established except the Soviet occupation. In 1990 when Hungary became a sovereign country again, the HDF took on heritage rank insignia of the Royal Hungarian Army with slight changes. Today these gorget patches are still called Paroli.

The gallery below shows an example of the today's Hungarian Defence Forces.

Hungarian Defence Forces
Rank		Chief Warrant Officer
Insignia	Jacket gorget	

=== Branch colours ===
Colour	Branch
Carmine	Logistics
Scarlet	Artillery, Air defence and General Officers
Cornflower blue	Signals and Electronics
Black	Armoured and Chaplains
Steel green	Technical, Chemical protection and Financial
Light blue	Air Force and Train Troops
Rifle green	Infantry
White	Reconnaissance and Special Forces
Dark blue	River Flotilla

== Sources ==
- Adjustierungsvorschrift für die k. u. k. gemeinsame Armee, die k.k. Landwehr, die k.u. Landwehr, die verbundenen Einrichtungen und das Corps der Militär-Beamten. (Theil III) Herausgegeben mit Genehmigung des k.u.k. Kriegsministeriums durch die k.u.k. Hofdruckerei von Erich Christl, Bozen 1912.
- Johann C. Allmayer-Beck, Erich Lessing: Die K.u.k. Armee. 1848–1918. Verlag Bertelsmann, München 1974, ISBN 3-570-07287-8.
- Stefan Rest: Des Kaisers Rock im ersten Weltkrieg. Verlag Militaria, Wien 2002, ISBN 3-9501642-0-0
- Das k.u.k. Heer im Jahre 1895 Schriften des Heeresgeschichtlichen Museums in Wien - Leopold Stocker Verlag, Graz 1997
