= Oberwachtmeister =

Military rank

Oberwachtmeister (OWm) (ge: for senior master-sentinel; senior watch-master) is in Austria and Switzerland a military rank of non-commissioned officers (NCO). The Dutch variant (opperwachtmeester) used in cavalry, artillery and marechaussee branches of the Dutch armed forces. Besides Austria and Switzerland today, the rank was also used for example in Germany and Russia.

== Austria ==
Oberwachtmeister
- Peaked cap

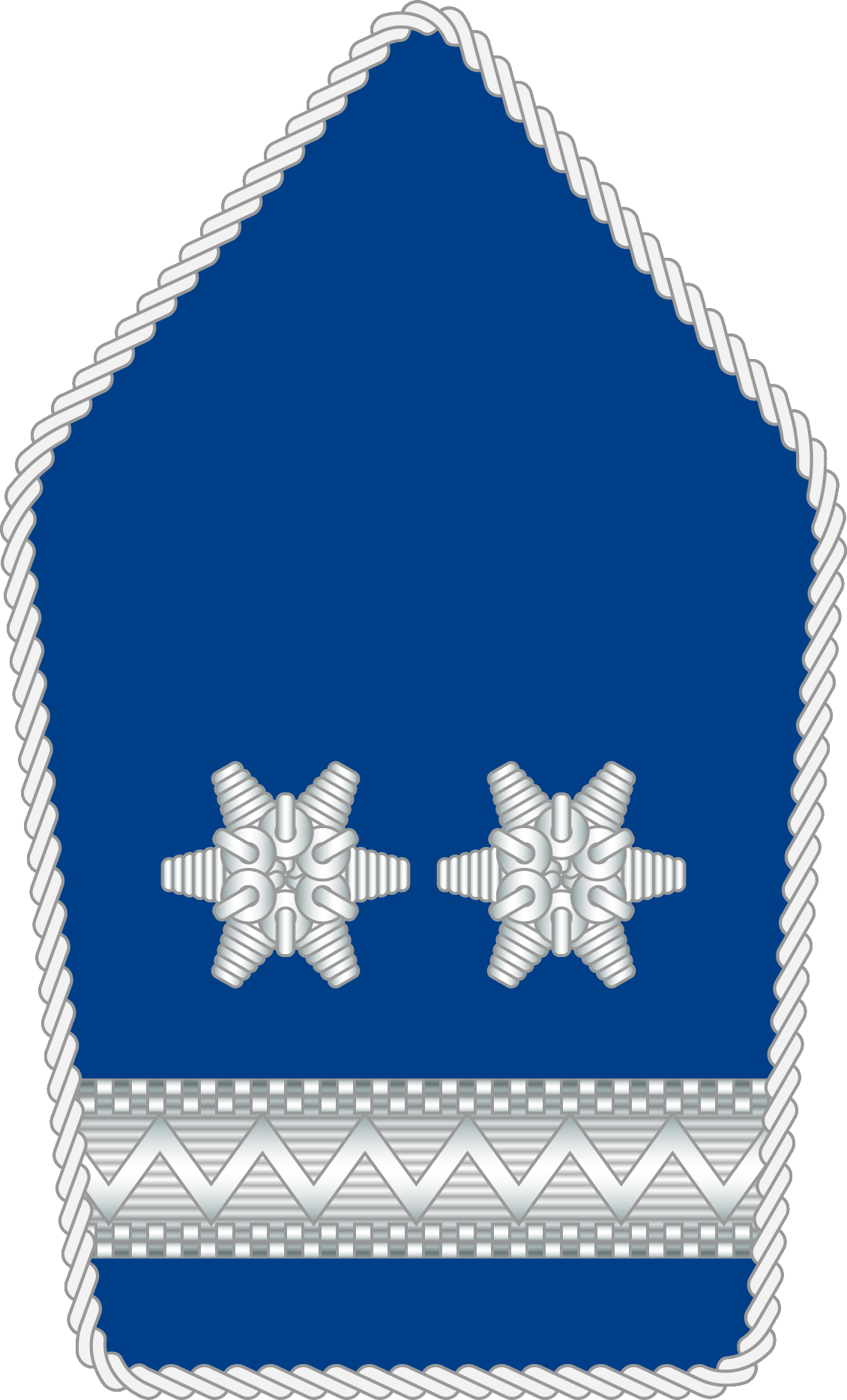
- Field uniform | service uniform
- Country: Austria
- Service branch: Austrian Armed Forces
- Abbreviation: OWm
- Rank group: Junior NCO (Unteroffiziere)
- Non-NATO rank: OR-6
- Formation: 1965
- Next higher rank: Stabswachtmeister
- Next lower rank: Wachtmeister

Oberwachtmeister is in the Austrian Bundesheer the second lowest NCO-rank (assignment group M BUO 2 / professional NCO; respectively M ZUO 2 / longer-serving volunteer). The Oberwachtmeister will be normally deployed as leader (Austrian: Kommandant) of a squad (8 to 13 soldiers).

During United Nations missions and in NATO Partnership for Peace the rank Oberwachtmeister will be designated in English with Master sergeant.

== Germany ==
In the German army ground forces the designation of the OR6-Oberfeldwebel rank of Cavalry and Artillery was the «Oberwachtmeister» until 1945.

Junior Rank; Wachtmeister (Feldwebel)	World War II German Army rank Oberwachtmeister (Oberfeldwebel)	Senior Rank; Stabswachtmeister (Stabsfeldwebel)

See also

- World War II German Army ranks and insignia

=== Nationale People’s Army ===
In the GDR National People's Army (NPA) the OR6-rank «Oberwachtmeister» was replaced by the universal rank designation Oberfeldwebel. The equivalent rank of the Volksmarine (en: GDR Navy) was the Obermeister of the Volksmarine.

Junior Rank; Wachtmeister (Feldwebel)	National People's Army rank Oberwachtmeister (Oberfeldwebel)	Senior Rank; Stabswachtmeister (Stabsfeldwebel)

See also

- Ranks of the National People's Army

«Oberwachtmeister» was also a German police and justice rank.

== Netherlands ==
In the cavalry, artillery and marechaussee branches of the Dutch military forces, the rank of sergeant major is referred to as opperwachtmeester. In the same branches sergeants are referred to as wachtmeester.

== Switzerland ==
Oberwachtmeister
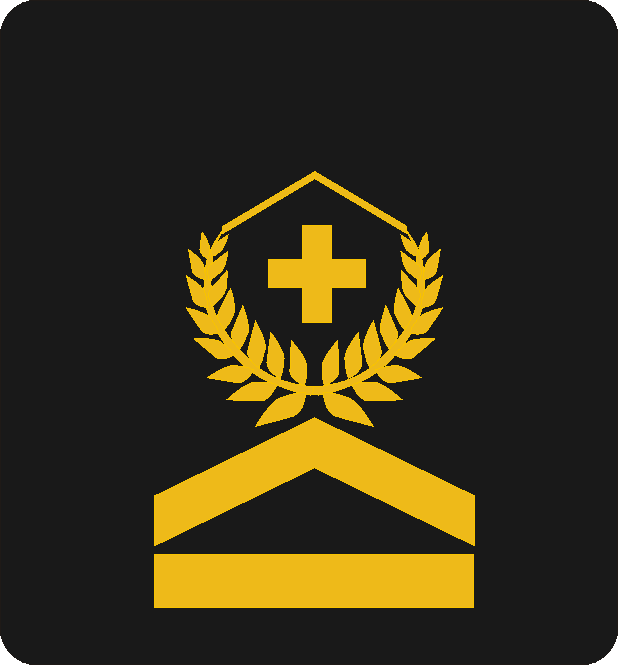
- Swiss insignia
- Country: Switzerland
- Service branch: Swiss Armed Forces
- Abbreviation: Obwm
- Rank group: Non-commissioned officer
- Next higher rank: Feldweibel
- Next lower rank: Wachtmeister

In the Military of Switzerland the Oberwachtmeister (Obwm, Sergent-chef, Sergente capo) is a NCO-rank. The rank is higher than the rank Wachtmeister, and lower than Feldweibel.

Until the so-called Army reform XXI (with effect from January 1, 2004) the rank was regular assigned to the Zugführer-Stellvertreter (en: deputy platoon leader).

However, the promotion to Oberwachtmeister might be possible after successfully having finished an additional trainings course. The level of that course succeeds the squad leader level. The Oberwachtmeister grade is in principle a transition rank to the lieutenant promotion.

In United Nations missions and in NATO Partnership for Peace the rank Oberwachtmeister will be designated in English with Sergeant First Class (SFC).
