= Zugsführer =

Austrian military rank

- Peaked cap

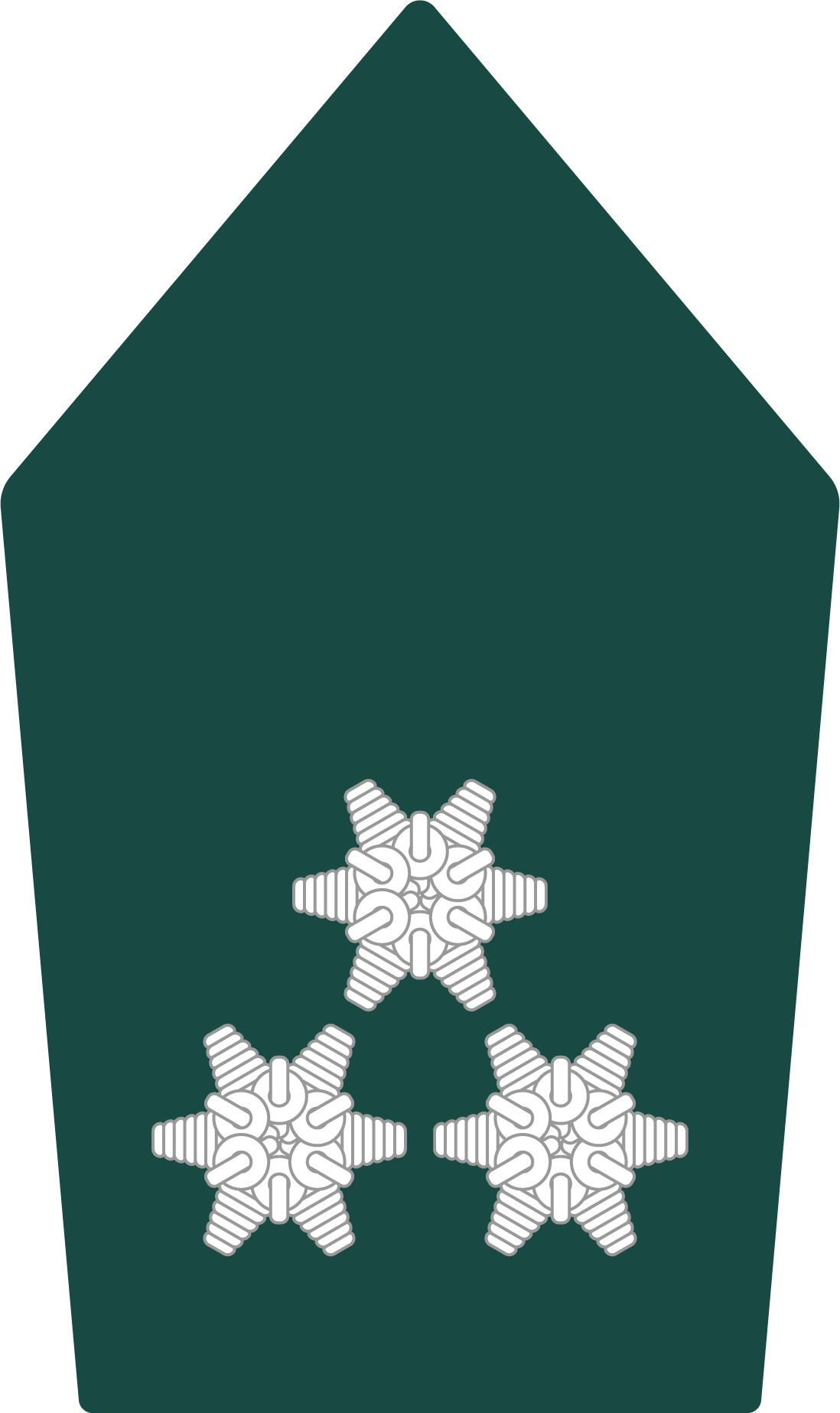
- Field uniform | service uniform
- Country: Austria
- Service branch: Austrian Armed Forces
- Abbreviation: Zgf
- Rank group: Enlisted rank
- Non-NATO rank: OR-4
- Formation: 1857
- Next higher rank: Wachtmeister
- Next lower rank: Korporal

Zugsführer (Zgf or ZF; lit. 'Platoon leader') is a rank of the enlisted men rank group (EN group) in the Austrian Bundesheer. In comparison to the German Bundeswehr it is equivalent to the EN-rank “Oberstabsgefreiter”. A Zugsführer might be tasked to lead a sub-subunit of 8 to 13 soldiers.

== Austria-Hungary (until 1918) ==
The Zugsführer rank was derived from the former platoon corporal (de: Zugskorporal) in 1857 and introduced to the Austro-Hungarian armed forces (hu: „Szakaszvezető“). The rank was equivalent to the German NCO-grade Sergeant. The Zugsführer was authorized to wear yellow-black NCO port epée.

Depending on the armed forces branch, service, or assignment the Zugsführer rank (with the appropriate rank I insignia) was equivalent to:

- Stabführer (en: Tambour major)
- Kurschmied (en: Health smith, cavalry shoeing)
- Rechnungs-Unteroffizier 2. Klasse (en: Fiscal NCO 2nd class; hu: Számvivö altiszt)
- Waffenmeister 2. Klasse (en: Weapon master 2nd class)

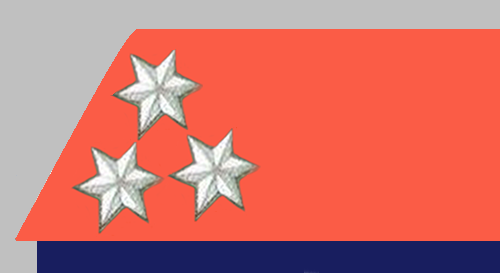
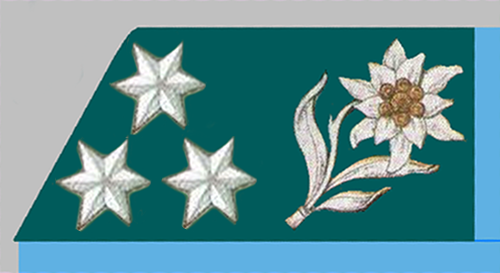
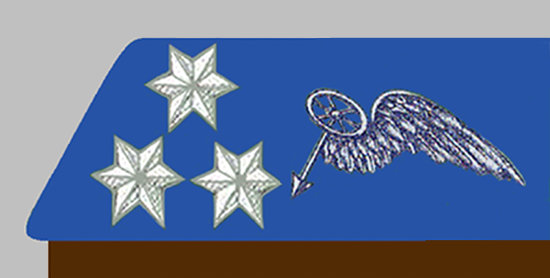
Designation	Sergeants / Zugsführer ranks
Paroli
Rank description	Zugsführer			Kurschmied	Rechnungs- Unteroffizier; 2. Klasse	Waffenmeister; 2. Klasse
Branch	Infantry	Mountain infantry	Motor transport regiment	Cavalry	Fiscal matters	Artillery
(English)	(Zugsführer)			(Farrier)	(Viscal NCO; 2nd class)	(Weapon master 2nd class)

== See also ==
- Ranks of the Austrian Bundesheer
- Rank insignias of the Austro-Hungarian armed forces
- Zugführer
