= Gemeiner =

Common designation of soldiers in several armies

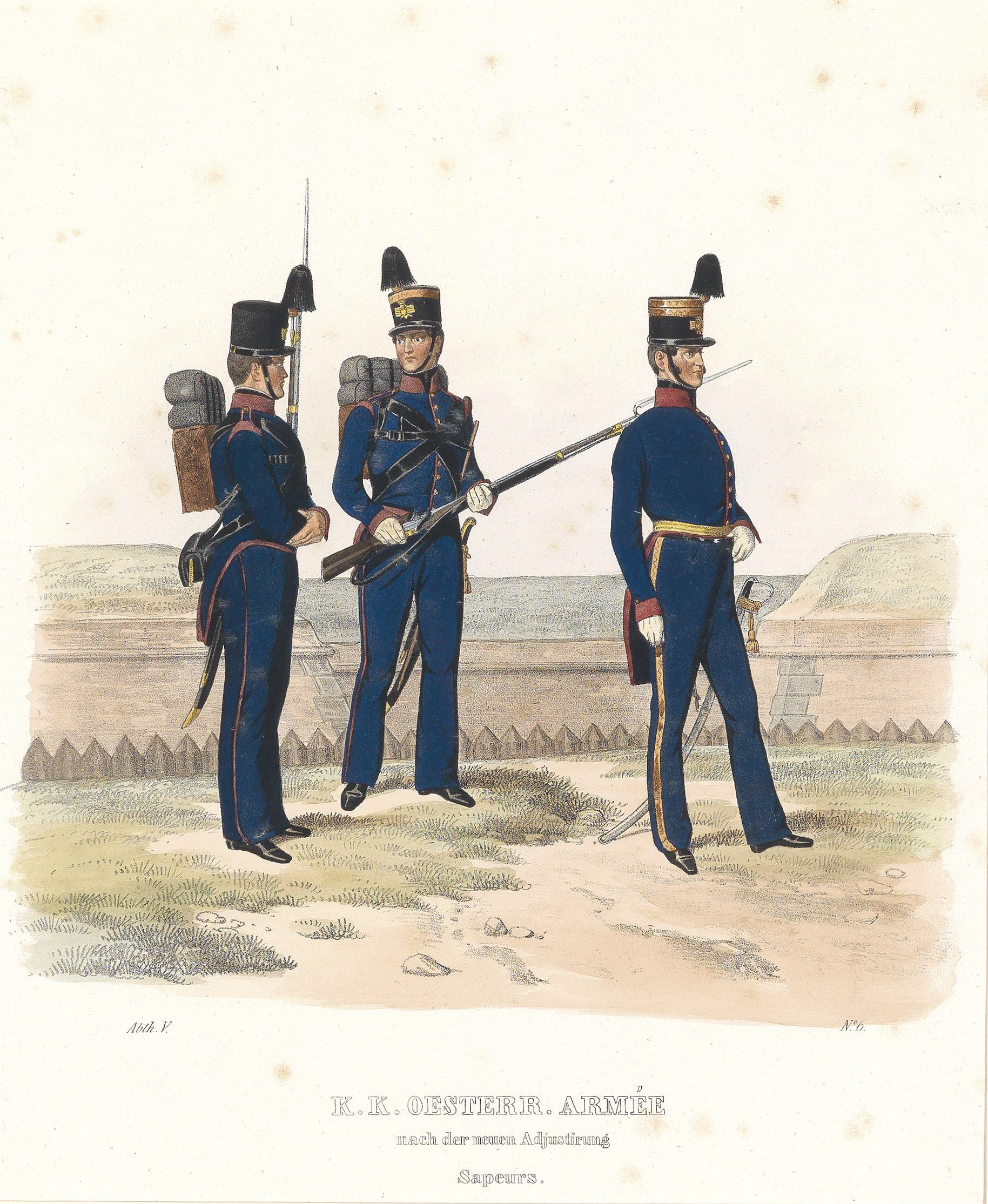
Gemeiner, Korporal and Feldwebel (l.t.r., k.k. Army 1837)

Gemeiner (pl. Gemeine, en: private or soldier) was until 1918 the common designation to soldier(s) in the Austro-Hungarian Army (k.u.k. Army) and German Army. In line to the particular branch of service it contained the rank file as follows:

- Dragoner (en: dragoon),
- Grenadier,
- Husar (hussar),
- Infanterist (infantryman)
- Jäger (rifleman),
- Füsilier (fusilier or fusileer),
- Kanonier (gunner, cannoneer),
- Musketier (musketeer), etc.
- Pionier (engineer)
- Sanitätssoldat (medicalman)
- Trainsoldat (trainman)
- Ulan (uhlan)

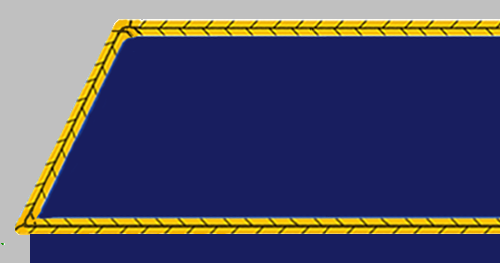
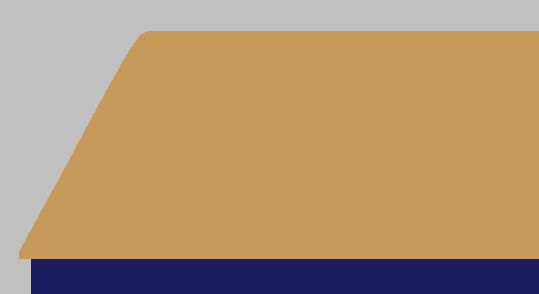
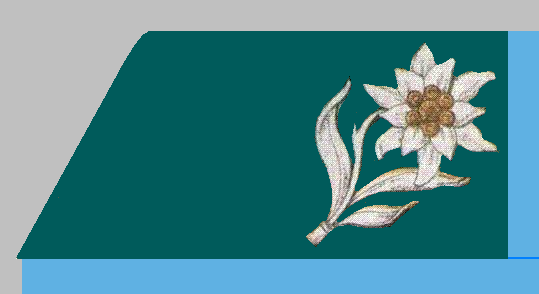
Designation	Austria-Hungary
Rank insignia
Rank description	Husar	Infantrist	Jäger
Branch	Cavalry	Infantry	Mountain infantry
(English)	(Hussar only)	(Infantryman)	(Rifleman)

Gallery, "k.u.k. Inf.Rgt. Hoch- und Deutschmeister Nr. 4" (l.t.r)

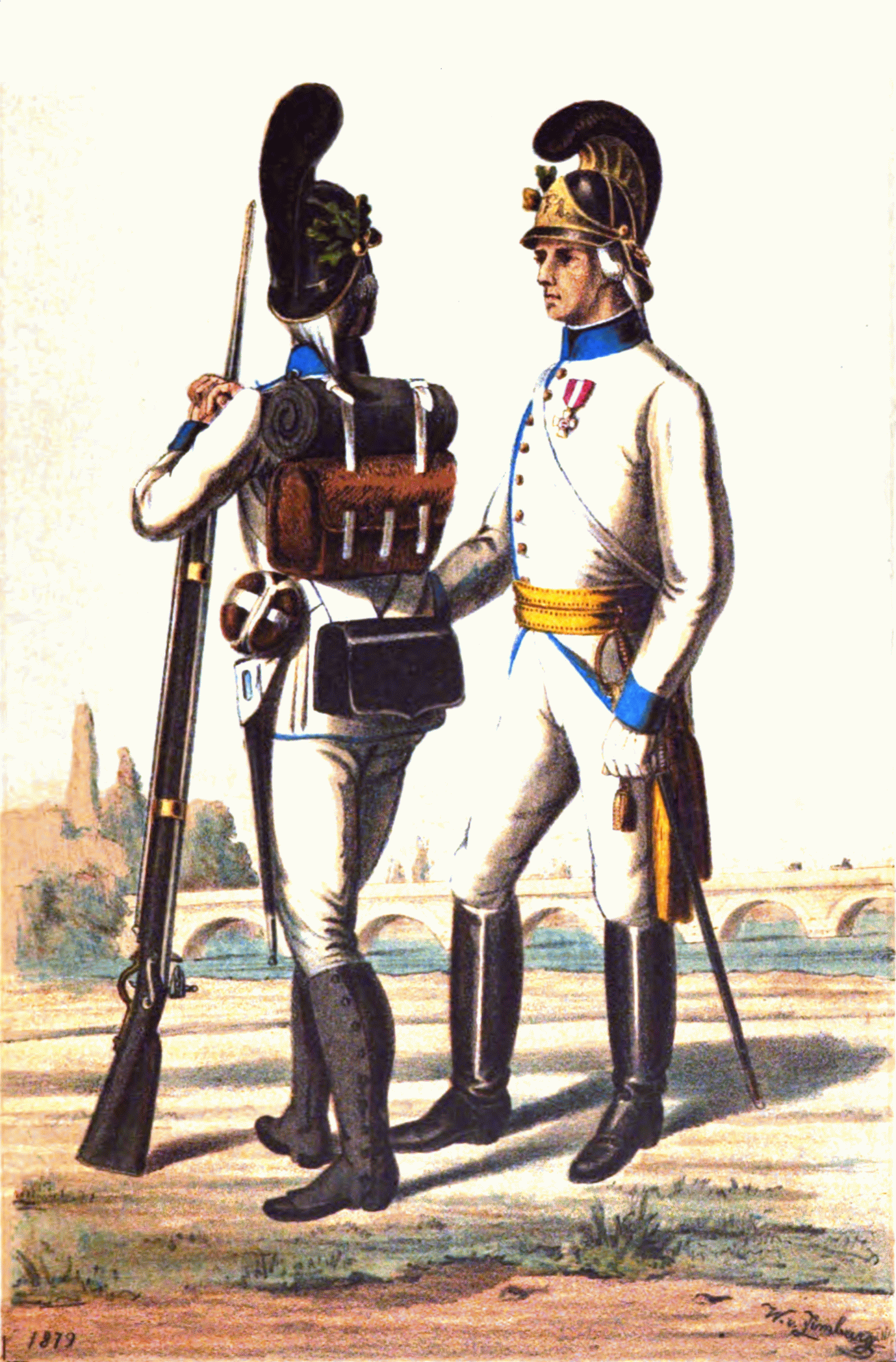
Gemeiner and officer
(1798-1809)

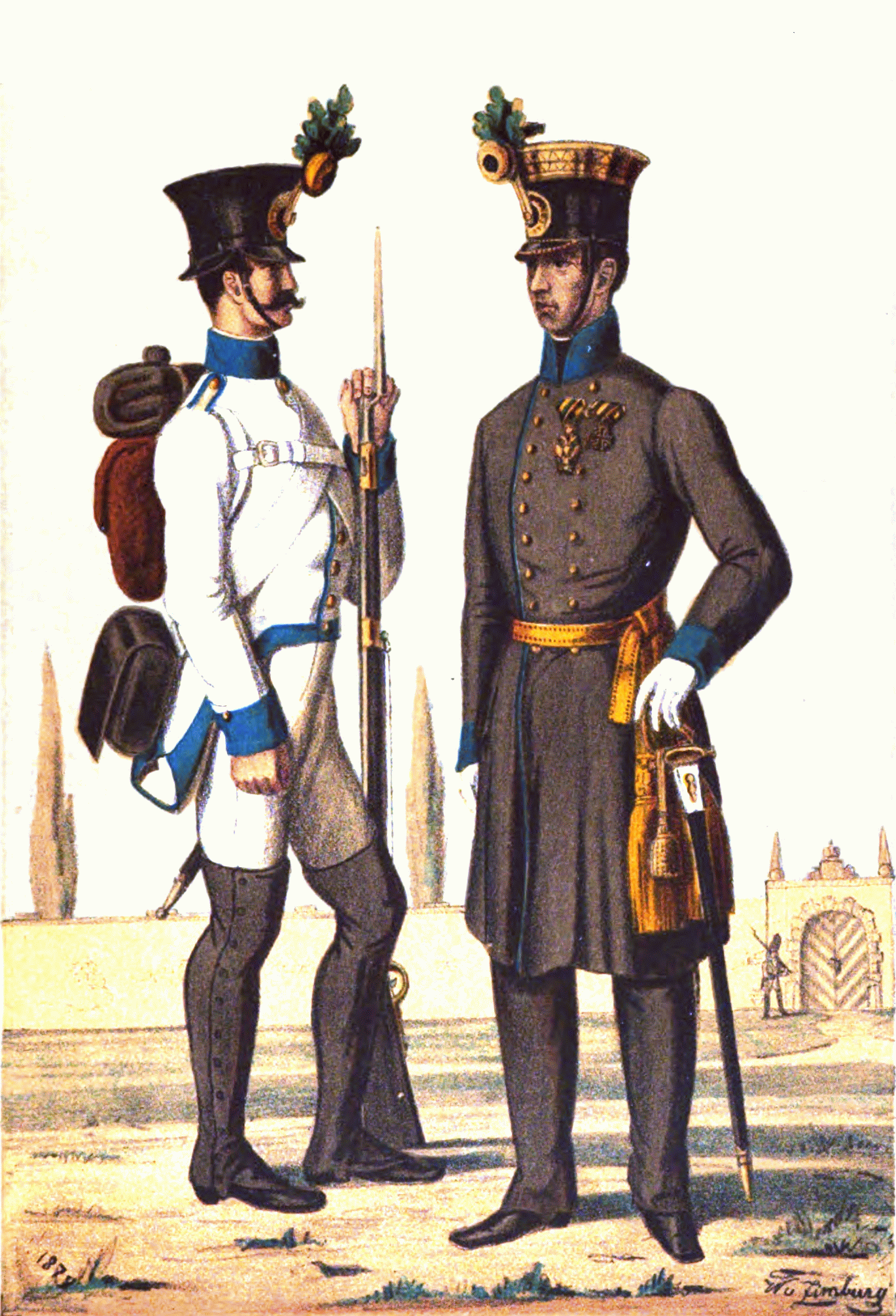
Gemeiner and officer
(1809-1835)

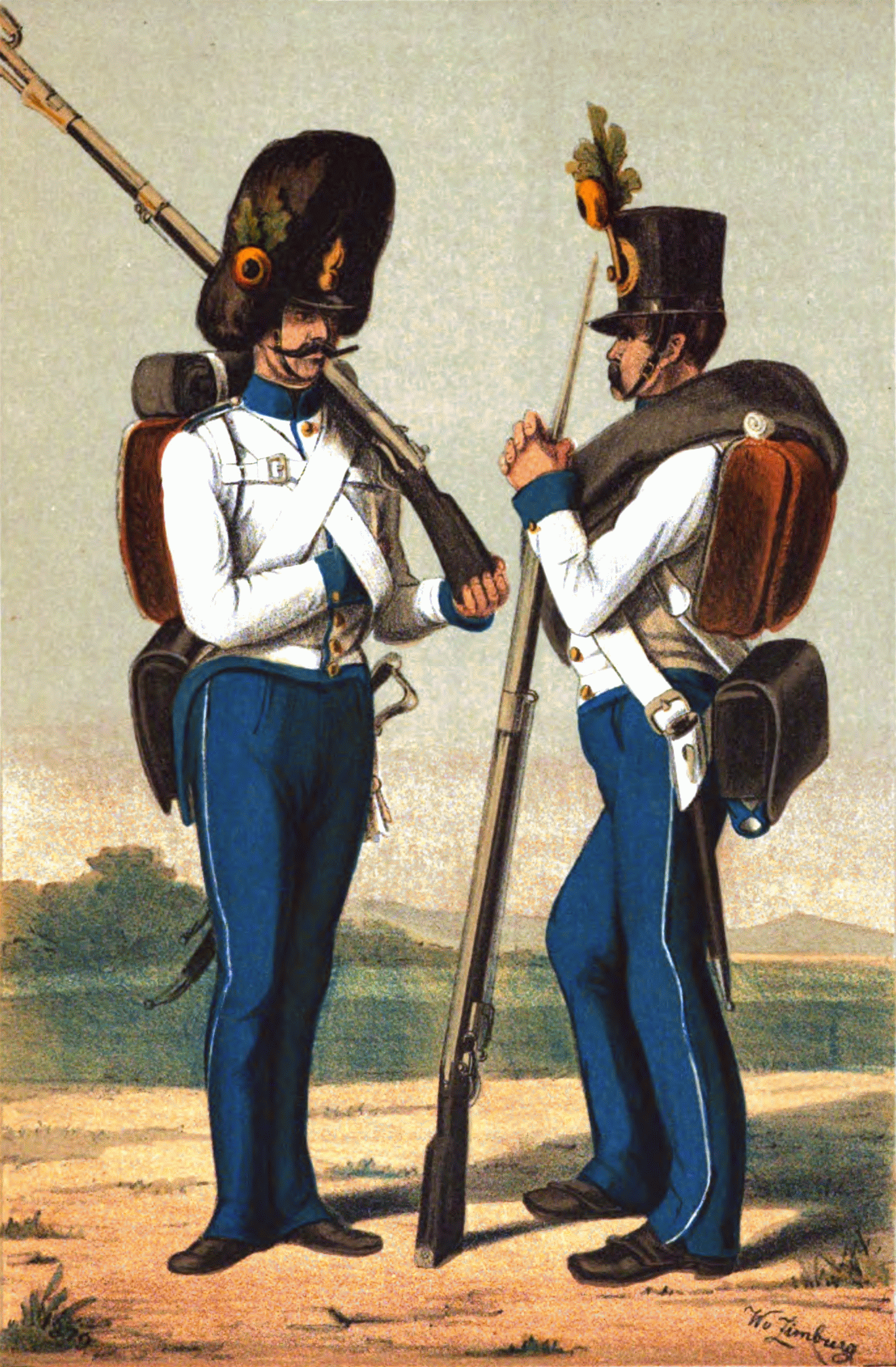
Gemeiner and Grenadier
(1836-1848)

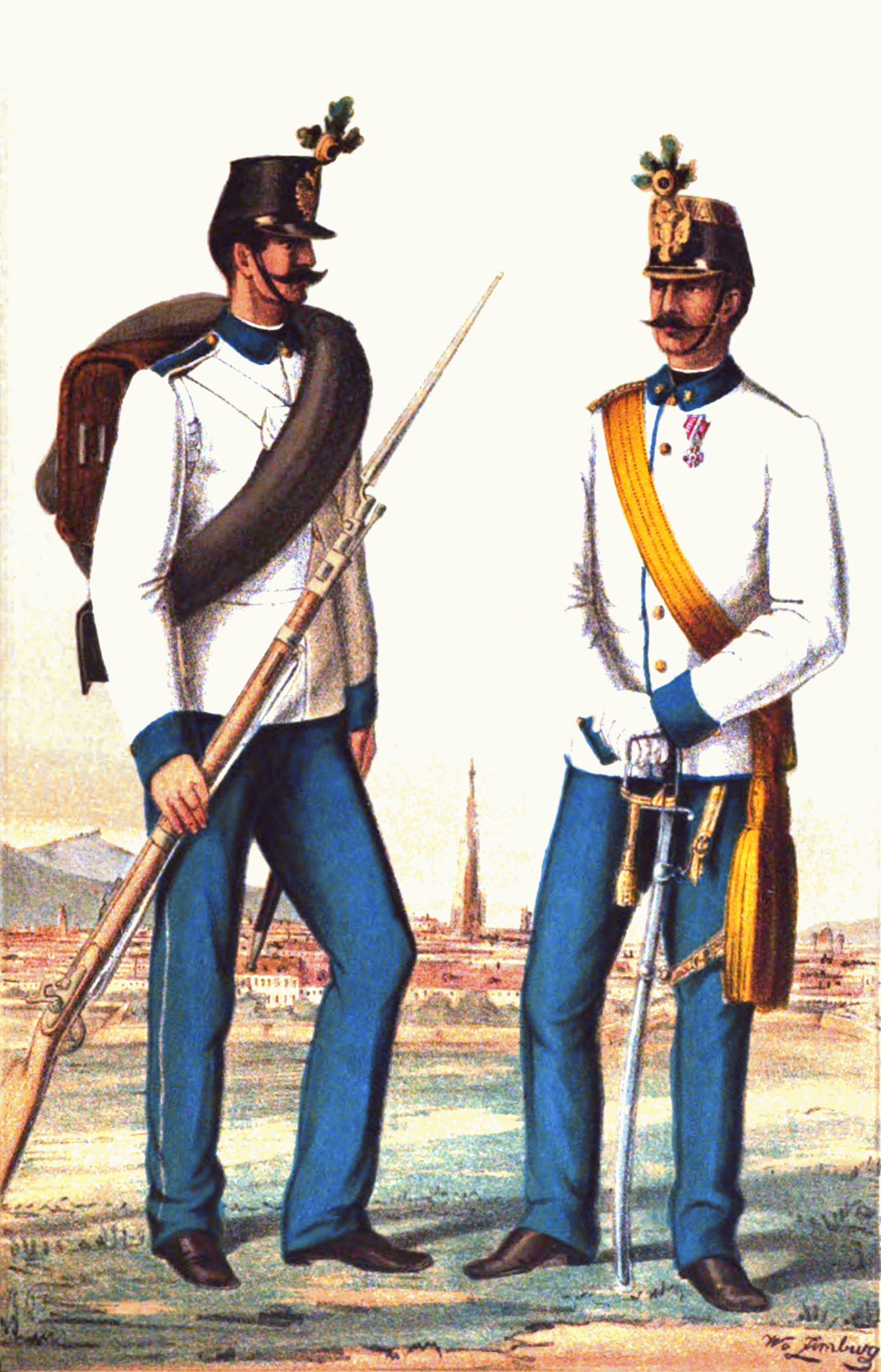
Gemeiner and officer
(1860-1867)

== See also ==
- Rank insignia of the Austro-Hungarian armed forces

== Sources ==
- BROCKHAUS, The encyclopaedia in 24 volumes (1796–2001), Volume 8: 3-7653-3668-8, page 290; definition: «Gemeiner»
