= Infanterist =

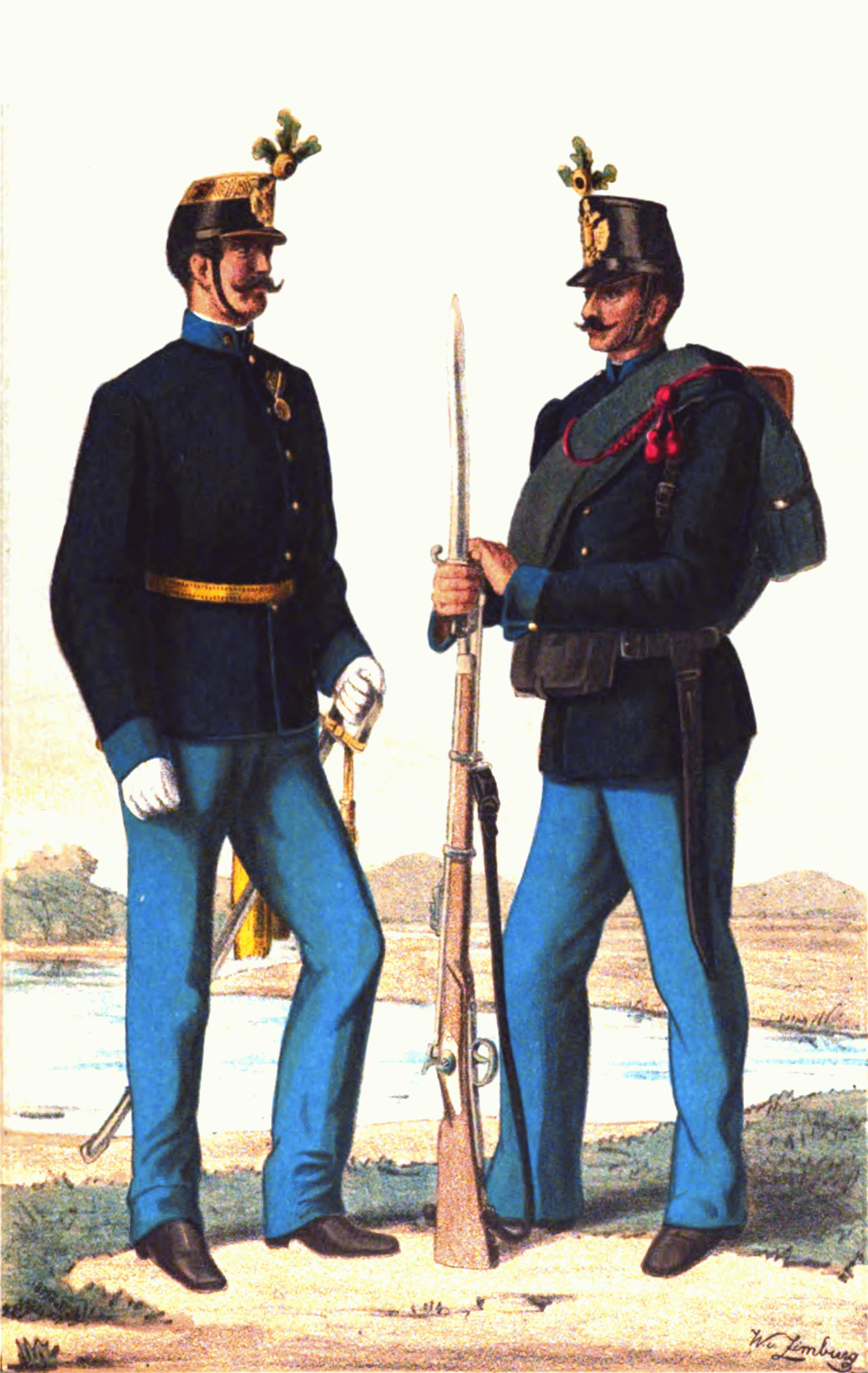
Offizier and Infanterist of the k.u.k. Inf.Rgt. 4, 1867

Infanterist (en: infantryman) – was the designation to the lowest private rank of infantry, the biggest armed forces branch of the common Austro-Hungarian Army (k.u.k. Army) from 1867 to 1918.

However, until 1918 Infanterist was also the common or generic designation to soldiers, rank independent, of the Infantry branch in the Austro-Hungarian Army as well as in the Army of the German Empire.

In line to the appropriate branch of service it did belong to the so-called Gemeine rank group, comparable to private, soldier or G.I. in Anglophone armed forces. Other Gemeine ranks were as follows:

- Dragoner (en: dragoon),
- Füsilier (fusilier or fusileer),
- Grenadier,
- Husar (hussar),
- Infanterist (infantryman)
- Kanonier (gunner, cannoneer),
- Musketier (musketeer), etc.
- Pionier (engineer)
- Sanitätssoldat (medicalman)
- Trainsoldat (trainman)
- Ulan (uhlan)

Sequence of ranks
junior rank no	(Austro-Hungarian armed forces rank); Infanterist	senior rank Korporal

Waffenrock k.u.k Infantrists until 1918

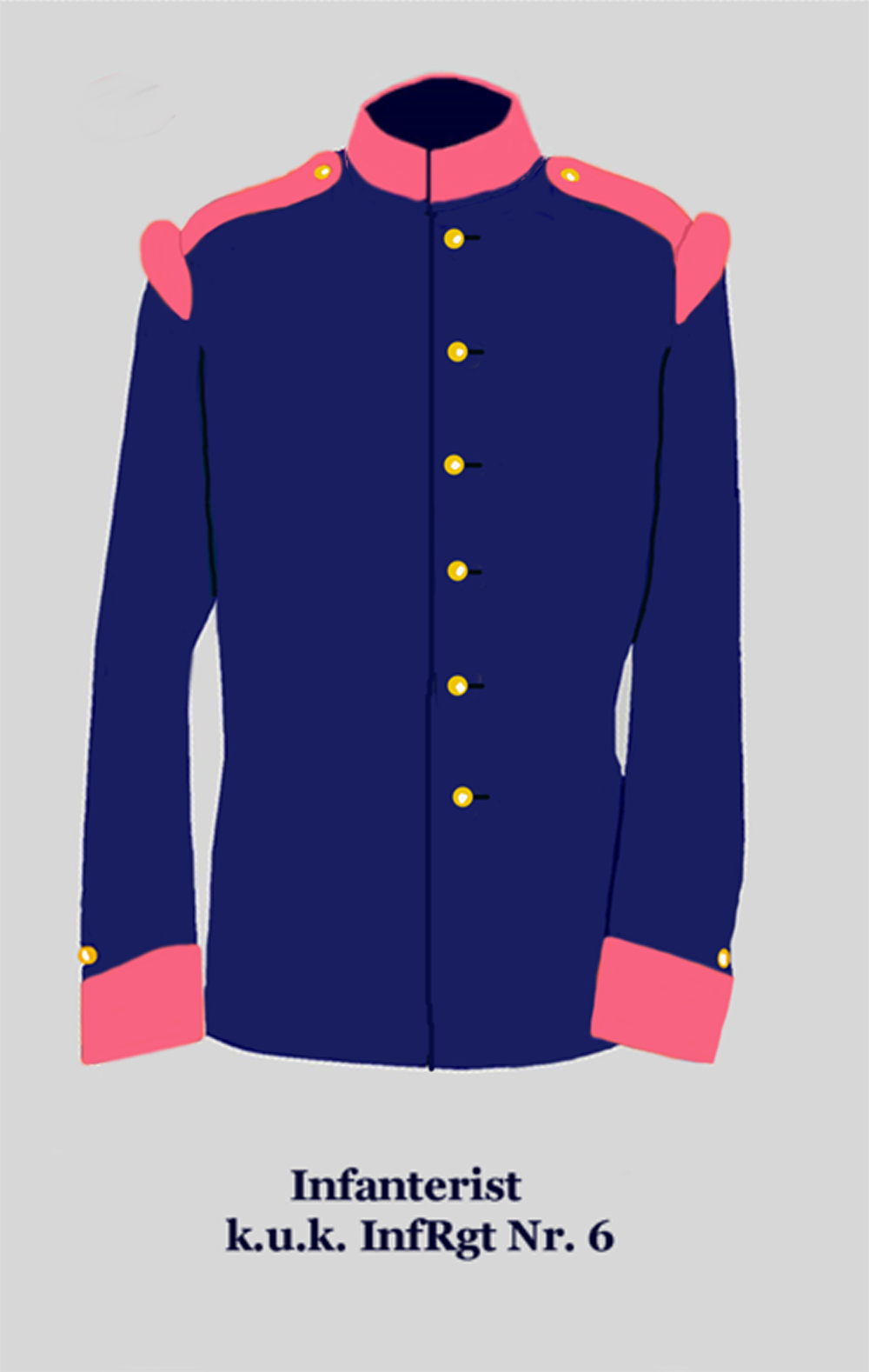
k.u.k Inf.Rgt. 6

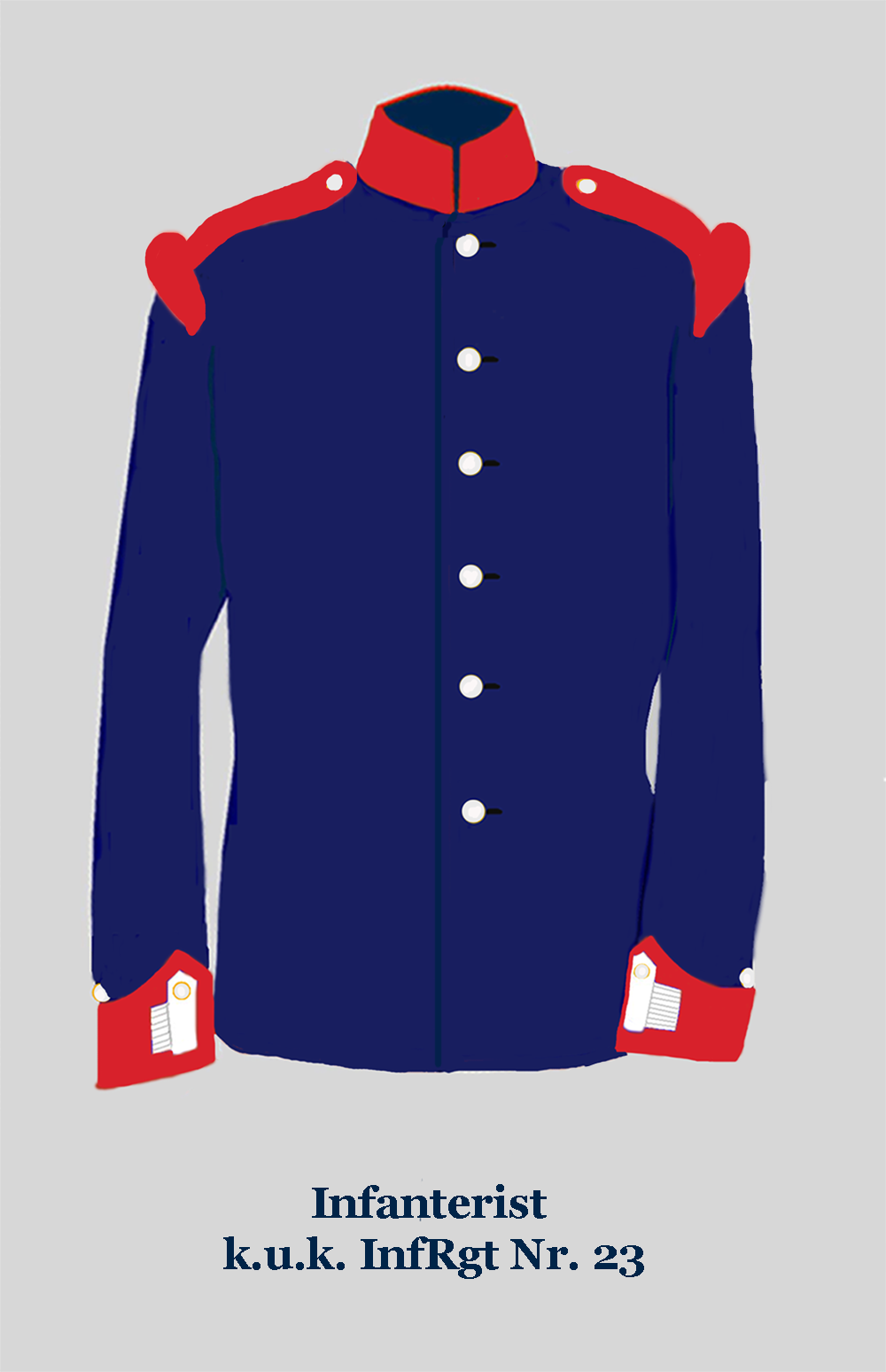
k.u.k Inf.Rgt. 23

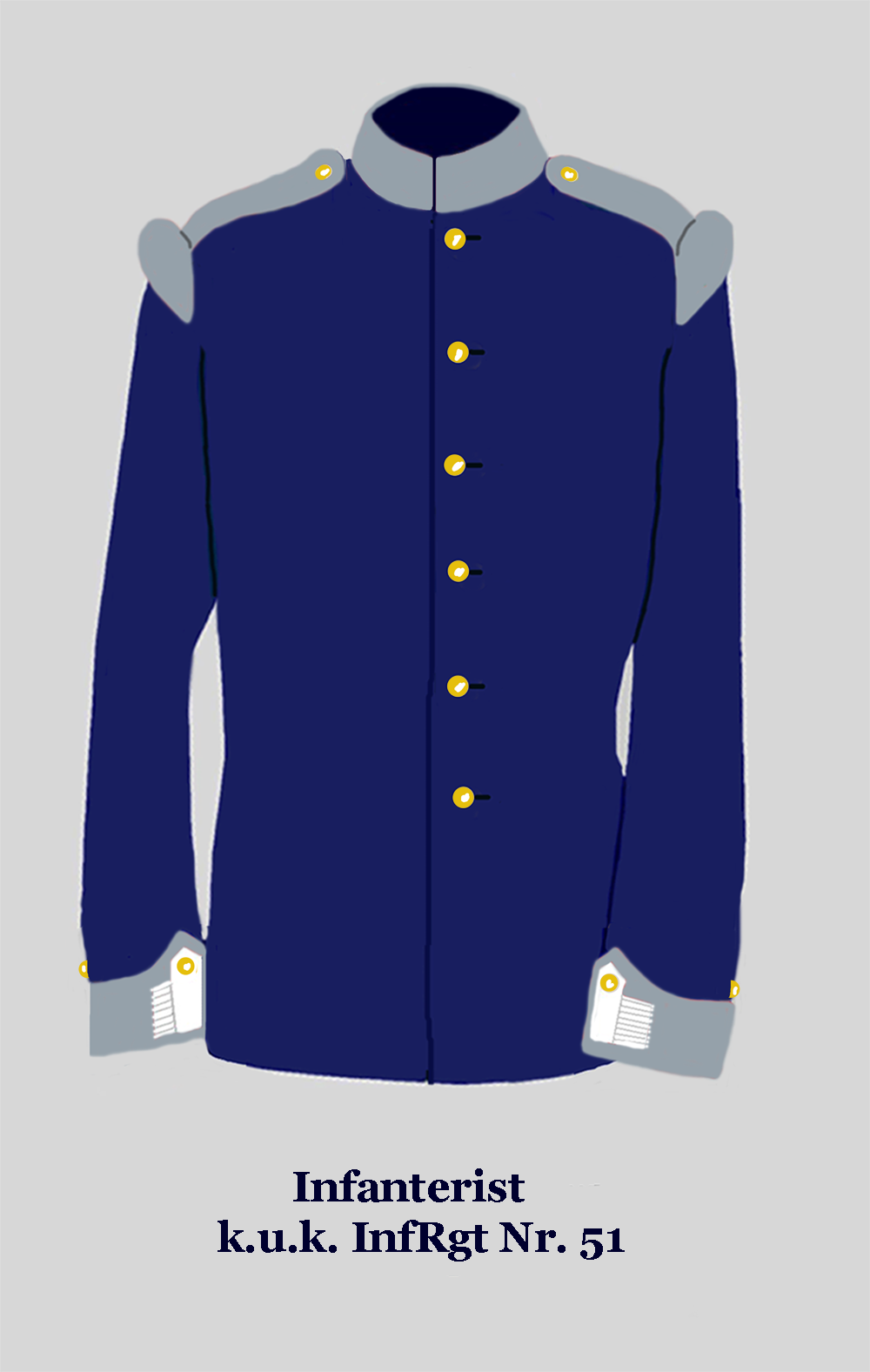
k.u.k Inf.Rgt. 51

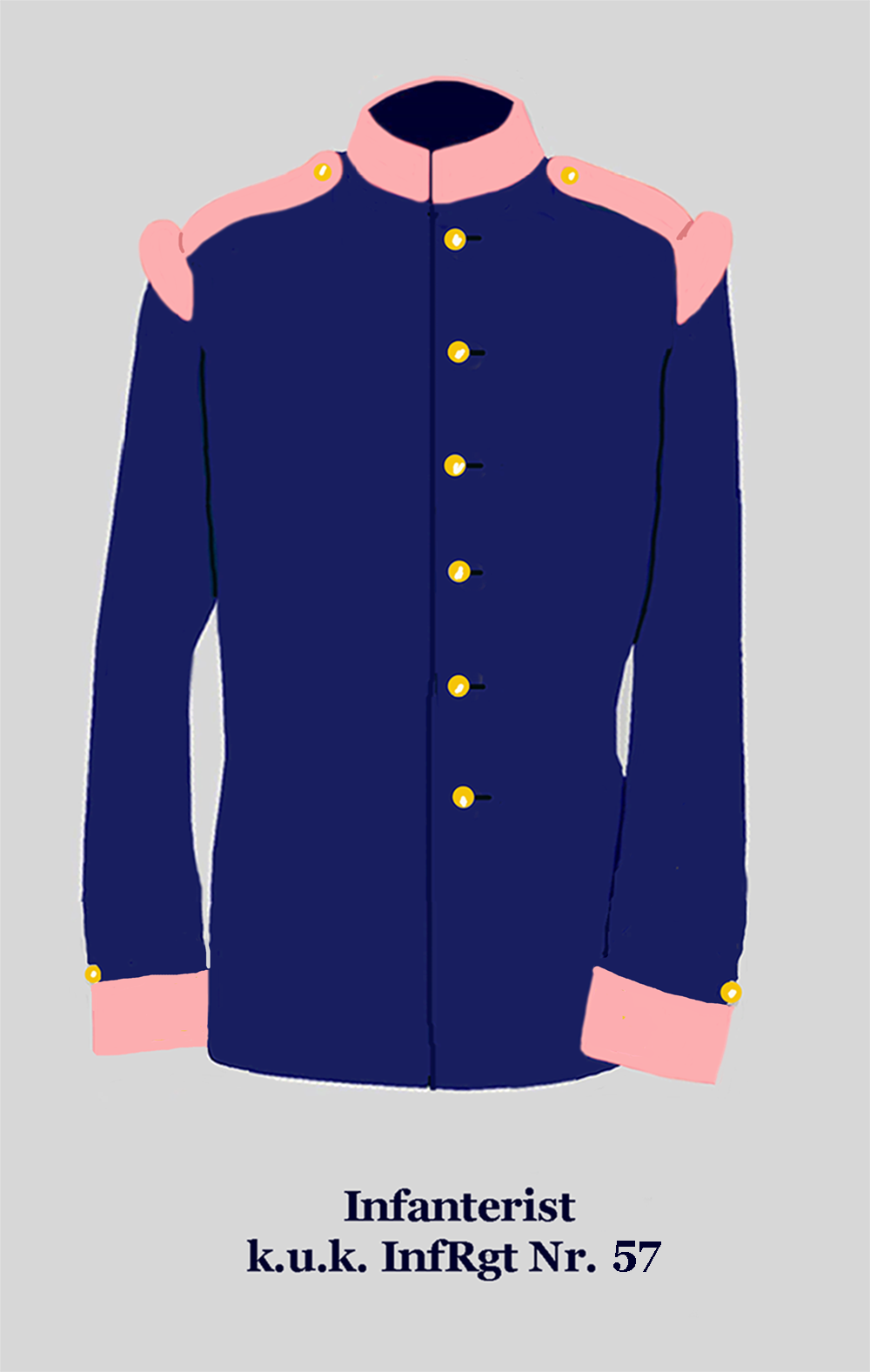
k.u.k Inf.Rgt. 57

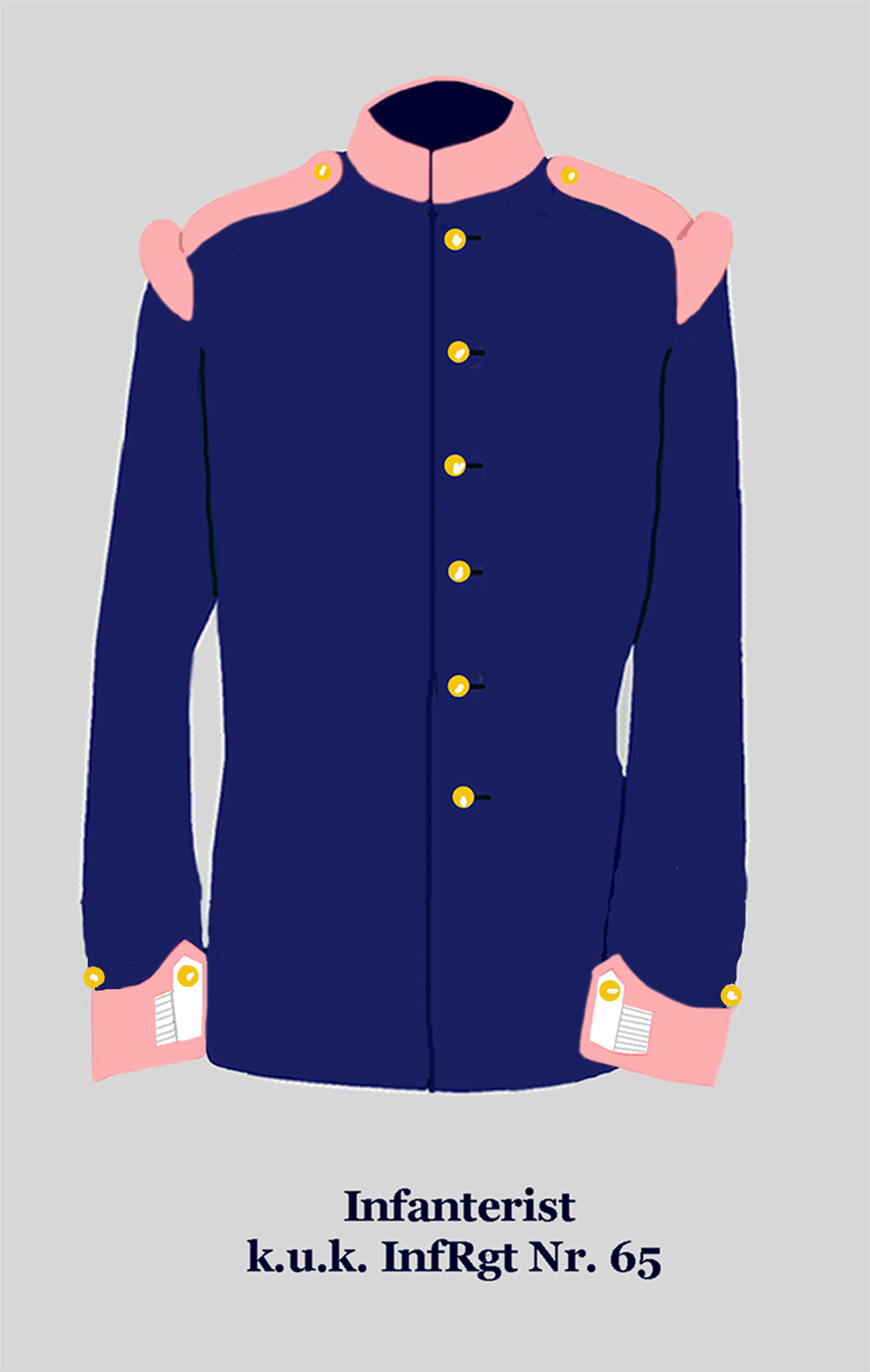
k.u.k Inf.Rgt. 65

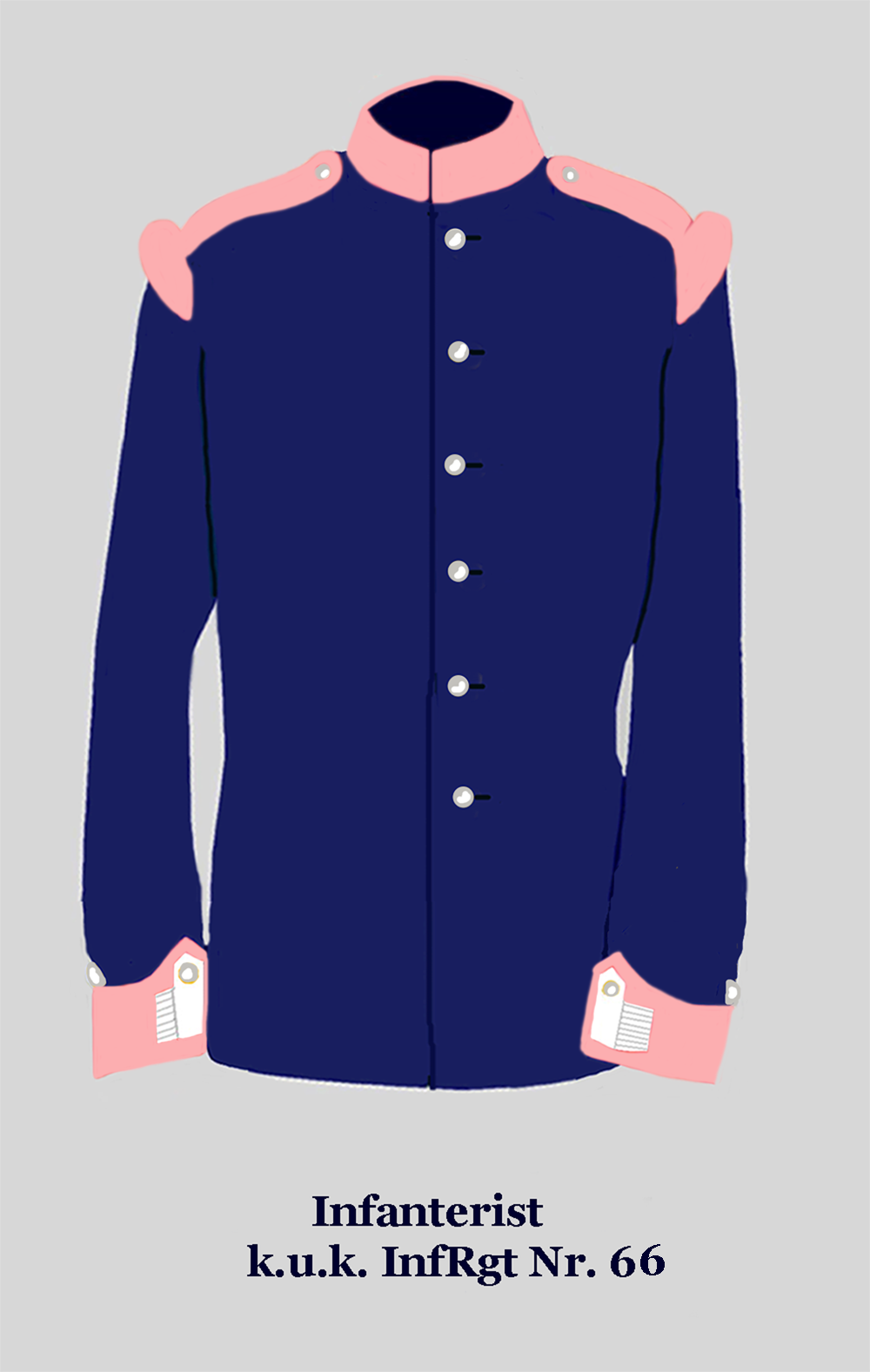
k.u.k Inf.Rgt. 66

== See also ==
- Rank insignia of the Austro-Hungarian armed forces

== Reference/ source ==
- Dictionary to the German military history A-Me, 1st edition (Liz.5, P189/84, LSV:0547, B-Nr. 746 635 0), military publishing house of the GDR (VEB) – Berlin, 1985, Volume 1, page 307, «Infanterist».
- BROCKHAUS, The encyclopedia in 24 volumes (1796–2001), Volume 10: 3-7653-3660-2, page 516; definition: «Infanterie»
