= Army Slavic =

Selection of Slavic vocabulary used in the Austro-Hungarian Army

- Armee-Slawisch
- Created by: Austro-Hungarian Army
- Setting and usage: Military communication
- Era: c. 1867 – 1918
- Purpose: select vocabulary

Language codes
- ISO 639-3: –
- The extent of Slavic people in Austria-Hungary (1910) Slavs Other ethnicities

Army Slavic (German: Armee-Slawisch) was a pidgin consisting of Slavicised German vocabulary with Slavic morphology. It was developed to help overcome language barriers in Austria-Hungary and was in use until the end of World War I.

Part of the reason for the existence of this specialized language was that, while German and Hungarian were official languages, half of the soldiery was recruited from areas that spoke various Slavic languages. In all, there were eleven different official languages to contend with. While efforts were made to keep soldiers grouped by language, mixed language units still occurred.

== Sources ==
- Deak, Istvan (1989). Beyond Nationalism: A Social and Political History of the Habsburg Officer Corps, 1848-1918. Oxford University Press. p. 100.
- Scheer, Tamara (2020). Language diversity and loyalty in the Habsburg army, 1868-1918 (Habilitation Thesis). University of Vienna. p. 184. doi:10.25365/thesis.65387. hdl:11353/10.1393884.
- Walter, John (1999). Central Powers' Small Arms of World War One. Crowood Press. ISBN 1-86126-124-1.

== See also ==
- Army German
- Controlled natural language
