= Austro-Hungarian Army =

Land force of the Austro-Hungarian Dual Monarchy from 1867 to 1918

Army of Austria-Hungary
- Landstreitkräfte Österreich-Ungarns (German), literally "Land Forces of Austria-Hungary"; Császári és Királyi Hadsereg (Hungarian), literally "Imperial and Royal Army"
- Arms of Austria-Hungary
- Active: 1867–1918
- Country: Austria-Hungary
- Allegiance: Emperor of Austria
- Branch: Common Army (Gemeinsame Armee); Imperial-Royal Landwehr (Kaiserlich-Königliche Landwehr); Royal Hungarian Honvéd (Magyar Királyi Honvédség); Royal Croatian Domobranstvo (Hrvatsko Kraljevsko Domobranstvo)
- Type: Army
- Size: 7,800,000 c. 1917
- Part of: Austro-Hungarian Armed Forces
- Engagements: Great Eastern Crisis; Austro-Hungarian occupation of Bosnia and Herzegovina; Boxer Rebellion; World War I

Commanders
- Commander-in-chief: Emperor of Austria

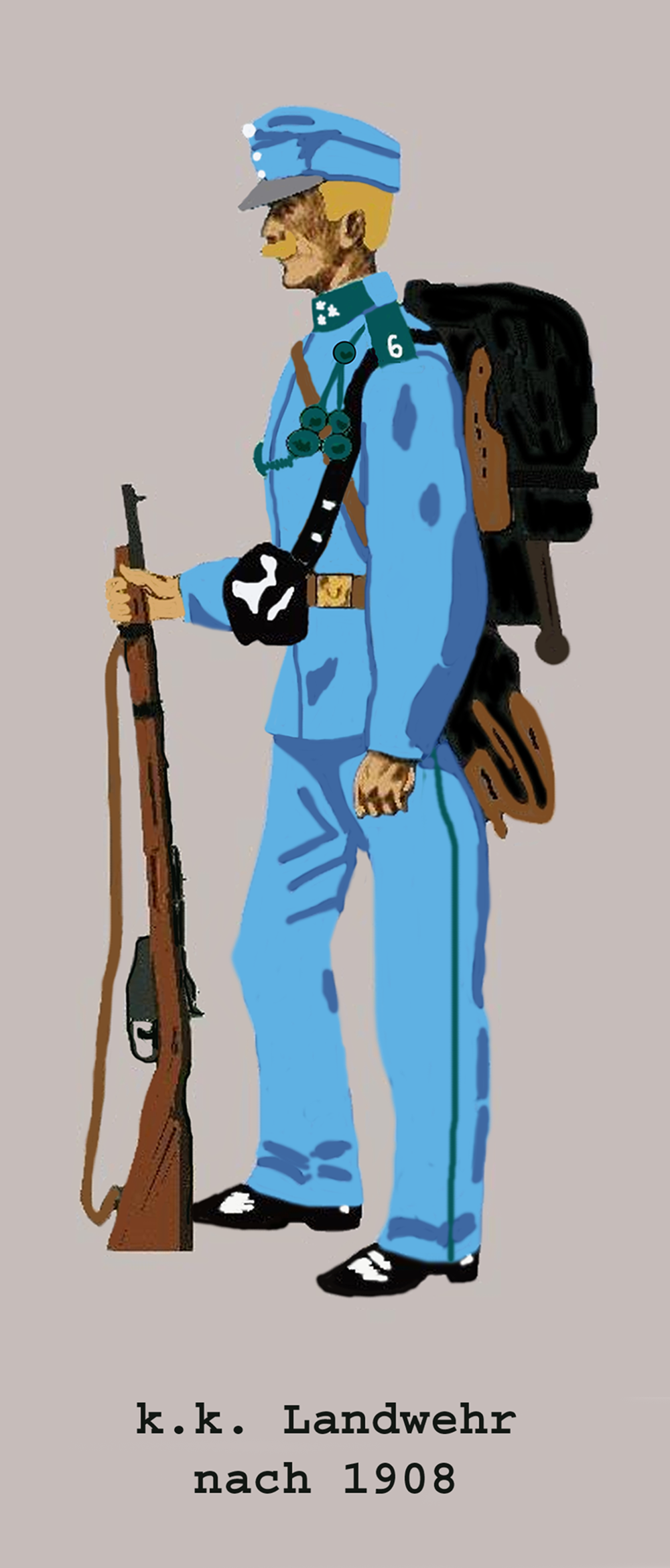
Soldier of the Landwehr-Regiment Nr. 6 in battle dress

The Austro-Hungarian Army, also known as the Imperial and Royal Army, (Note: German: Landstreitkräfte Österreich-Ungarns, lit. 'Land Forces of Austria-Hungary'; Hungarian: Császári és Királyi Hadsereg, lit. 'Imperial and Royal Army') was the principal ground force of Austria-Hungary from 1867 to 1918, one of the two branches of the Austro-Hungarian Armed Forces. It consisted of three organisations: the Common Army (German: Gemeinsame Armee, recruited from all parts of Austria-Hungary), the Imperial-Royal Landwehr (recruited from Cisleithania) and the Royal Hungarian Honvéd,with Royal Croatian Home Guard (recruited from Transleithania).

In the wake of fighting between the Austrian Empire and the Kingdom of Hungary and the subsequent two decades of uneasy co-existence, Hungarian troops served either in ethnically mixed units or were stationed away from Hungarian regions. With the Austro-Hungarian Compromise of 1867, the Austro-Hungarian Army was brought into being. It existed until the disestablishment of Austria-Hungary in 1918 following the end of World War I. Common Army units were generally poorly trained and had very limited access to new equipment, because the governments of the Austrian and Hungarian parts of the empire often preferred to generously fund their own units instead of outfitting all three army branches equally. All Landwehr and Honvéd regiments were composed of three battalions, while Common Army regiments had four.

The long-standing white infantry uniforms were replaced in the later half of the 19th century with dark blue tunics, which in turn were replaced by cadet grey uniforms during the initial stages of World War I. In September 1915, field gray was adopted as the new official uniform colour. As the Common Army was plagued with supply shortages, when field gray uniforms were first introduced, remaining stocks of the preexisting cadet grey uniforms remained in use alongside the newer colour. The last known surviving member of the Austro-Hungarian Army was Franz Künstler, who died in Bad Mergentheim in May 2008 at the age of 107.

== From the Compromise of 1867 to the World War ==
=== Planning and operations ===
The major decisions of 1867–1895 were made by Archduke Albrecht, Duke of Teschen, who was the cousin of the Emperor Franz Joseph and his leading advisor in military affairs. According to historians John Keegan and Andrew Wheatcroft:

He was a firm conservative in all matters, military and civil, and took to writing pamphlets lamenting the state of the Army's morale as well as fighting a fierce rearguard action against all forms of innovation…. Much of the Austrian failure in the First World War can be traced back to his long period of power…. His power was that of the bureaucrat, not the fighting soldier, and his thirty years of command over the peacetime Habsburg Army made it a flabby instrument of war.

In the wake of defeat in the 1866 Austro-Prussian War Austria-Hungary avoided major wars in the era between 1867 and 1914 but engaged in a number of minor military actions. Nevertheless, the general staff maintained plans for major wars against neighboring powers, especially Italy, Serbia and Russia. By contrast, the main enemies Russia and Serbia had engaged in large scale warfare in the decade before the First World War.

In the late 19th century the army was used to suppress unrest in urban areas of the empire: in 1882 and 1887 in Vienna and notably against German nationalists at Graz and Czech nationalists in Prague in November 1897. Soldiers under the command of Conrad von Hotzendorf were also used against Italian rioters in Trieste in 1902.

The most significant action by soldiers of the Dual Monarchy in this period was the Austro-Hungarian occupation of Bosnia and Herzegovina in the summer of 1878. When troops under the command of Josip Filipović and Stjepan Jovanović entered the provinces expecting little or no resistance, they were met with ferocious opposition from elements of both Muslim and Orthodox populations there. Despite setbacks at Maglaj and Tuzla, Sarajevo was occupied in October. Austro-Hungarian casualties amounted to over 5,000 and the unexpected violence of the campaign led to recriminations between commanders and political leaders.

=== Size and ethnic and religious composition ===
In 1868, the number of active-duty troops in the army was 355,000, and the total could be expanded to 800,000 upon mobilization. However, this was significantly less than the European powers of France, the North German Confederation and Russia, each of which could field more than one million men. Though the population of the empire had risen to nearly 50 million by 1900, the size of the army was tied to ceilings established in 1889. Thus, at the start of the 20th century, Austria-Hungary conscripted only 0.29% of its population, compared to 0.47% in Germany, 0.35% in Russia, and 0.75% in France. The 1889 army law was not revised until 1912, which allowed for an increase in annual conscriptions.

The ethnic make-up of the enlisted ranks reflected the diversity of the empire the army served; in 1906, out of every 1000 enlisted men, there were 267 Germans, 223 Hungarians, 135 Czechs, 85 Poles, 81 Ruthenians, 67 Croats, 64 Romanians, 38 Slovaks, 26 Slovenes, and 14 Italians.

To aid communication between the multitude of ethnicities, the army developed a simple language called Army Slavic, based primarily on Czech.

From a religious standpoint, the Austro-Hungarian army officer corps was dominated by Catholics. In 1896, out of 1000 officers, 791 were Catholics, 86 Protestants, 84 Jews, 39 Greek-Orthodox, and one Uniate. Of the pre–World War military forces of the major European powers, the Austro-Hungarian army was almost alone in its regular promotion of Jews to positions of command. While the Jewish population of the lands of the Dual Monarchy 4.4% including Bosnia and Herzegovina), Jews made up nearly 18% of the reserve officer corps. There were no official barriers to military service for Jews, but in later years this tolerance eroded to some extent, as important figures such as Conrad von Hötzendorf and Archduke Franz Ferdinand sometimes expressed anti-Jewish sentiments. Franz Ferdinand was also accused (by Conrad) of discriminating against Protestant officers.

==== Linguistics and translations ====
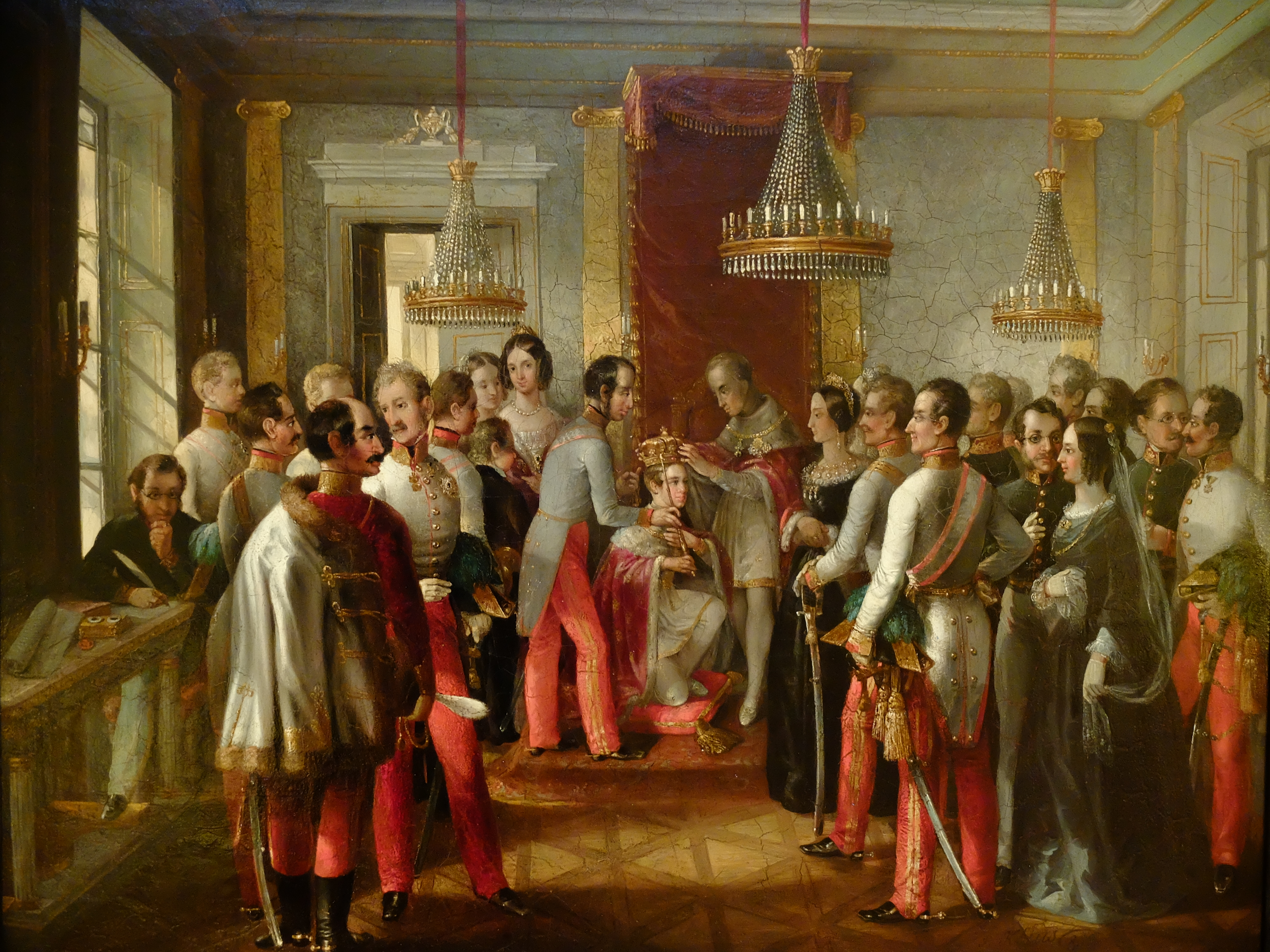
Coronation of Emperor Franz Joseph I, after the signing and translation of the Austro-Hungarian Compromise of 1867

The Austro-Hungarian Empire often suffered from a lack of military interpreters, and this proved to be a major force in the partial dysfunctioning and blunders of the Austrian-Hungarian Empire. Nearly all officers of the upper ranks spoke German (specifically Austrian German), and because only a fraction of soldiers spoke German, this produced a logistical obstacle for organizing the military. Likewise the lack of mutual intelligibility between speakers of Hungarian and German led to a feeling of resentment by many non-Austrian soldiers. The delivery of orders was particularly ineffective, and the bureaucratic and dysfunctional system led to individual ethnic units becoming isolated from the overall high command.

This in turn led to ethnic tensions and political violence in the empire, as such language battalions began instigating mutinies and revolts against the Austrian commanders, whom they saw as out of touch. Desertions and revolts were most common amongst Slavic battalions, particularly the Czech-Slovak battalions; however, all battalions during the war suffered from these logistical challenges. The battalions' use of languages that were not understood by the Austrian commanders also led to it being extremely difficult to impossible to discover attempts at desertion or revolt.

=== Funding and equipment ===
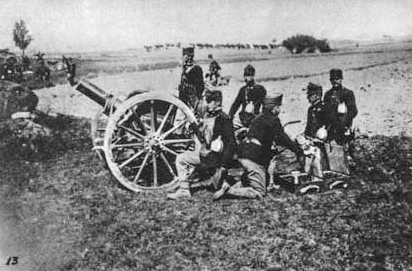
Austro-Hungarian artillery unit appearing in The Illustrated London News in 1914

Following the 1867 constitutional arrangements, the Reichsrat was dominated by German Liberals, who generally regarded the army as a relic of feudalism. In Budapest, legislators were reluctant to authorize funds for the joint army but were generous with the Hungarian branch of the army, the Honvédség. In 1867 the military budget accounted for about 25% of all government spending, but the economic crash of 1873 hit Austria-Hungary hard and foreign observers questioned whether the Dual Monarchy could manage a major war without subsidies. Despite increases throughout the 1850s and 1860s, in the latter half of the century Austria-Hungary was still spending less on its army than were other major European powers. While the budget continued to rise—from 262 million crowns in 1895 to 306 million in 1906—this was still far less per capita than for other major European states, including Italy, and about on par with Russia, which had a much larger population. Further contributing to the monarchy's military weakness was the low rate of conscription: Austria-Hungary conscripted only 0.29% of its population annually, compared to 0.47% in Germany and 0.75% in France. Attempts to increase the yearly intake of recruits were proposed but repeatedly blocked by officials in Budapest until an agreement was reached in 1912.

In the emerging field of military aviation, Austria-Hungary lagged behind other European states. While balloon detachments had been established in 1893, they were mostly assigned to the fortress artillery, except for a brief period from 1909 to 1911 when they were under command of the multifaceted Verkehrs Brigade. Realization that heavier-than-air machines were necessary or useful came late, and Austria-Hungary acquired only five airplanes by 1911. In 1914 the budget for military aviation was approximately 1/25th the amount spent by France. Austria-Hungary entered the war with only 48 first-line aircraft.

Since 1870s the army organised annual Imperial Maneuvers (Kaisermanöver), the largest most significant military exercise of the season, which included military parades of the participating army corps and the multi-day army maneuvers and war games, each year in a different part of the empire, regularly visited by the Emperor and the other Austro-Hungarian royal officials.

== Command Structure ==
Austria-Hungary had a complex military structure. The country had three main distinct ground forces. As a union the Monarchy had a common government of three ministers (Minister of the Imperial Household and Foreign Affairs; Minister of War and Minister of Finance). The Imperial Minister of War had authority over the Common Army and the Navy.

The Common Army was the premier land force. It was the best equipped and had the main role to secure the borders of the Monarchy. In case of war it was to absorb the Austrian Landwehr and the Hungarian Honvéd within its command structure. For that reason the Common Army was organised in army corps even in peacetime, while the Landwehr and Honvéd were organised in territorial districts. The provinces of Bosnia and Herzegovina were governed as a condominium between the Austrian and the Hungarian parts of the dual monarchy. As such the local troops of Bosnian Riflemen were subordinated through the Governor of Bosnia and Herzegovina to the Imperial Minister of War. The general peacetime order of battle of the Common Army included:

- General Staff (Vienna)
  - I. Army Corps (Kraków)
  - II. Army Corps (Vienna)
  - III. Army Corps (Graz)
  - IV. Army Corps (Budapest)
  - V. Army Corps (Pozsony)
  - VI. Army Corps (Kassa)
  - VII. Army Corps (Temesvár)
  - VIII. Army Corps (Prague)
  - IX. Army Corps (Leitmeritz)
  - X. Army Corps (Przemyśl)
  - XI. Army Corps (Lemberg)
  - XII. Army Corps (Nagyszeben)
  - XIII. Army Corps (Zagreb)
  - XIV. Army Corps (Innsbruck)
  - XV. Army Corps (Sarajevo) and
  - XVI. Army Corps (Mostar)

The Austrian part of the monarchy (officially called Kingdoms and Lands Represented in the Imperial Council, unofficially and for short Cisleithania) had its own government. It included the Imperial and Royal Ministry of National Defence (completely independent from the Imperial War Ministry). In peacetime it had complete authority and responsibility for the Imperial-Royal Landwehr and its:

- Landwehr High Command (Vienna)
  - Landwehr Garrison Command in Vienna
  - Landwehr Command in Vienna
  - Landwehr Command in Graz
  - Landwehr Command in Prague
  - Landwehr Command in Leitmeritz
  - Landwehr Command in Kraków
  - Landwehr Command in Przemyśl
  - Landwehr Command in Lemberg
  - Landwehr Command in Ragusa
  - Landwehr Defence Command in Innsbruck
  - Higher Authority for National Defence in Tyrol and Vorarlberg (command of higher status and autonomy)

The Hungarian part of the monarchy (officially called Lands of the Crown of Saint Stephen, unofficially and for short Transleithania) also had its own government. One of its ministries was the Royal Hungarian Honvéd Ministry (also completely independent from the Imperial War Ministry). In peacetime it had complete authority and responsibility for the:

- Honvéd High Command (Budapest)
  - Royal Hungarian I. Budapest Honvéd District Command
  - Royal Hungarian II. Szeged Honvéd District Command
  - Royal Hungarian III. Kassa Honvéd District Command
  - Royal Hungarian IV. Pozsony Honvéd District Command
  - Royal Hungarian V. Kolozsvár Honvéd District Command
  - Royal Hungarian VI. Zagreb Croat-Slavonian District Command (the Kingdom of Croatia-Slavonia was in personal union with Hungary, including a local Croat-Slavonian Homeguard (Landwehr in German), incorporated into the Honvéd as its sixth territorial district)

== Austro-Hungarian Army in July 1914 ==
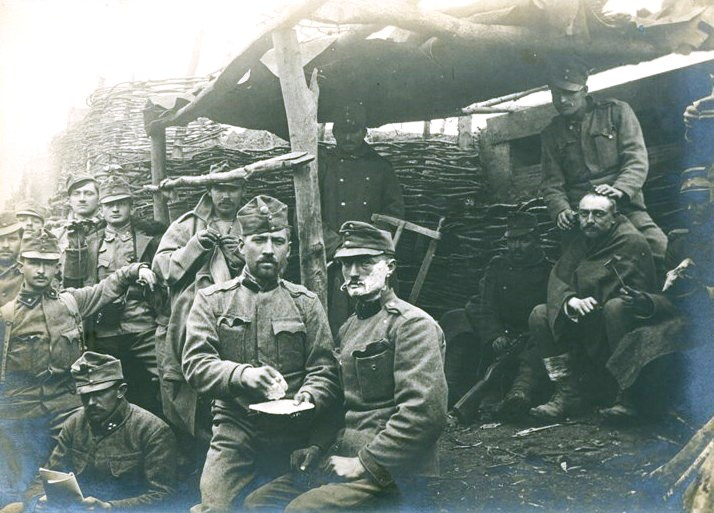
Austro-Hungarian soldiers resting in a trench

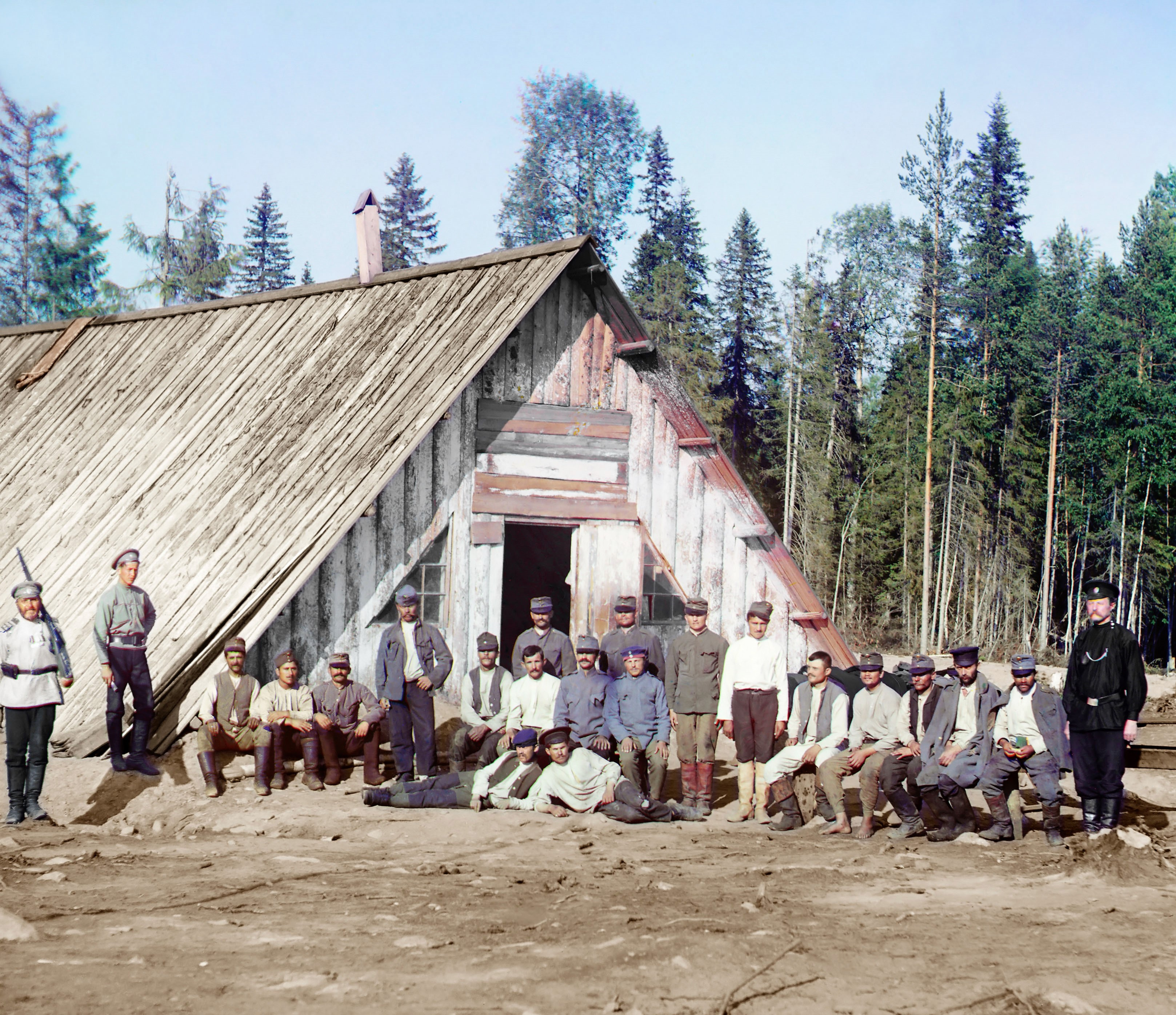
Austro-Hungarian POWs in Russia, 1915; photo by Prokudin-Gorskii

- 36,000 Officers
- 414,000 NCOs and troops
- 120,000 horses (estimate)
- 1,200 artillery pieces

Official designations were as follows:

- regiments of the common army were designated Imperial and Royal (German: "kaiserlich und königlich" (k.u.k.); Hungarian: "Császári és Királyi"), in which Imperial stands for the Kaiser of Austria, who was also King of Hungary.
- Austrian Landwehr regiments were Imperial-Royal (German: kaiserlich-königlich (k.k.), in which Imperial stands for the Kaiser of Austria, who was also King of Bohemia in the Austrian part of the dual monarchy (kaiserlich österreichisch/königlich böhmisch)); Hungarian: császári/királyi)
- Hungarian Honvéd regiments were called Royal Hungarian for the Kaiser's title of Apostolic King of Hungary (German: königlich ungarisch; Hungarian: Magyar Királyi). Within the Hungarian part of Austria-Hungary the monarch was also King of Croatia-Slavonia, this was however not included in the titles of the Honvéd's units.

After war was declared, 3.35 million men (including the first call-up of the reserves and the 1914 recruits) gathered for action.

The Austro-Hungarian Imperial Army was officially under the control of the Commander-in-Chief, Emperor Franz Josef. By 1914, however, Franz Josef was 84 years old and the chief of staff, Count Franz Conrad von Hötzendorf, effectively had more power over the armed forces. Conrad favored an aggressive foreign policy and advocated the use of military action to solve Austria-Hungary's territorial disputes with Italy and Serbia.

Archduke Friedrich, Duke of Teschen was appointed Supreme Commander of the Austro-Hungarian army by Franz Joseph on July 11, 1914. It was thought he would not interfere with the operational and tactical plans of Conrad von Hötzendorf. Friedrich remained Supreme Commander until February 1917, when Emperor Charles I decided to assume the office himself.

=== Common Army ===
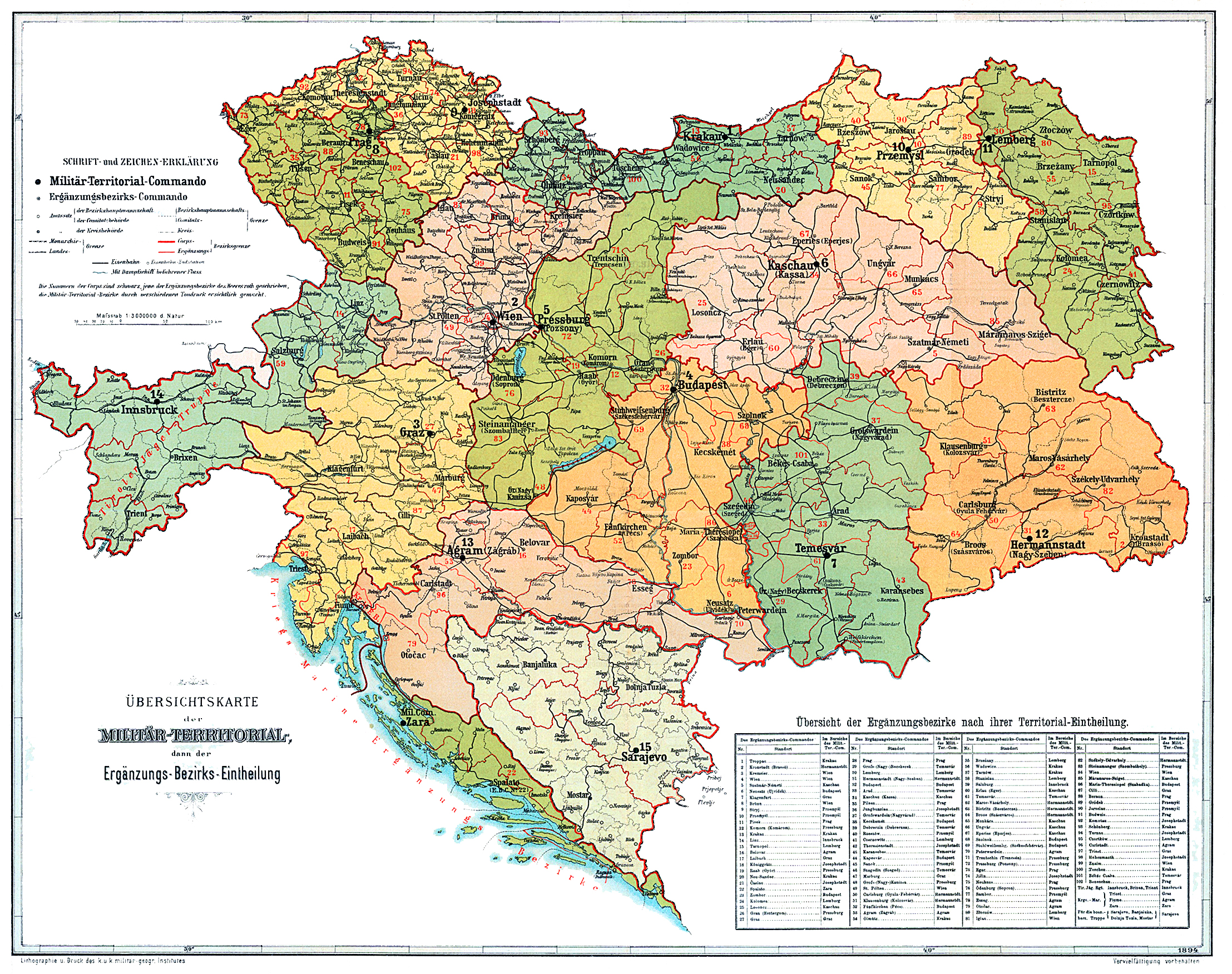
Corps areas in the Austro-Hungarian Army

The Common Army (k.u.k.—kaiserlich und königlich) consisted of:

- 16 corps
- 49 infantry divisions: 76 infantry brigades, 14 mountain brigades
- 22 cavalry divisions: 44 cavalry brigades
- 102 infantry regiments (each of four battalions), including 4 Bosnian-Herzegovinian (Bosnisch-Hercegowinische) infantry regiments (each of four battalions)
- 4 Imperial Tyrolian rifle regiments (Tiroler Kaiserjäger) (each of four battalions)
- 32 rifle battalions (Feldjäger), including 1 Bosnian-Herzegovinian rifle battalion (Bosnisch-Hercegowinisches Feldjäger Bataillon)
- 42 field artillery regiments (Feldkanonen-Regimenter), including 14 field howitzer regiments (Feldhaubitz-Regimenter)
- 15 mounted artillery battalions (originally named Reitende Artillerie Division), 14 heavy howitzer battalions (originally named schwere Haubitz-Division)
- 11 mountain artillery regiments (Gebirgsartillerie Regimenter)
- 6 fortress artillery regiments (Festungsartillerie Regimenter): 8 independent fortress artillery battalions (selbst. Festungsartillerie Bataillone)
- 15 regiments of dragoons (Dragoner), 16 regiments of hussars (Husaren), 11 regiments of lancers (Ulanen)
- 16 transport battalions (railway)
- 23 engineer battalions (Sappeure/Pioniere), 1 bridge construction battalion (Brücken Bataillon), 1 railway regiment (Eisenbahn-Regiment), 1 telegraph regiment (Telegraphen-Regiment)

=== Imperial-Royal Landwehr ===
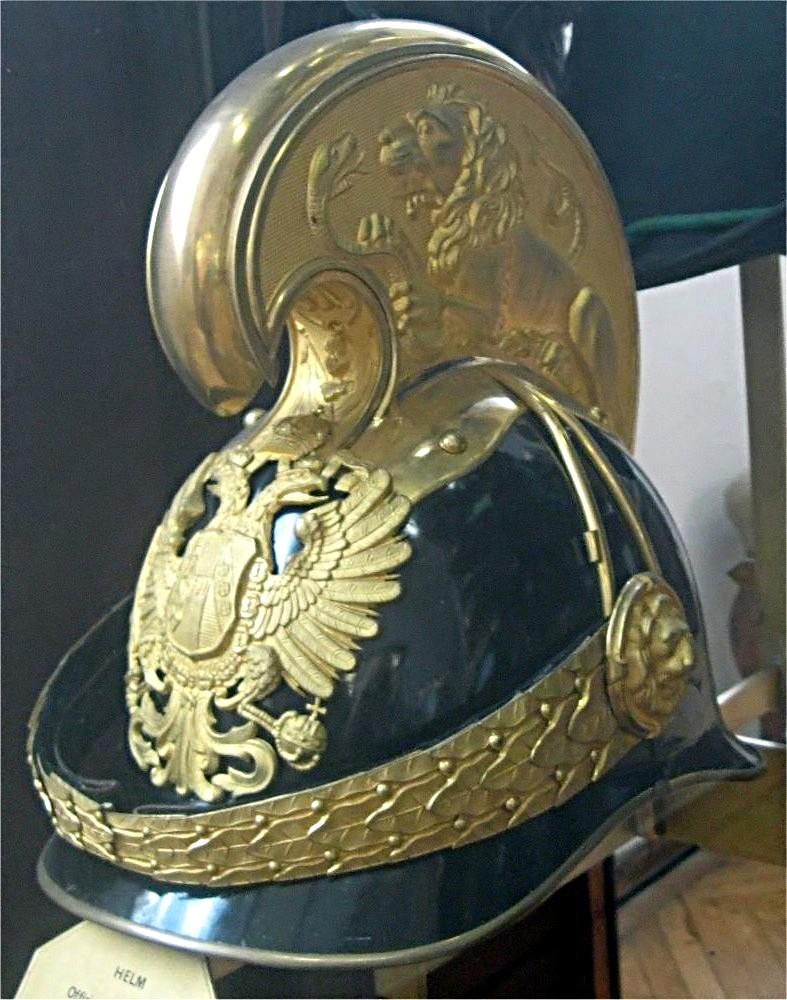
Officer's helmet, Imperial and Royal Dragoons

The Imperial-Royal Landwehr (k.k. or kaiserlich österreichisch/königlich böhmisch) was the standing army of Austria responsible for the defence of Austria itself.

- 35 Landwehr infantry regiments: each of 3 battalions (Landwehr Infanterie-Regimenter)
- 6 Landwehr regiments of lancers (uhlans)
- 8 Landwehr field artillery battalions (Feldkanonen), 8 Landwehr field howitzer battalions (Feldhaubitz)

The mountain infantry had the following units:

- 2 Landwehr mountain infantry regiments (Gebirgsinfanterie-Regimenter), the 4th and 27th
- 3 Tyrolean rifle regiments (Tiroler Landesschützen Regimenter)—from January 1917 named "imperial rifles" (Kaiserschützen)
- 1 mounted Tyrolean rifle battalion (Reitende Tiroler Landesschützen)
- 1 mounted Dalmatian rifle battalion (Reitende Dalmatiner Landesschützen)

=== Royal Hungarian Landwehr ===
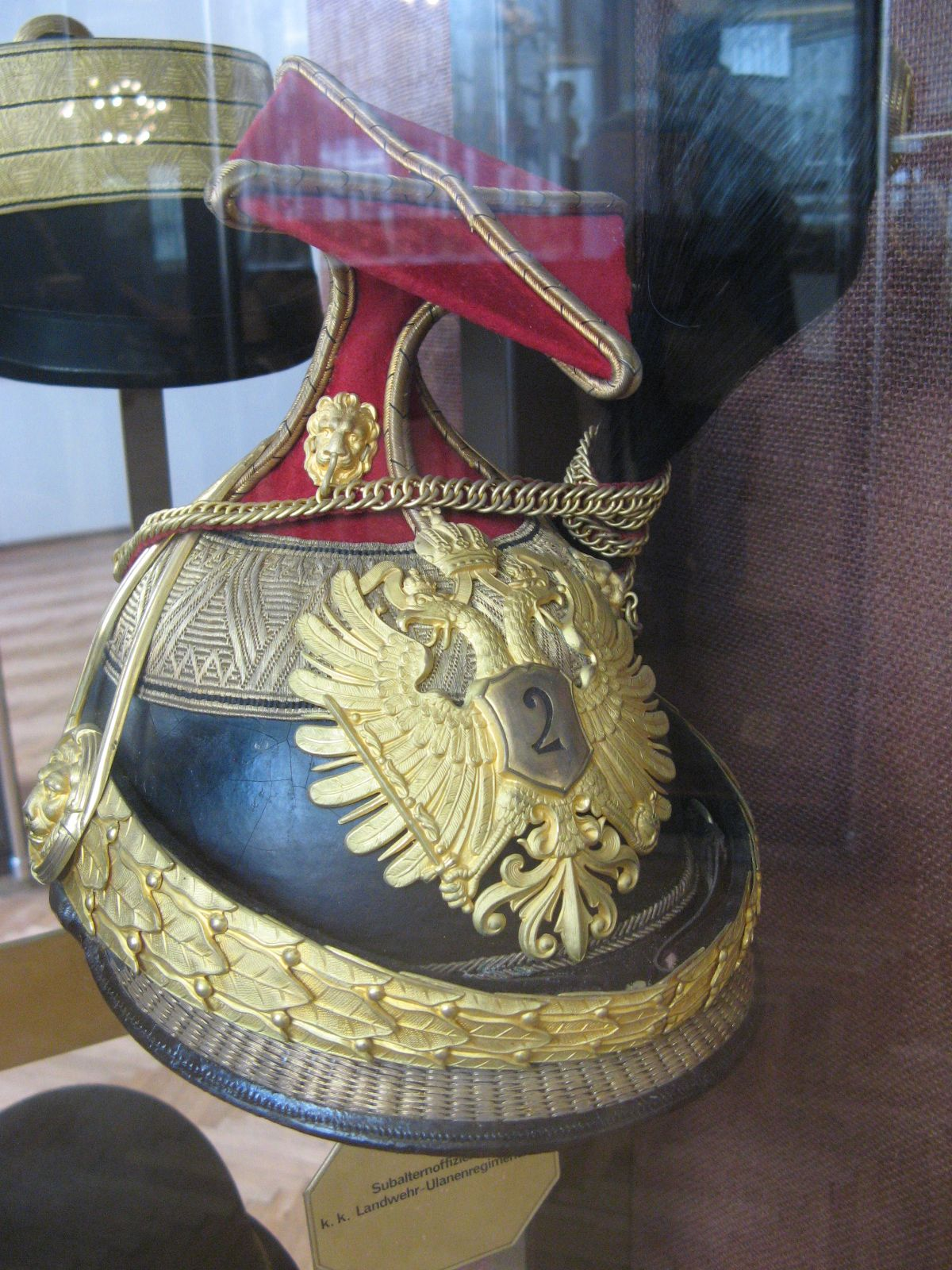
Officer's Czapka (cap), 2nd Landwehr Lancers

The Royal Hungarian Landwehr (königlich ungarische Landwehr) or Royal Hungarian Honvéd (k.u. Honvéd) was the standing army of Hungary. A part of the Honvéd was the Royal Croatian Landwehr (Kraljevsko hrvatsko domobranstvo), which consisted of 1 infantry division (out of 7 in Honvéd) and 1 cavalry regiment (out of 10 in the Honvéd).

- 6 Landwehr districts (honvéd katonai kerület)
- 2 infantry divisions (honvéd gyalogos hadosztály)
- 9 cavalry divisions (honvéd lovassági hadosztály)
- 4 infantry brigades (honvéd gyalogosdandár)
- 12 independent infantry brigades (honvéd önálló gyalogdandár)
- 18 cavalry brigades (honvéd lovasdandár)
- 32 infantry regiments (honvéd gyalogezred)
- 10 regiments of hussars (honvéd huszárezred)
- 8 field artillery regiments (honvéd tábori tüzérezred)
- 2 horse artillery battalion (honvéd lóvontatású tüzérosztály)

The infantry regiments of the k.u.k. army had four battalions each; the infantry regiments of the k.k. and k.u. Landwehr had three battalions each, except the 3rd Regiment of the "Tiroler Landesschützen" (Tyrolian fusiliers), that had also four battalions.

In 1915 units that had nicknames or names of honour lost them by order of the War Ministry. Thereafter units were designated only by number. For instance, the k.u.k. Infanterie-Regiment (Hoch und Deutschmeister) Nr. 4 became Infanterie-Regiment No. 4 (4th Infantry Regiment).

== Landsturm ==
The Landsturm consisted of men aged 34 to 55 who belonged to the Austria k.k. Landsturm and the Hungarian k.u. Landsturm. The Landsturm formed 40 regiments totaling 136 battalions in Austria and 32 regiments totaling 97 battalions in Hungary. The Landsturm was a reserve force intended to provide replacements for the first line units. However, the Landsturm provided 20 brigades who took to the field with the rest of the army.

== Standschützen ==
The Standschützen (singular: Standschütze (Note: The German word Standschütze is derived from Schützenstand or Schießstand, which means "firing point" or "firing range", and generally refers to the members of a local shooting club – the Schießstand, Schützenstand or Schützenverein – in German-speaking countries. These were in essence volunteer militia. They still exist today, albeit their role is purely social and ceremonial.)) were originally rifle guilds and rifle companies that had been formed in the 15th and 16th centuries, and were involved time and again in military operations within the borders of the Austrian County of Tyrol. A Standschütze was a member of a Schützenstand ("shooting club"), into which he was enrolled, (Note: enrolliert is the Austrian military jargon for "enrolled" (from the Old French enroller).) which automatically committed him to the voluntary, military protection of the state of Tyrol (and Vorarlberg). In effect they were a type of Tyrolean local militia or home guard.

== Ranks and rank insignia ==
=== Commissioned officer ranks ===
The rank insignia of commissioned officers.

Rank group	General / flag officers					Senior officers			Junior officers
Rank insignia
German	Feldmarschall	Generaloberst	General der Waffengattung	Feldmarschall-Leutnant	Generalmajor	Oberst	Oberstleutnant	Major	Hauptmann / Rittmeister	Oberleutnant	Leutnant
Hungarian	Tábornagy	Vezérezredes	Tábornok	Altábornagy	Vezérőrnagy	Ezredes	Alezredes	Őrnagy	Százados / Kapitány	Főhadnagy	Hadnagy

=== Other ranks ===
The rank insignia of non-commissioned officers and enlisted personnel.

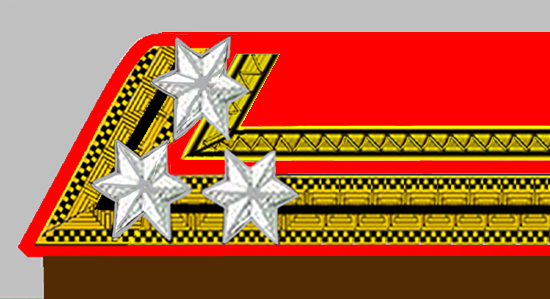
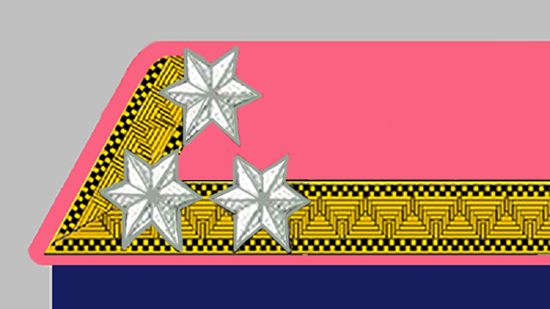
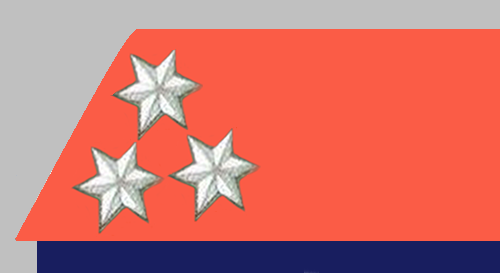
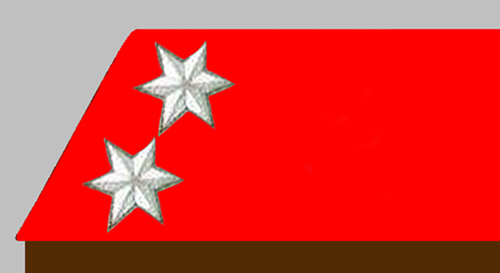
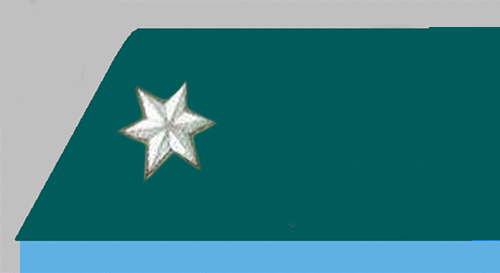
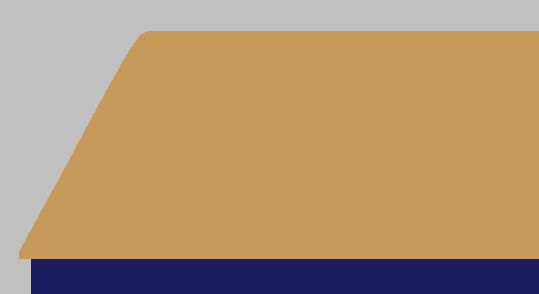
Rank group	Senior NCO		Junior NCO			Private
Rank insignia
German	Stabsfeldwebel	Feldwebel	Zugsführer	Korporal	Gefreiter	Infanterist
Hungarian	Törzsőrmester	Őrmester	Szakaszvezető	Tizedes	Őrvezető	Honvéd

== Types of uniforms ==
see: Category:Military coats of Austria-Hungary

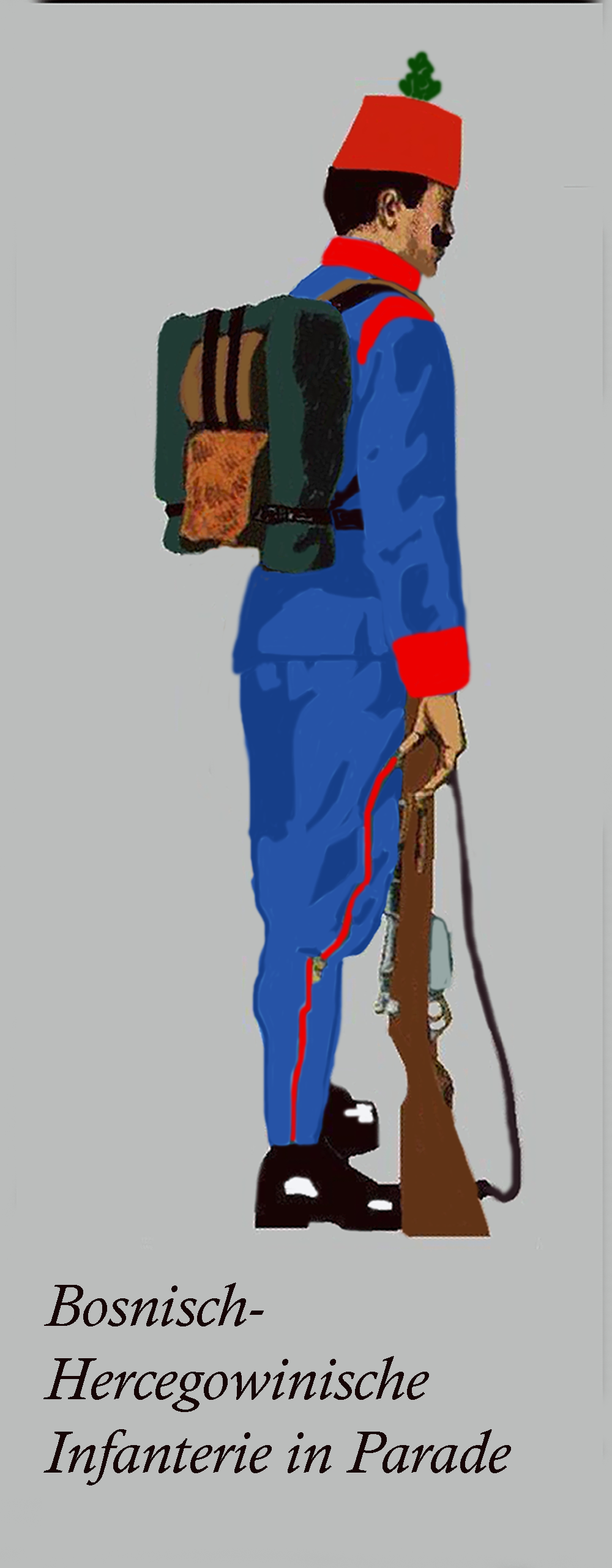
Bosnian-Herzegovinian Infantry

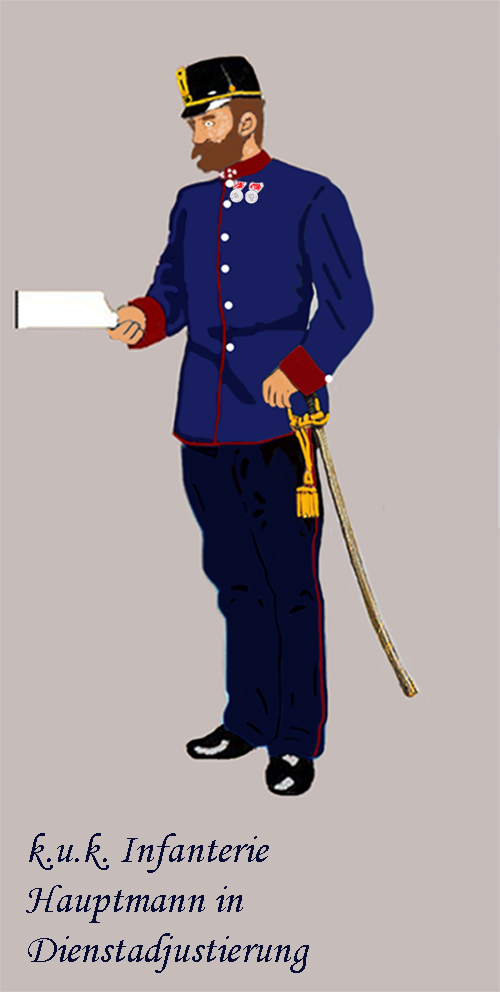
Infantry officer in service dress

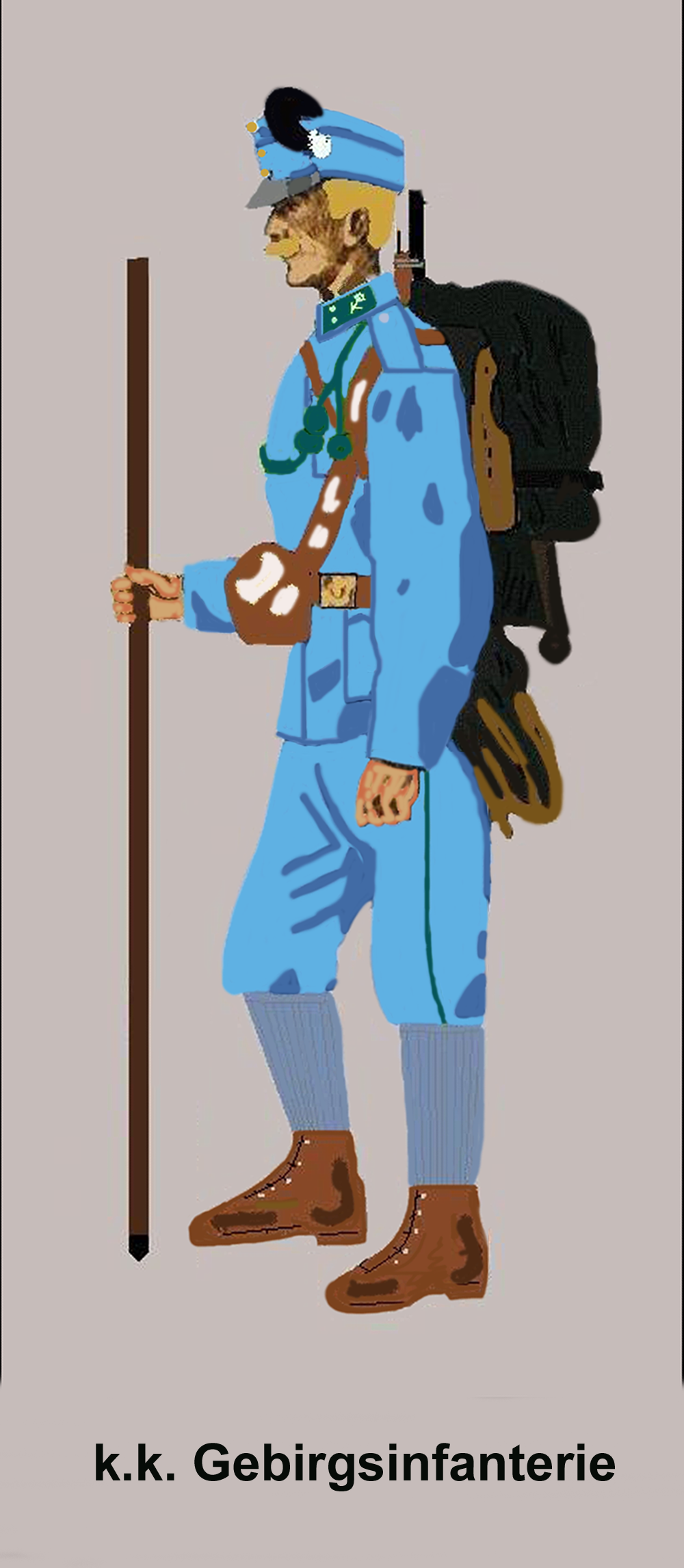
Mountain Rifles soldier in battle dress

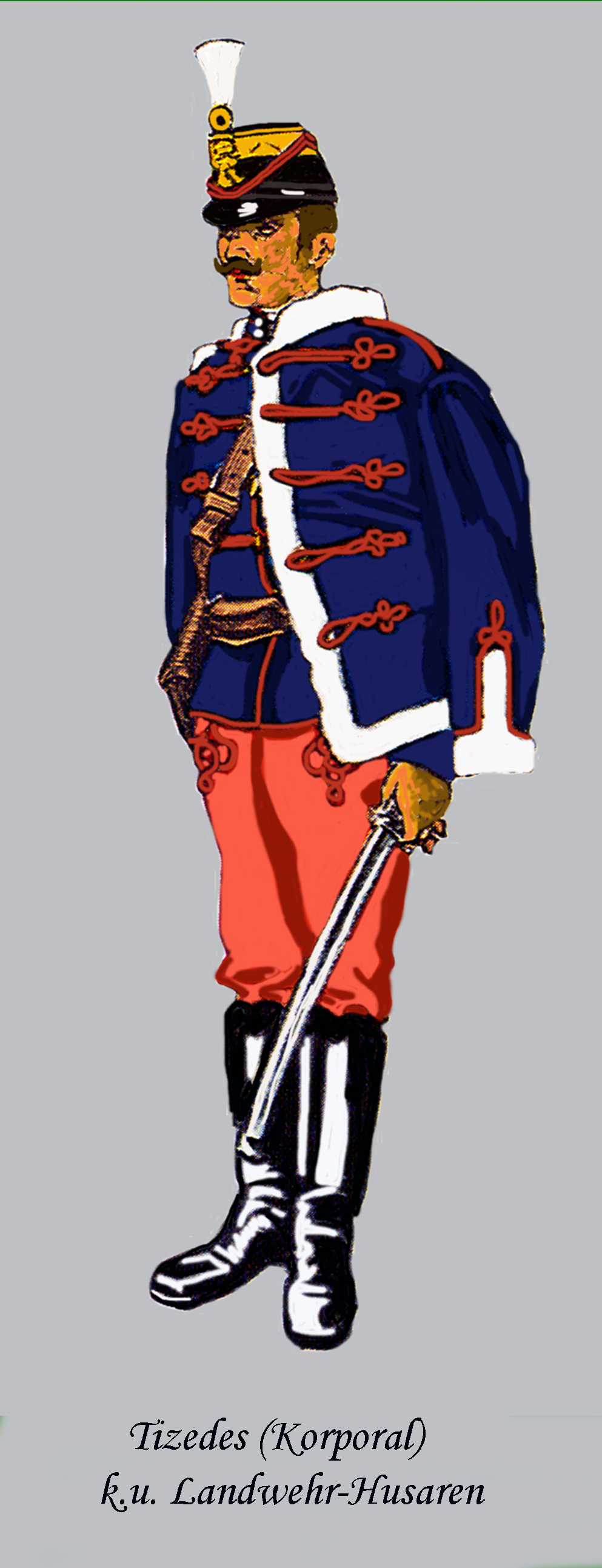
Hussar of the Honvéd

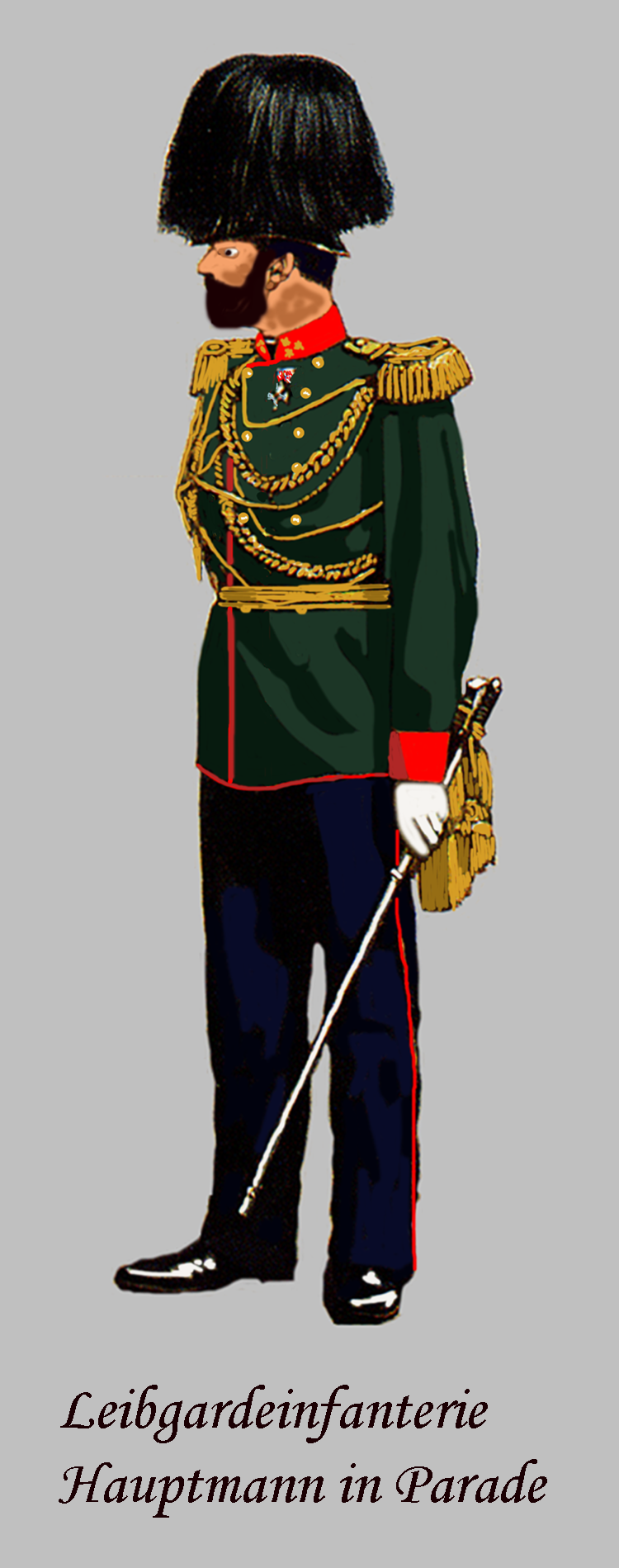
Captain of the Life Guard Infantry

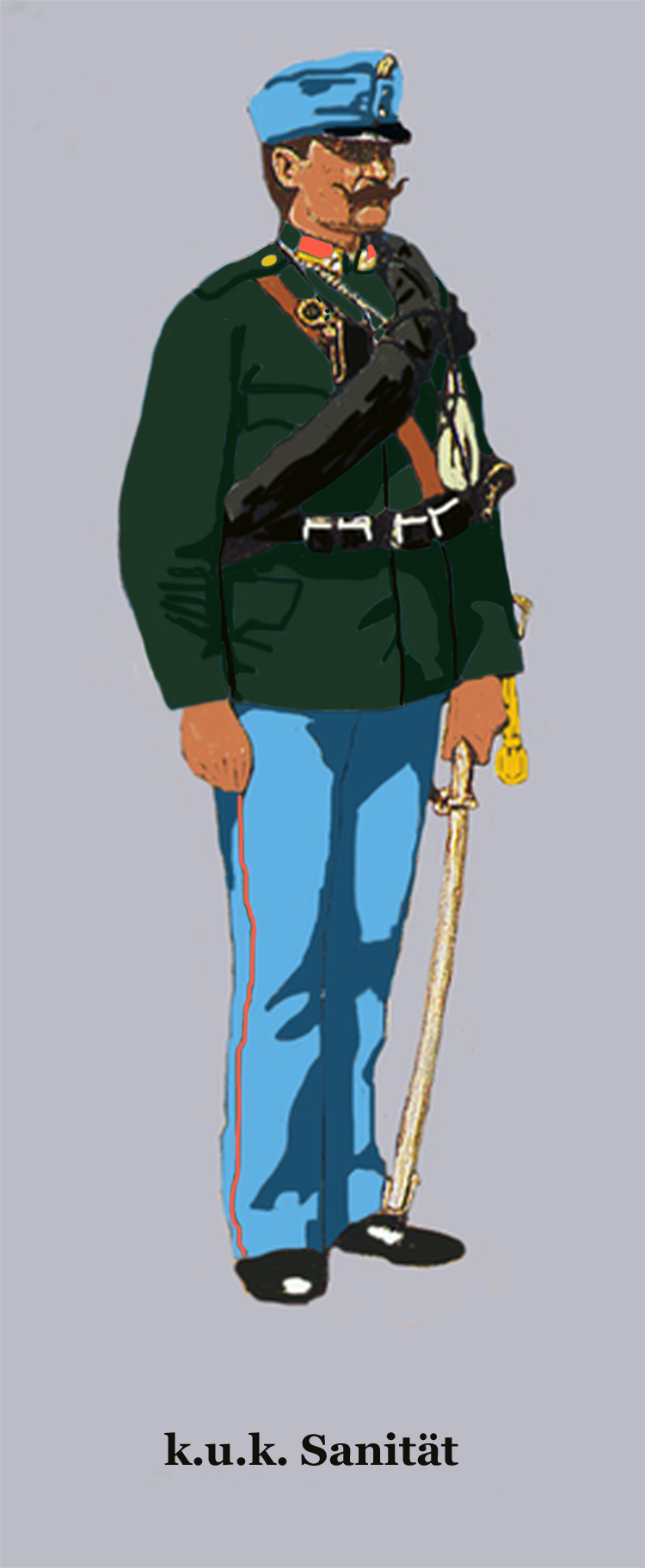
Master-Sergeant of the Medical Corps

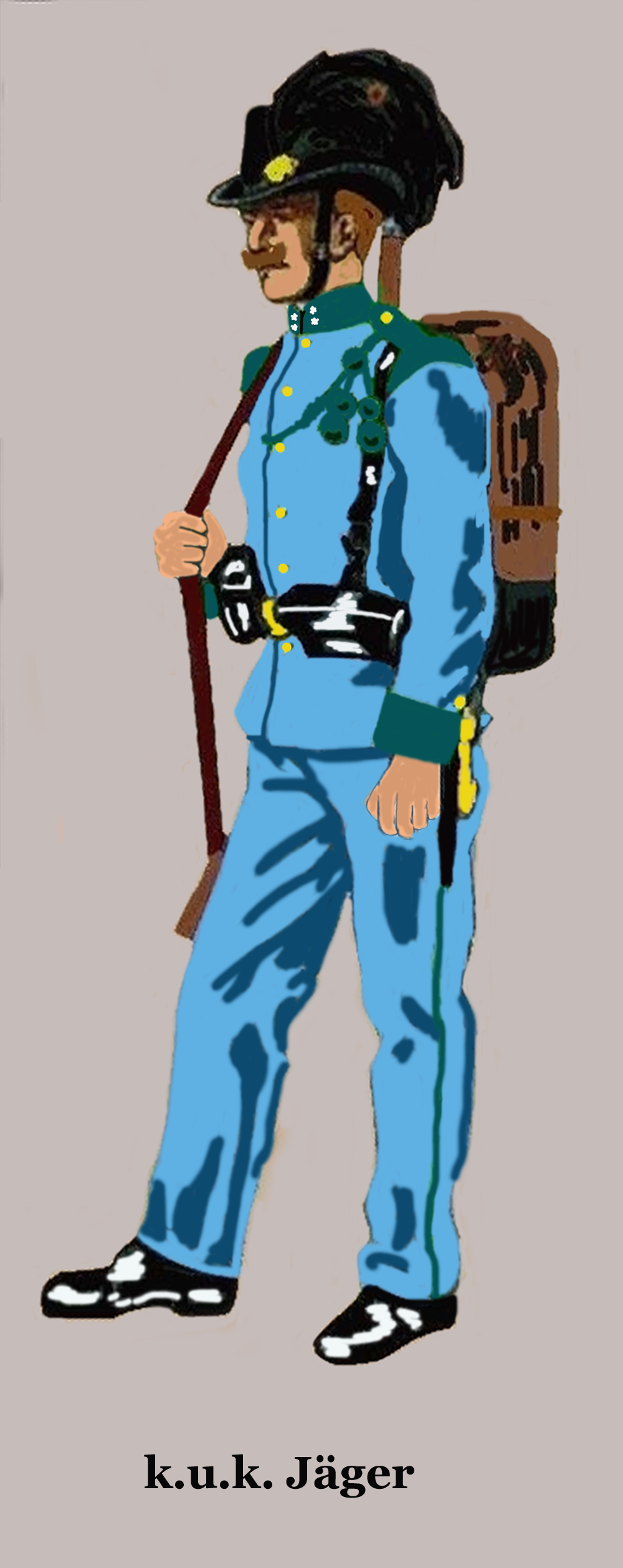
Unterjäger in parade uniform

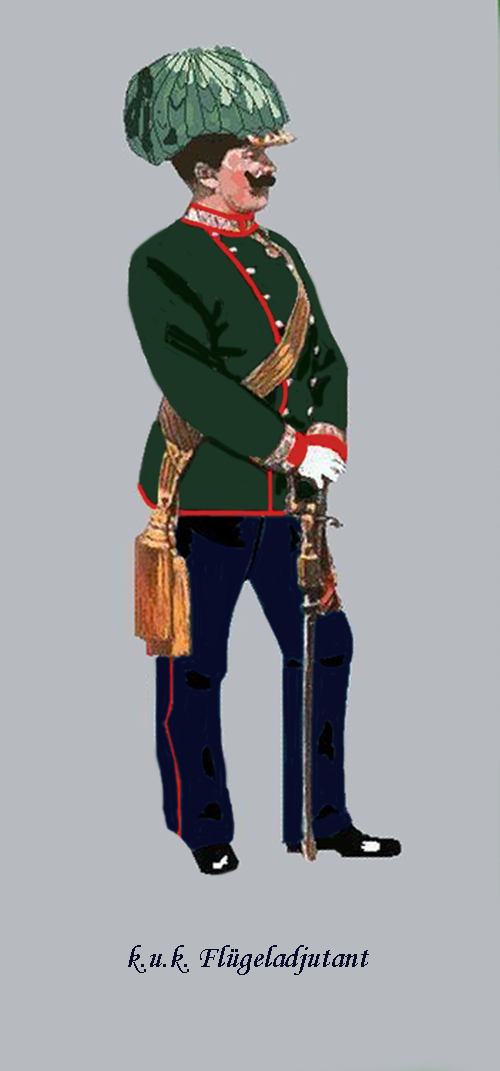
Adjutant of His Majesty the Emperor

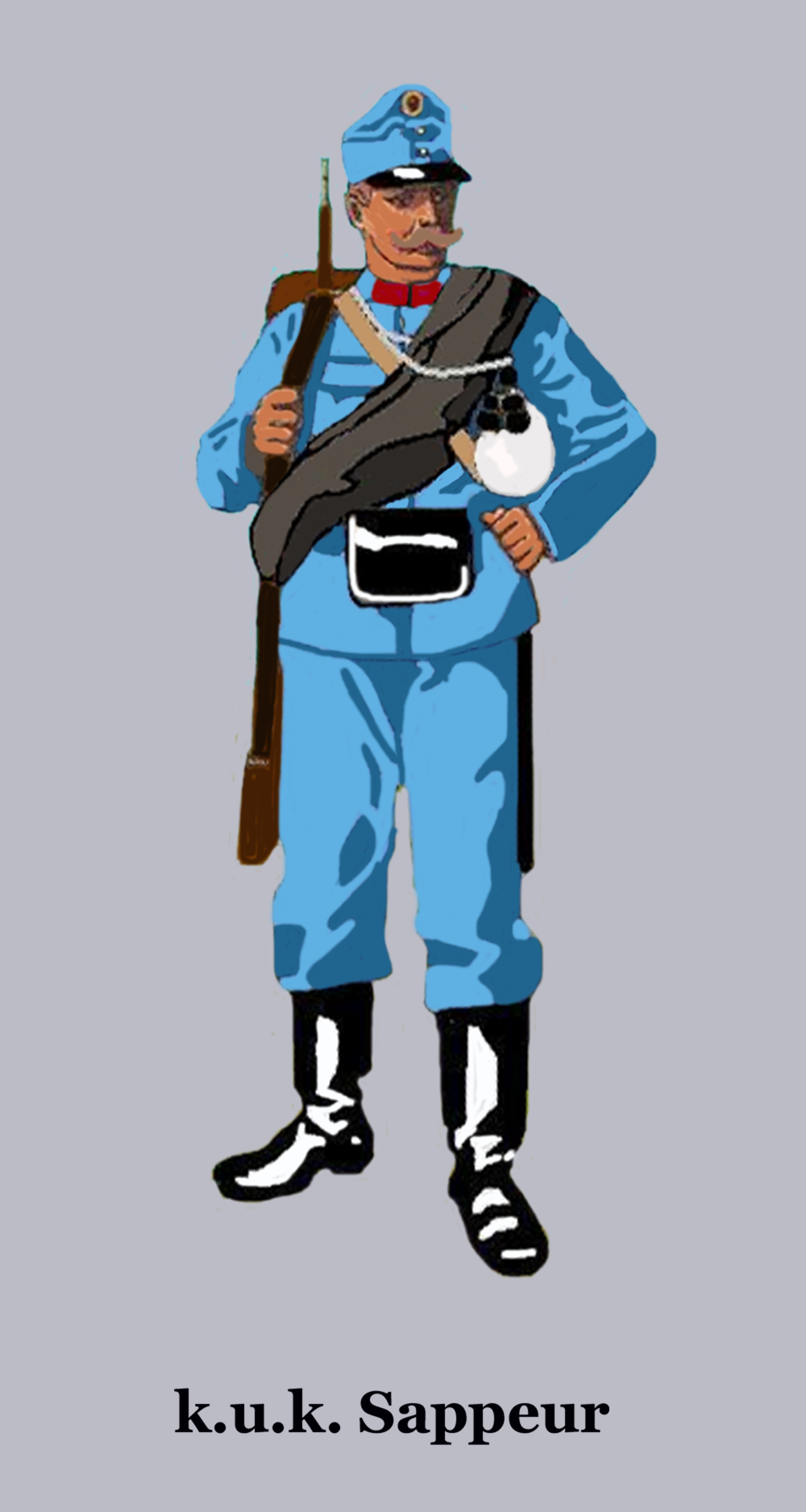
Engineer in battle dress

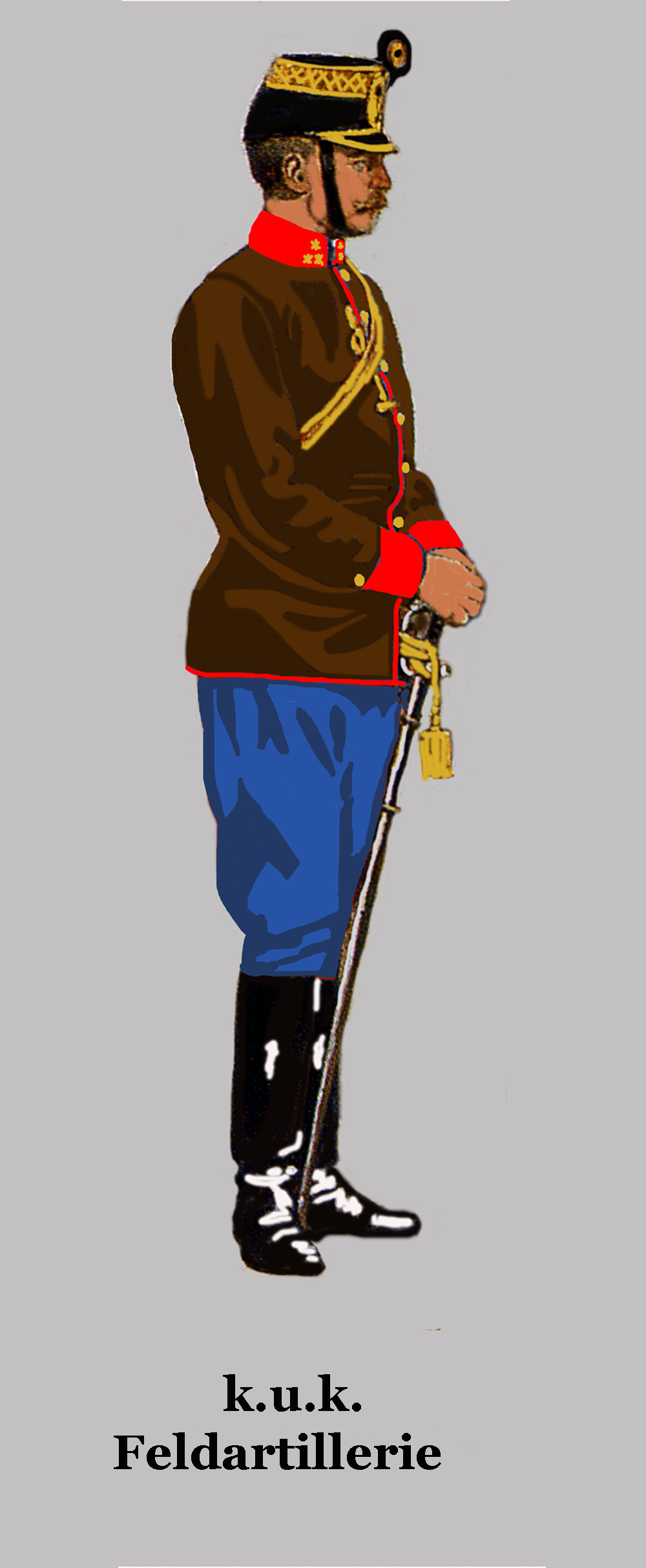
Field artillery officer

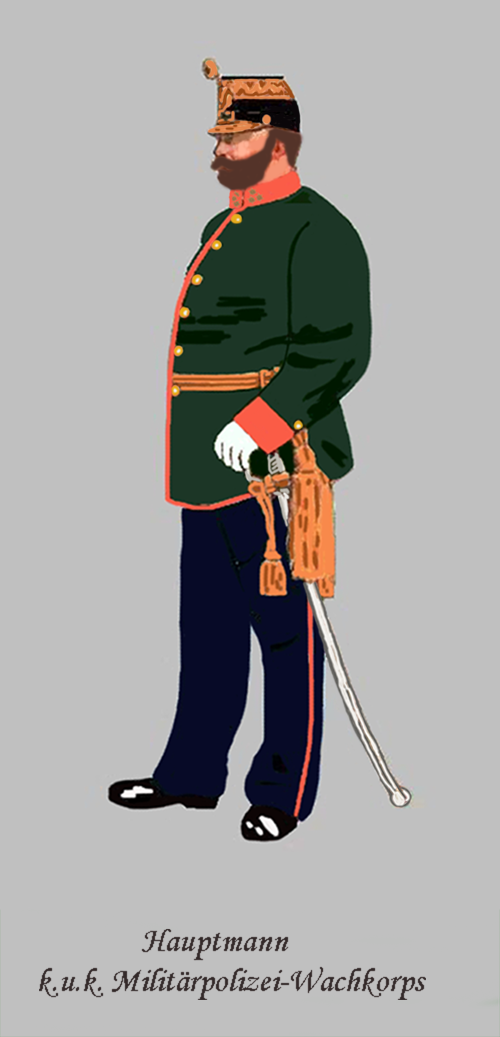
Captain of the Military Police Corps

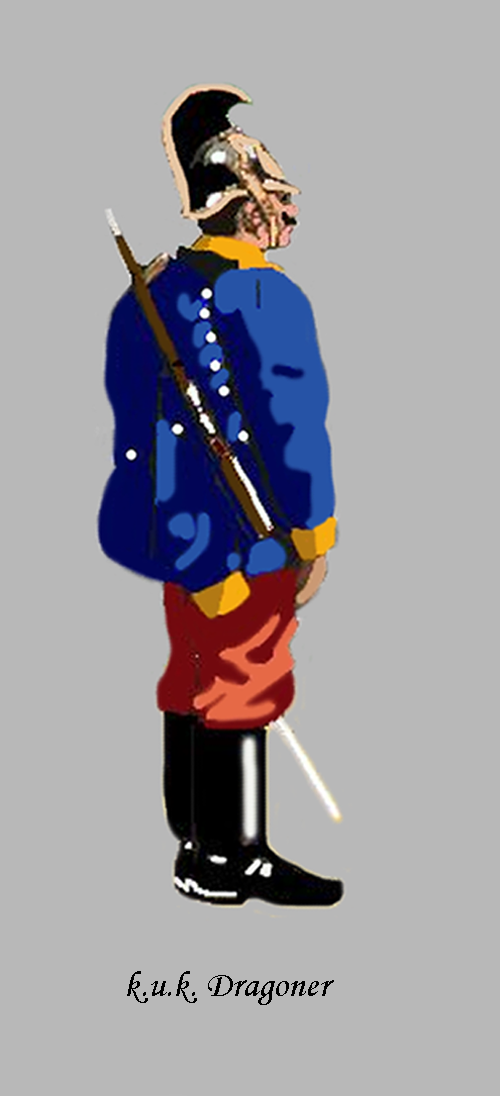
Dragoon (battle dress and parade dress for enlisted men)

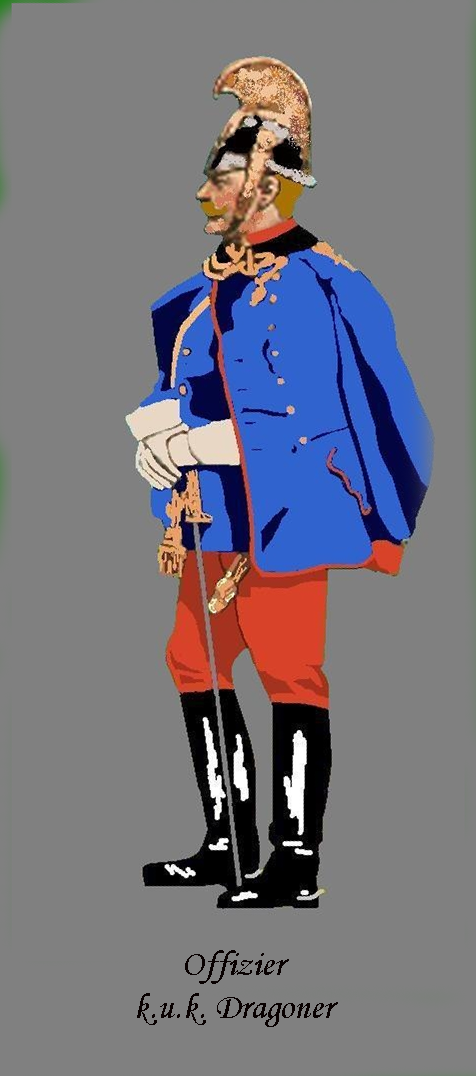
Dragoon officer

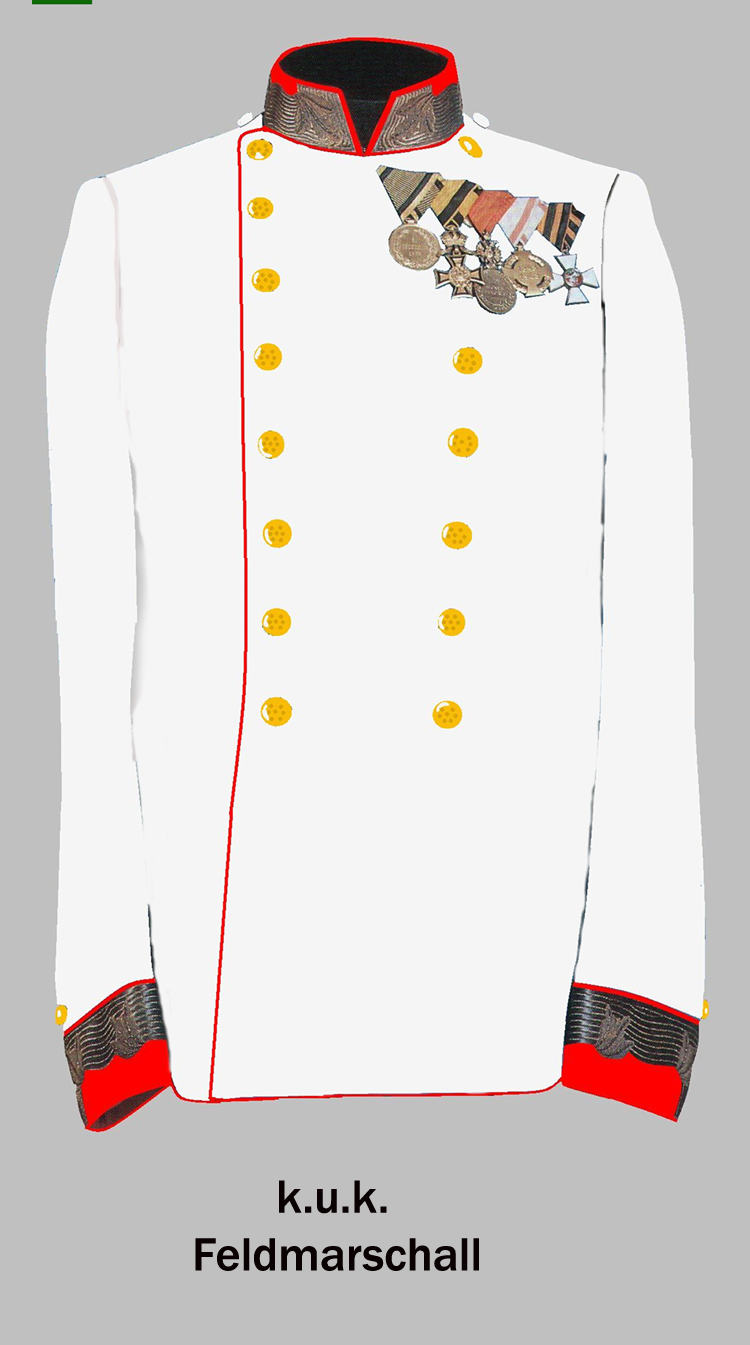
Field Marshal Dress/Gala uniform

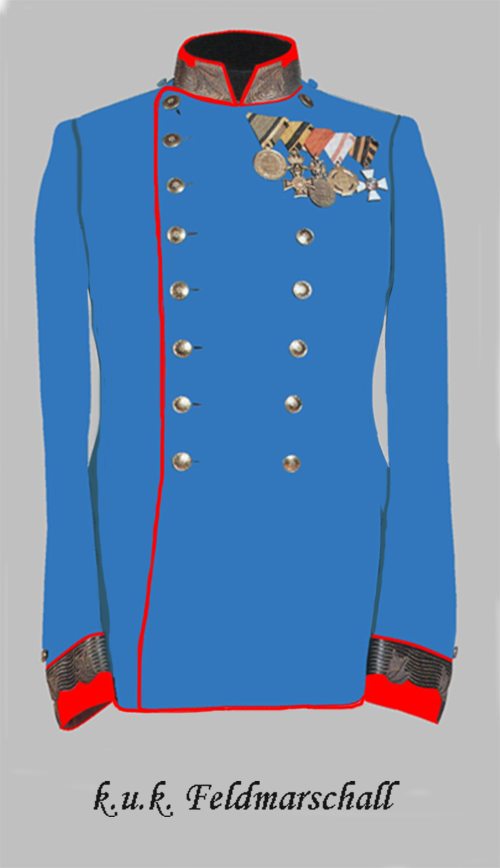
Field Marshal Service uniform, 1918

== See also ==
- Orders, decorations, and medals of Austria-Hungary
- Army Slavic
- Chief of the Military Chancery (Austria-Hungary)
- Grenz infantry
- 1st Army (Austria-Hungary) in World War I
- Schutzkorps
- Imperial and Royal Army during the Napoleonic Wars
- List of Austro-Hungarian colonel generals
- List of Austro-Hungarian field marshals
- Weaponry of the Austro-Hungarian Empire
- The Good Soldier Švejk
