= Rank insignia of the Austro-Hungarian Army =

This article deals with the rank insignia of the Austro-Hungarian Army, as worn by the Austro-Hungarian Army after the reorganisation in 1867 until 1918.

In the Austrian army rank insignia are traditionally called Paroli (pl. Parolis) and are worn as gorget patch or collar tap, appliquéd to the gorget fore-part of the uniform coat, uniform jacket and/or battle-dress.

== Austro-Hungarian Army ==
Paroli (rank insignia) 1867–1918

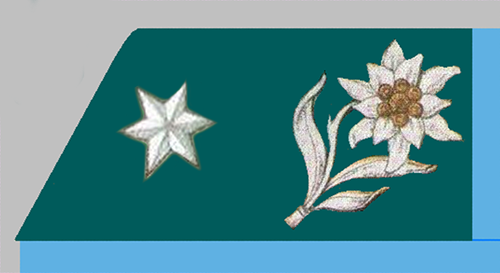
with celluloid distinction star and Edelweiss badge

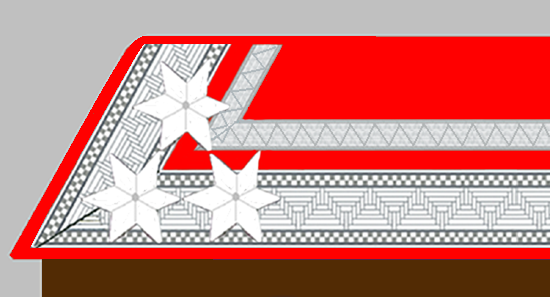
Stabsfeuerwerker with silk distinction stars (1914–18)

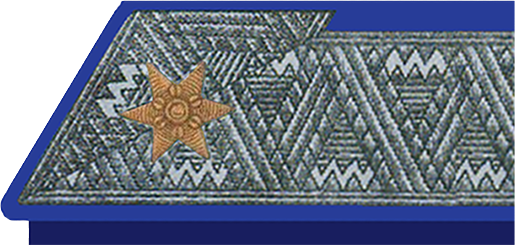
Major with silver galloon

The rank insignia – so-called Paroli – of the Austro-Hungarian Army (1867–1918) were worn on the fore-part of the sleeves for jackets, but never on shoulder straps of shirts, service jackets, and dress uniforms. This extended to the Common Army as well as to the Imperial-Royal Landwehr. However, the mountain corps wore additionally an edelweiss since 1907 behind the distinction star(s).

The rank or distinction stars of enlisted personnel and non-commissioned officers (NCO) were made from white celluloid, those of the ranks Feldwebel and Stabsfeldwebel have been made from white silk since 1914. The rank stars of the junior officer ranks normally consisted of relief metal. Pertaining self procured uniforms, embroidered (from metallic fibre) rank stars might have been selected. The embroidered version was mandatory for staff officer ranks from major (OF3) onwards.

For all other k.k. badges of the Austrian-Hungarian mountain corps from OR1-rank Jäger (en: hunter/ private) to the OF5-rank Oberst (en: colonel)

Even on the field shirts, officer rank stars showed the button-colour of the uniform jacket.

However, staff officers had additionally to wear a galloon on the uniform sleeve. If the galloon colour was silver, the colour of the buttons and the stars had to be golden and vice versa. On the galloon there was a serrated ornament. Generals wore always silver stars on golden galloon. From that derives, that the colour of the rank stars and galloons had nothing to do with the rank.

On coats rank insignias had never been worn. Officers of the so-called Kaiserschützen as well as of the "Landwehr infantry regiments number 4 and 27" (also Mountain infantry regiments 4 and 27) wore on their dress uniforms shoulder straps with the imperator's insignias (not to be mixed up with the particular rank). For any rank description there had to be provided as well an equivalent expression in Hungarian language. Military units, who consisted mainly of Czech, Slovakian, and/ or Polish personal, used unofficially the rank term in their mother language. NCOs were counted to the enlisted personnel, and did not made up a separate rank group.

=== Cadet ===
The Cadet (Kadett), in its position as aspirant to the professional officer career, ranked as well to the enlisted rank group. The cadet ranks counted to the appropriate nominal rank, however, behind the next higher rank. E.g. the "Cadet-gefreiter" was counted for the Gefreiter, however, behind the Corporal, who himself was lower than the "Cadet-corporal".

The characteristic of the cadet ranks was the so-called distinction-galloon on the sleeve ends. It was similar to the feldwebel-galloon, however, from gold colour instead of emperor-yellow. The particular rank was added as well.

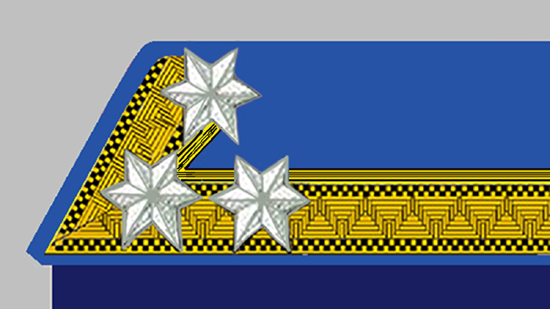
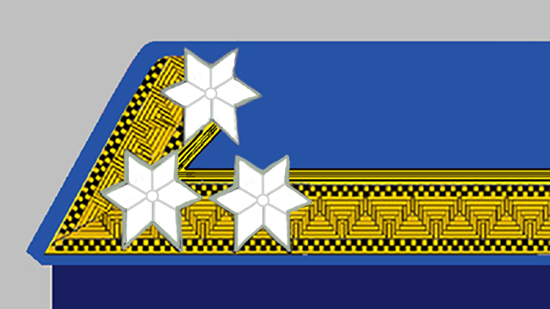
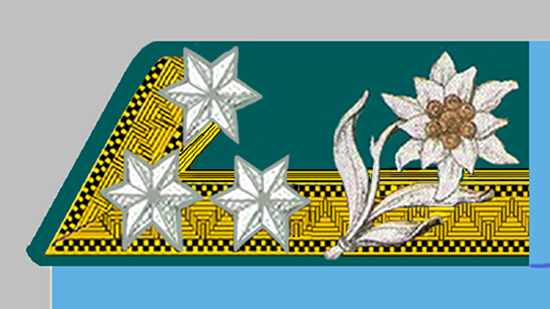
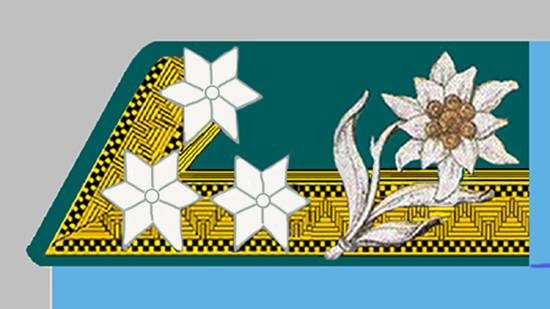
Designation	Performance 1908–1918
Rank insignia collar
Rank description	Kadett (en: Cadet)		Kadett (en: Cadet)
Rank description	1908–1914	1914–1918 (with silk stars)	1908–1914 mountain infantry	1914–1918 (with silk stars)
(Hungarian)	(Hadapród)

=== Stabsfeldwebel ===
The ranks Stabsfeldwebel, Stabsoberjäger, Stabsfeuerwerker and Stabswachtmeister were introduced to the k.u.k. armed forces in 1913. Before it was equivalent to the Bezirksfeldwebel (en: District-Sergeant) of the Gendarmerie (as part of the Landsturm; in Austria Landwehr). To the Feldwebel–uniform the Stabsfeldwebel/Bezirksfeldwebel wore a headgear similar to the officers cap, however, without the characteristic golden officers distinction.

In 1913 the sleeve distinction consisted of a 1.3 cm broad feldwebel-galloon made from imperator-yellow silk. Additionally three white rank celluloid stars were appliquéd. In June 1913 the rank insignia was changed. The galloon was now silver designed, and the rank stars were made from white silk and embroidered.

In 1915 the ranks Stabsfeldwebel/Stabswachtmeister und Offiziersstellvertreter (en: officer deputy) were summarised to the new rank group higher/ senior NCOs (höhere Unteroffiziere).

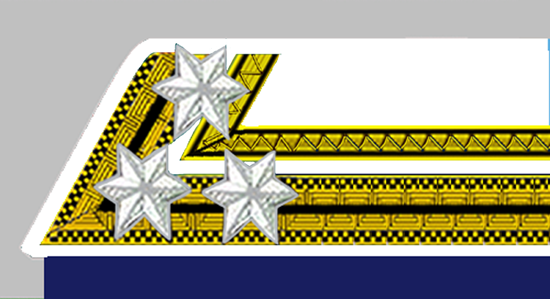
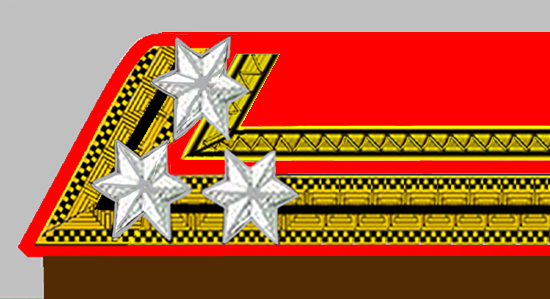
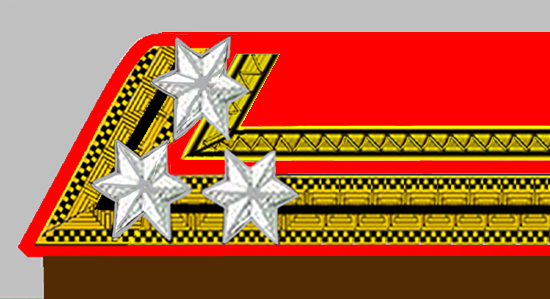
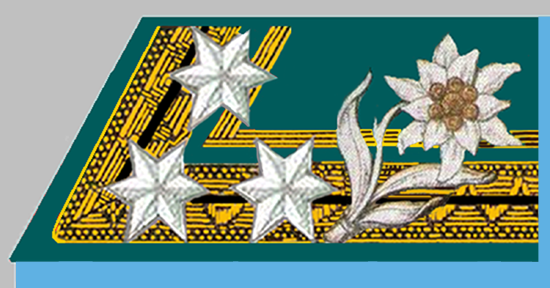
Designation	Performance 1913–1914
Rank insignia collar
Rank description	Stabsfeldwebel	Stabsfeuerwerker; Artillery	Stabswachtmeister; Dragoon	Stabsoberjaeger; Mountain infantry
(Hungarian)	(Törzsőrmester)

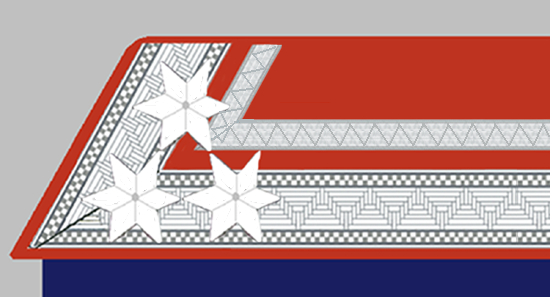
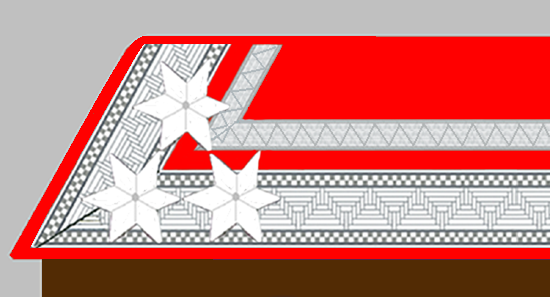
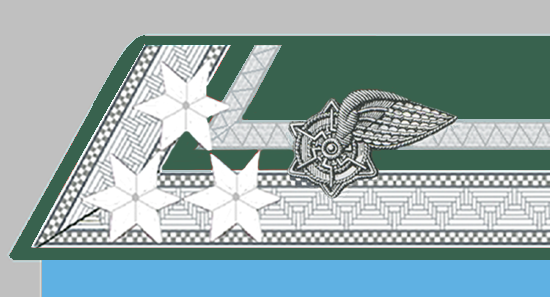
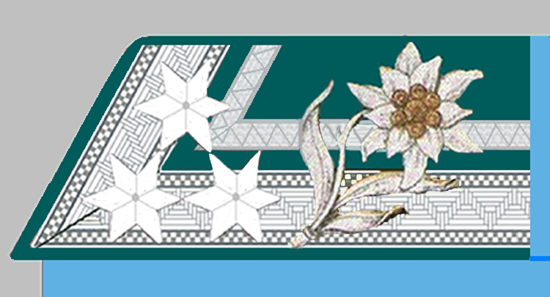
Designation	Performance 1914–1918
Rank insignia collar
Rank description	Stabsfeldwebel; Stabswachtmeister	Stabsfeuerwerker; Artillery	Stabsfeldwebel; Railway regiment	Stabsoberjaeger; Mountain infantry
(Hungarian)	(Törzsőrmester)

=== One-year volunteer ===
The officer aspirant (Offizieranwaerter (OA)/ Tisztjelölt) of the reserve undertook military training as a One-year volunteer (Einjaehrig-Freiwilliger (EF)/ Egyévi Önkéntesi). The distinguishing badge was an imperator-yellow silk square-galloon on the upper part of the cuff. In 1915 the galloon was removed after passing the final examination. It was replaced by the so-called bright "EF-button" to be worn on the collar. The EF-button was fixed behind the nominal rank stars, and was removed on promotion to first officer grade.

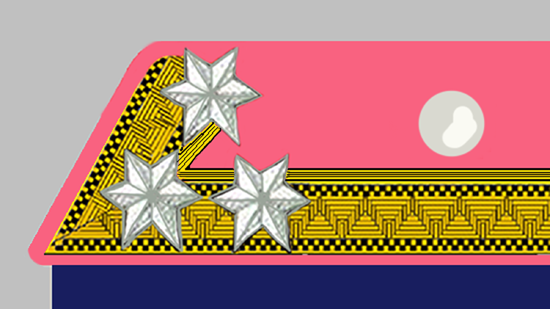
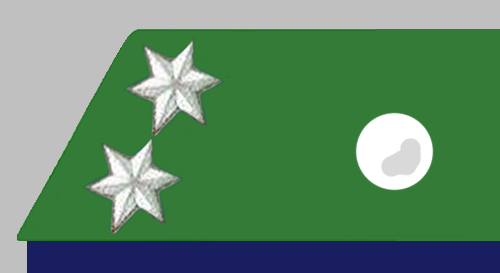
Designation	One-year volunteer with EF-button
Rank insignia collar
Rank description	Cadet; One-year volunteer	Corporal; One-year volunteer
(German)	(Kadett EF)	(Korporal EF)

=== Ensign ===
The rank "Cadet officer-deputy" (Kadett-Offiziersstellvertreter) was renamed to Ensign (Fähnrich) in 1908. The service insignia was a map case, made from black coloured leather, and to be worn on the waist belt. More characteristics were the black officer's cap, however with imperator-yellow side ornament (instead from gold). The white celluloid star was replaced by a silver coloured star. Also in this year, the old term (rank) "Kadett-Feldwebel" was replaced by the new one Cadet (Kadett / Hadapród).

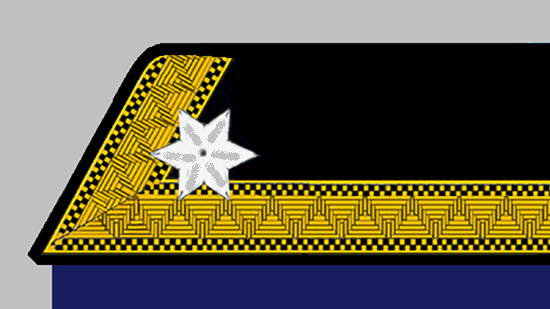
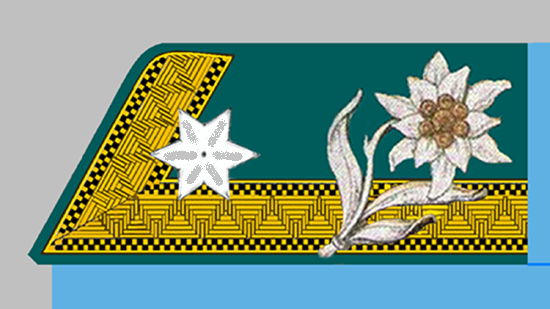
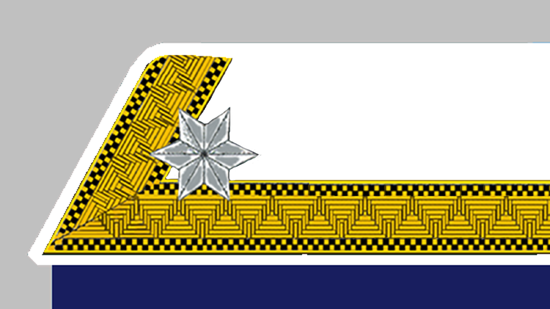
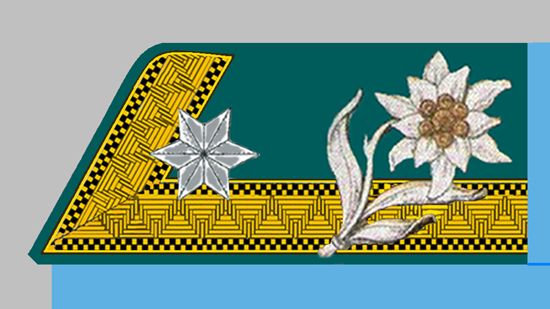
Designation	Cadet officer-deputy until 1908	Ensign 1908–1918
Rank insignia collar
Rank description	Kadett-Offizierstellvertreter	Fähnrich
(Hungarian)	(Hadapród-Tiszthelyettes)	(Zászlós)

=== Shako ===
In addition to the gorget rank insignias, the so-called distinction, the individual rank was indicated by the yellow distinction-galloon on the parade headgear, called shako (Tschako, Csákó) a special version of helmet.

- Gefreiter: Was to be identified with a yellow, black-carved 0.5 Austrian inch (~0.5 cm) thick round cord
- Corporal: Wore a 1.5 Austrian inch (~4 cm) broad the yellow distinction-galloon (with zigzag trim ornament)
- Zugsführer, Wachtmeister, and Cadet officer-deputy (Ensign): As to the corporal, however, concentric divided by a 1/24 Austrian inch (~1 mm) small black stripe

The distinction galloons and pipings for enlisted ranks and NCOs were made from yellow sheep's wool, for Ensigns since 1908 from yellow silk, and for officers from gold yarn. Pertaining private procured special editions to enlisted ranks and NCOs, silk trims have been allowed as well.

The Waffenfarbe (en: corps colour) had to be in correlation to the appropriate military unit, branch, or branch of service.

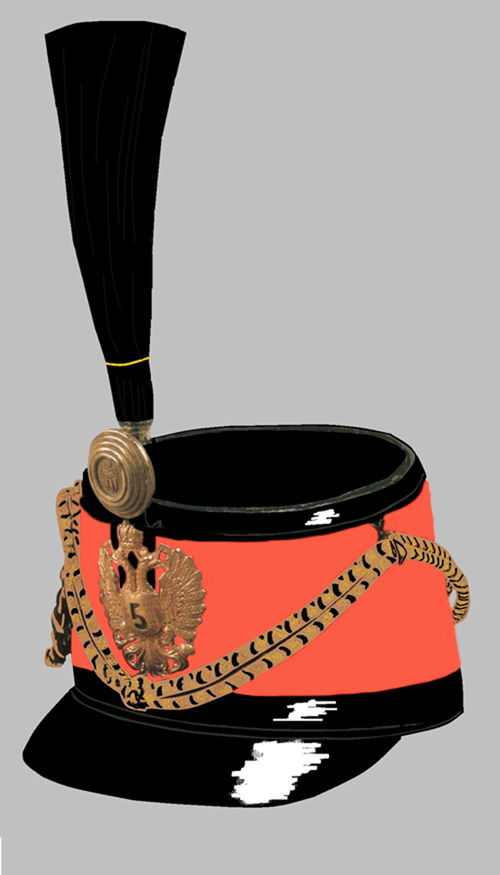
k.u.k. Hussars
(brick-red corps colour)

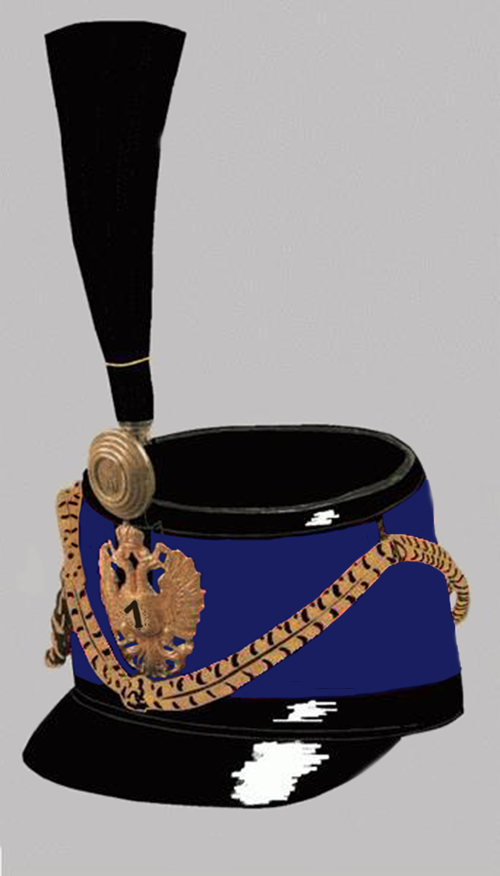
k.u.k. Hussars
(dark-blue corps colour)

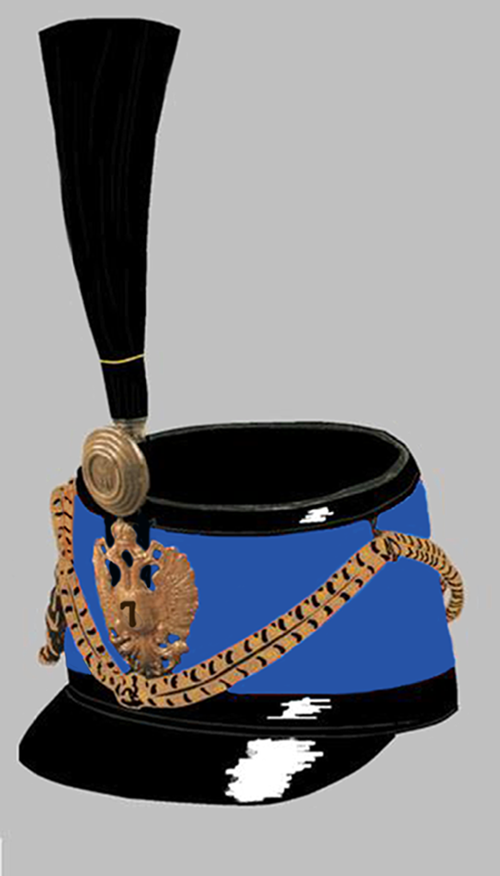
k.u.k. Hussars
(light-blue corps colour)

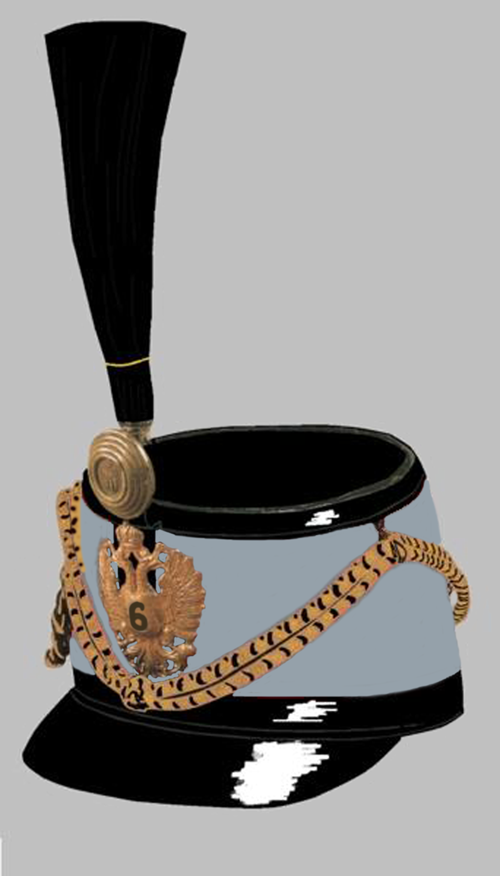
k.u.k. Hussars
(ash-grey corps colour)

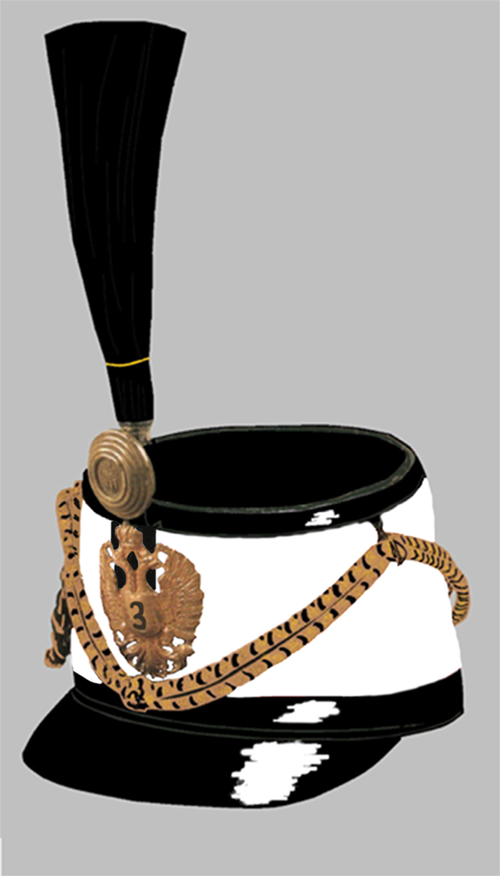
k.u.k. Hussars
(white corps colour)

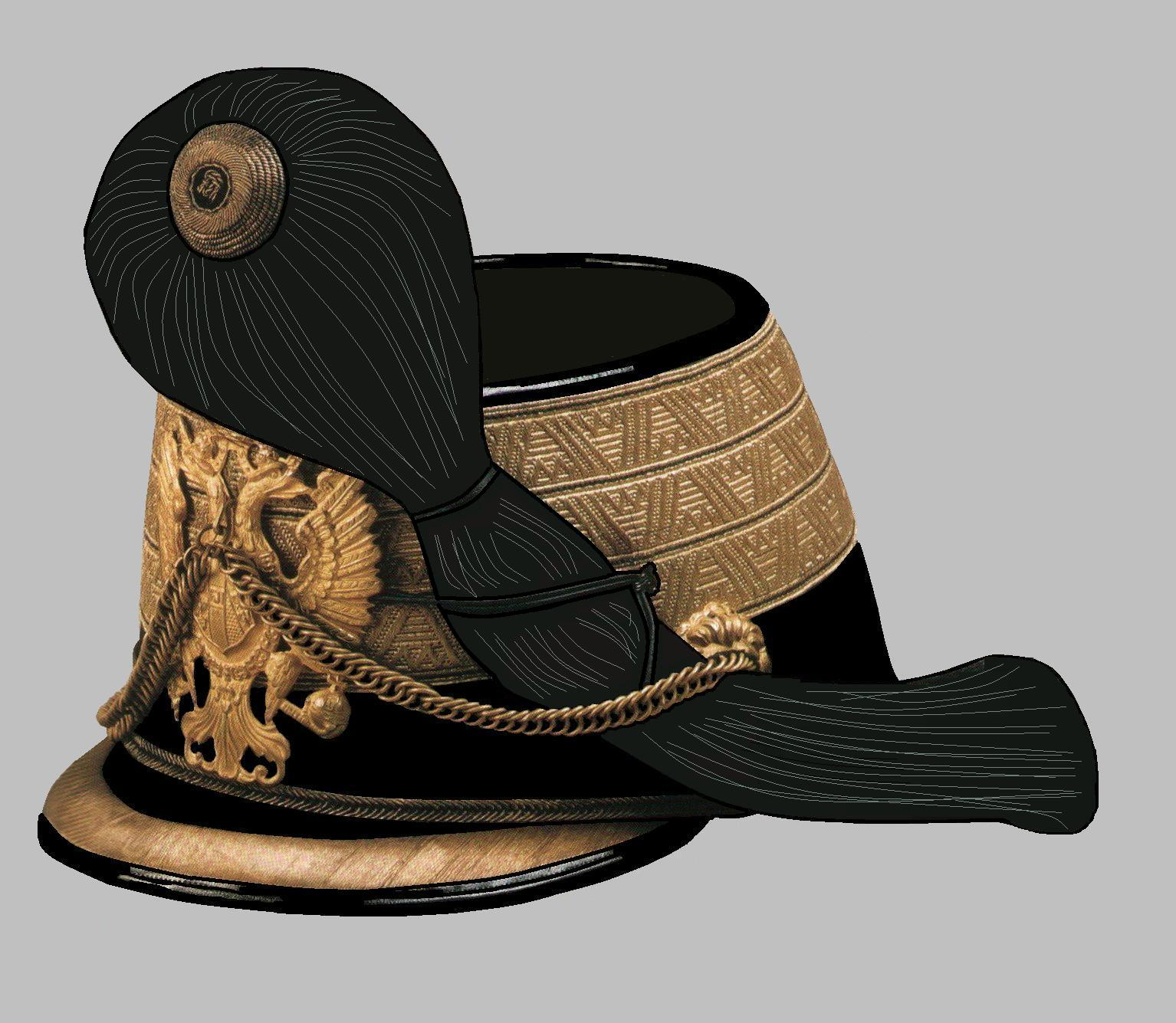
k.u.k Artillery
(black corps colour)

=== Enlisted men, NCOs, officer aspirants, and officer-deputies ===
(RK means the Rangklasse (Rank classification. As the k.u.k. Army was never a member of NATO, it did not use NATO Rank Codes)

Grade	Rank in German / Hungarian, equivalent in English	Rank insignia	
Grade	Rank in German / Hungarian, equivalent in English	example	description
Gemeine	Infanterist / Honvéd | Jäger | Dragoner | Ulan | Husar | Kanonier | Pionier | Trainsoldat | Sanitätssoldat		without rank insignia
Gemeine	Infantryman | Rifleman | Dragoon | Uhlan | Hussar | Gunner | Engineer | Trainmen | Medical		without rank insignia
Charges	Gefreiter / Őrvezető | Vormeister | Patrouilleführer		1 white star
Charges	Private 1st class | Gunner 1st class | Rifleman 1st class		1 white star
Charges	Korporal / Tizedes | Geschütz-Vormeister | Gewehr-Vormeister | Unterjäger | Bataillonstambour | Waffenmeister 3. Klasse | Bataillonshornist		2 white stars
Charges	Corporal | Gunner-Corporal | Machinegun-Corporal | Rifles-Corporal | Battalion drummer | Weapon master 3rd class | Battalion bugler		2 white stars
Charges	Zugsführer / Szakaszvezető | Kurschmied | Rechnungs-Unteroffizier 2. Klasse | Waffenmeister 2. Klasse		3 white stars
Charges	Sergeant - Sgt) | Stabsführer | Fiscal Sergeant 2nd class | Weapon master 2nd class		3 white stars
no RK	Feldwebel / Őrmester | Wachtmeister | Feuerwerker | Oberjäger | Rechnungs-Unteroffizier I. Klasse | Waffenmeister I. Klasse | Beschlagmeister I. Klasse | Regimentstambour | Regimentshornist | Einjährig-Freiwilliger-Feldwebel | Kadett-Feldwebel (only until 1908)		3 white stars, 13mm yellow silk galloon
no RK	Master-sergeant | Cavalry master-sergeant | Artillery master-sergeant | Rifles master-sergeant | Fiscal Sergeant 1st class | Weapon master 1st class | Master-Blacksmith 1st class | Regiment drummer | Regiment bugler | Feldwebel - volunteer serving one year | Kadet-Feldwebel		3 white stars, 13mm yellow silk galloon
no RK	Stabsfeldwebel / Törzsőrmester | Stabswachtmeister | Stabsfeuerwerker | Stabsoberjäger		3 white stars, 13mm imperial-yellow silk galloon with 2mm broad black middle strap, 3mm above a 6mm braiding; since June 1914: silver galloon with silk stars
no RK	1st Sergeant | Cavalry 1st sergeant | Artillery 1st sergeant | Rifles 1st sergeant		3 white stars, 13mm imperial-yellow silk galloon with 2mm broad black middle strap, 3mm above a 6mm braiding; since June 1914: silver galloon with silk stars
no RK	Kadett-Offiziersstellvertreter / Hadapród-Tiszthelyettes, cancelled in 1908		Golden galloon as to Feldwebel with 1 silver-plated star
no RK	Cadet-officer-deputy		Golden galloon as to Feldwebel with 1 silver-plated star
no RK	Kadett / Hadapród established in 1908		3 white stars on 13mm gold galloon; since June 1914: 3 stars from white silk on 13mm gold galloon
no RK	Cadet		3 white stars on 13mm gold galloon; since June 1914: 3 stars from white silk on 13mm gold galloon
no RK	Offiziersstellvertreter / Tiszthelyettes since 1915		one 13mm silver galloon, above one 6mm galloon with one brass star
no RK	Officer deputy		one 13mm silver galloon, above one 6mm galloon with one brass star
no RK	Fähnrich / Zászlós		1 silver star on 13mm on 13mm gold galloon
no RK	Ensign		1 silver star on 13mm on 13mm gold galloon

== Officers and officials ==
Grade	Rank in German - Hungarian, equivalent in English	Rank insignia
RK XII	Praktikant (N.N.)	1 rosette with 13mm gold galloon
RK XII	Trainee	1 rosette with 13mm gold galloon
RK XI	Untertierarzt / Akzessist / Assistent / Lehrer 2. Klasse / Fechtmeister 2. Klasse / Wirtschaftsadjunkt	1 gold/silver embroidered star rosette
RK XI	Veterinarian junior grade/ Accessist / Assistant (civilian army branch)/ Teacher 2nd class (civilian army branch)/ Fencing-master 2nd class / Economy adjunct (civilian army branch)	1 gold/silver embroidered star rosette
RK XI	Leutnant - Hadnagy / Assistenz-Arzt / Leutnant-Rechnungsführer	1 gold/silver embroidered star
RK XI	Lieutenant / Assistant medical doctor / Fiscal lieutenant	1 gold/silver embroidered star
RK XI	Tierärztlicher Assistent / Tierarzt / Apotheker / Offizial / Lehrer 1. Klasse / Fechtmeister 1. Klasse / Wirtschaftsunterverwalter / Kriegswirtschaftskommissär	2 gold/silver embroidered star rosettes
RK XI	Veterinarian assistant / Veterinarian / Pharmacist / Official (civilian army branch)/ Teacher 1st class (civilian army branch)/ Fencing instructor 1st class / Economy manager junior grade (civilian army branch)/ War economy commissioner (civilian army branch)	2 gold/silver embroidered star rosettes
RK X	Artillerieingenieur-Assistent / Militär-Bauingenieur-Assistent	2 gold/silver embroidered stars
RK X	Artillery assistant engineer / Military construction engineer assistant	2 gold/silver embroidered stars
RK X	Oberleutnant - Főhadnagy / Oberarzt / Oberleutnant-Auditor / Oberleutnant-Rechnungsführer	2 gold/silver embroidered stars
RK X	First Lieutenant / Assistant medical director / Auditor first lieutenant / Fiscal first lieutenant	2 gold/silver embroidered stars
RK IX	Tierärztliche Adjunkt / Obertierarzt / Oberapotheker / Oberoffizial / Oberlehrer / Oberfechtmeister / Wirtschaftsverwalter / Kriegswirtschafts-Oberkommissär / Forstverwalter	3 gold/silver embroidered star rosettes
RK IX	Veterinarian adjunct / Veterinarian senior grade/ Pharmacist senior grade/ Official senior grade (civilian army branch) / Teacher senior grade/ Fencing-instructor senior grade / Economy manager (civilian army branch)/ War economy first commissioner (civilian army branch)/ Forest-administrator (civilian army branch)	3 gold/silver embroidered star rosettes
RK IX	Sekretär der Militärkanzlei Sr. Majestät / Unterintendant / Artillerie-Ingenieur / Militär-Bauingenieur	3 gold/silver embroidered stars
RK IX	Secretary of the military office of His Majesty / Director junior grade/ Artillery engineer / Military construction engineer	3 gold/silver embroidered stars
RK IX	Hauptmann - Százados / Rittmeister / Regimentsarzt / Hauptmann-Auditor / Hauptmann-Rechnungsführer	3 gold/silver embroidered stars
RK IX	Captain / Captain cavalery / Regimental medical doctor / Captain auditor / Fiscal Captain	3 gold/silver embroidered stars
RK VIII	Stabsarzt / Stabstierarzt / Stabsapotheker / Technischer Rat / Rechnungsrat / Zahlmeister / Registrator / Artilleriezeugsverwalter / Verpflegsverwalter / Oberlehrer / Wirtschaftsoberverwalter / Kriegswirtschafts-Rat	1 gold/silver embroidered star rosette on 33mm gold/silver galloon
RK VIII	Veterinarian senior grade/ Pharmacist senior grade / Technical consultant (civilian army branch)/ Financing consultant (civilian army branch)/ Paymaster / Registry official / Artillery supply administrator / Food administrator / Senior teacher / Senior economy administrator / War economy consultant	1 gold/silver embroidered star rosette on 33mm gold/silver galloon
RK VIII	Sekretär der Militärkanzlei Sr. Majestät / Intendant / Artillerie-Oberingenieur 3. Klasse / Militär-Bauoberingenieur 3. Klasse	1 gold/silver embroidered star on 33mm gold/silver galloon
RK VIII	Secretary of the military office of His Majesty / Intendant / Senior artillery engineer 3rd class / Military construction engineer 3rd class	1 gold/silver embroidered star on 33mm gold/silver galloon
RK VIII	Major - Őrnagy / Stabsarzt / Major-Auditor	1 gold/silver embroidered star on 33mm gold/silver galloon
RK VIII	Major / Surgeon / Major auditor	1 gold/silver embroidered star on 33mm gold/silver galloon
RK VII	Außerordentlicher Professor / Oberstabstierarzt / Oberstabsapotheker 2. Klasse / Technischer Oberrat / Artillerie-Oberzeugsverwalter 2. Klasse / Oberrechnungsrat 2. Klasse / Kassendirektor 2. Klasse / Oberverpflegsverwalter / Registratur-Unterdirektor / Wirtschaftsdirektor / Kriegwirtschafts-Oberrat 2. Klasse	2 gold/silver embroidered star rosettes on 33mm gold/silver galloon
RK VII	Extraordinary professor (civilian army branch)/ Major veterinarian / Major pharmacist 2nd class / Senior technical adviser / Senior artillery supply administrator 2nd class (civilian army branch)/ Senior financing consultant 2nd class (civilian army branch)/ Cashier's office director 2nd class / Senior food administrator / Registry official director junior grade/ Economy director / Senior war economy consultant 2nd class	2 gold/silver embroidered star rosettes on 33mm gold/silver galloon
RK VII	Hofsekretär der Militärkanzlei Sr. Majestät / Sekretär der Militärkanzlei Sr. Majestät / Oberintendant 2. Klasse / Artillerie-Oberingenieur 2. Klasse / Militär-Bauoberingenieur 2. Klasse	2 gold/silver embroidered stars on 33mm gold/silver galloon
RK VII	Court-secretary of the military office of His Majesty / Secretary of the military office of His Majesty / Senior director 2nd class / Senior artillery director 2nd class / Senior military construction engineer 2nd class	2 gold/silver embroidered stars on 33mm gold/silver galloon
RK VII	Oberstleutnant - Alezredes	2 gold/silver embroidered stars on 33mm gold/silver galloon
RK VII	Lieutenant colonel	2 gold/silver embroidered stars on 33mm gold/silver galloon
RK VI	Ordentlicher Professor / Oberstabsapotheker 1. Klasse / Technischer Rat 1. Klasse / Technischer Oberrat 1. Klasse / Artillerie-Oberzeugsverwalter 1. Klasse / Oberrechnungsrat 1. Klasse / Registratur-Direktor / Kassendirektor 1. Klasse / Baurechnungsrat 1. Klasse / Kriegswirtschafts-Oberrat 1. Klasse	3 gold/silver embroidered stars rosettes on 33mm gold/silver galloon
RK VI	Ordinary professor (civilian army branch) / Major pharmacist 1st class / Technical adviser 1st class / Senior technical adviser 1st class /Senior artillery supply administrator 1st class (civilian army branch)/ Senior financing consultant 1st class (civilian army branch)/ Registry director (civilian army branch)/ Cashier's office director 1st class / Senior war economy consultant 1st class (civilian army branch)	3 gold/silver embroidered stars rosettes on 33mm gold/silver galloon
RK VI	Sektionsrat der Militärkanzlei Sr. Majestät / Regierungsrat der Militärkanzlei Sr. Majestät / Oberintendant 1. Klasse / Artillerie-Oberingenieur 1. Klasse / Militär-Bauoberingenieur 1. Klasse	3 gold/silver embroidered stars on 33mm gold/silver galloon
RK VI	Section-consultant of the military office of His Majesty / Senior administrative officer of the military office of His Majesty / Senior director 1st class / Senior artillery engineer 1st class / Senior military construction engineer 1st class	3 gold/silver embroidered stars on 33mm gold/silver galloon
RK VI	Oberst - Ezredes / Oberstabsarzt 1. Klasse / Oberst-Auditor	3 gold/silver embroidered stars on 33mm gold/silver galloon
RK VI	Colonel	3 gold/silver embroidered stars on 33mm gold/silver galloon
RK V	Hofrat der Militärkanzlei Sr. Majestät / Generalintendant / Artillerie-Generalingenieur / General-Bauingenieur / Hofrat der Mil. Tierärztlichen Hochschule / Ministerialrat / Kriegwirtschafts-Generalrat	1 silver embroidered star on 33mm gold galloon
RK V	Court-consultant of the military chancellery office of His Majesty / General-indendant / Artillery general-engineer / Construction general-engineer / Court-consultant of the veterinarian high school / Superior counsellor in a ministerial department / War economy director-general	1 silver embroidered star on 33mm gold galloon
RK V	Generalmajor - Vezérőrnagy / Generalstabsarzt / General-Auditor	1 silver embroidered star on 33mm gold galloon
RK V	Brigadier-general	1 silver embroidered star on 33mm gold galloon
RK IV	Sektionschef	2 silver embroidered stars on 33mm gold galloon
RK IV	Section chief	2 silver embroidered stars on 33mm gold galloon
RK IV	Feldmarschall-Leutnant - Altábornagy / General-Oberstabsarzt; General-Chefauditor	2 silver embroidered stars on 33mm gold galloon
RK IV	Major-general / General-Chief Surgeon; General-Chiefauditor	2 silver embroidered stars on 33mm gold galloon
RK III	General der Infanterie - Gyalogsági Tábornok; General der Kavallerie - Lovassági Tábornok; Feldzeugmeister - Táborszernagy	3 silver embroidered stars on 33mm gold galloon
RK III	General of the Infantry; General of the Cavalry; General of the Artillery	3 silver embroidered stars on 33mm gold galloon
RK II	Generaloberst - Vezérezredes since 1915	3 silver embroidered stars, underlaid by a 40mm silver embroidery wreath on 33mm gold galloon
RK II	Colonel-general	3 silver embroidered stars, underlaid by a 40mm silver embroidery wreath on 33mm gold galloon
RK I	Feldmarschall - Tábornagy	33mm gold embroidery with oak leaves directed below
RK I	Field-Marshal	33mm gold embroidery with oak leaves directed below

== Members of the military personal status ==
=== Enlisted men ===
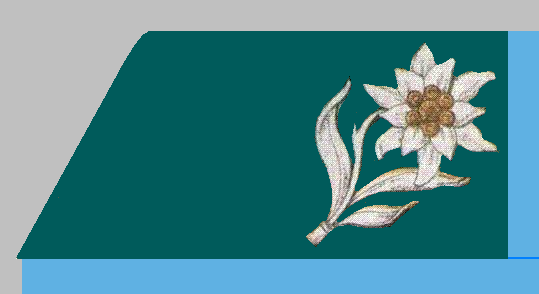
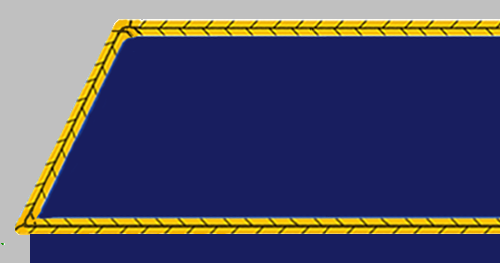
Designation	Enlisted/Private ranks
Rank insignia
Rank description	Infanterist	Jäger	Dragoner	Ulan	Husar	Kanonier	Pionier	Trainsoldat	Sanitätssoldat
Branch	Infantry	Mountain infantry	Cavalry			Artillery	Military engineering	Supply	Medical corps
(English)	(Infantry man)	(Jäger)	(Dragoon)	(Lancer)	(Hussar)	(Gunner)	(Engineer)	(Private)	(Medical)

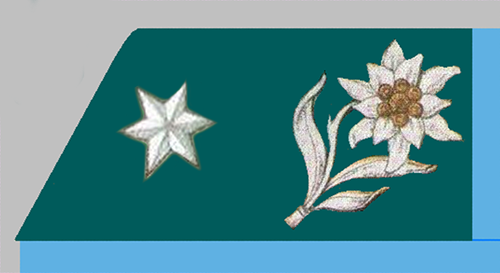
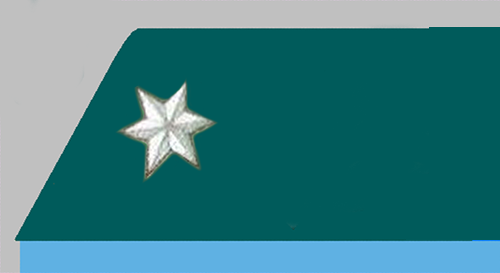
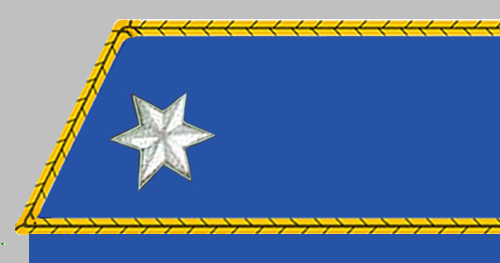
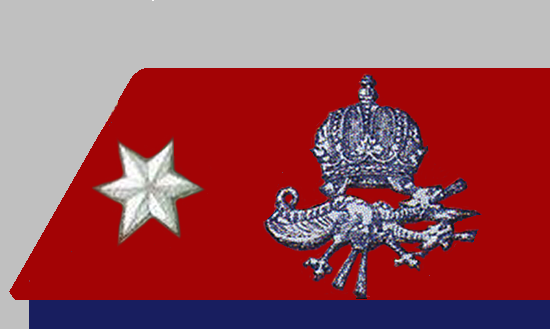
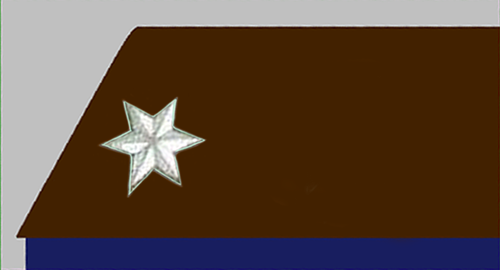
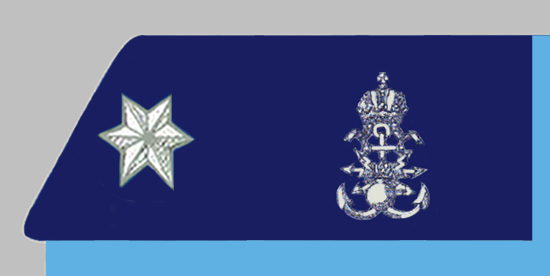
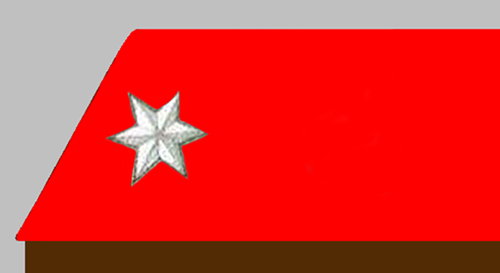
Designation	Enlisted/Lance-corporal ranks
Rank insignia
Rank description	Patrouilleführer			Gefreiter			Vormeister
	k.k. Mountain troops	k.u.k. Rifles		Machine-gun units	Infantry generic
branch	Rifles		Cavalry	Infantry		Military engineering	Artillery
(equivalent)	(Rifle 1st class)		(Private 1st class)				(Gunner 1st class)

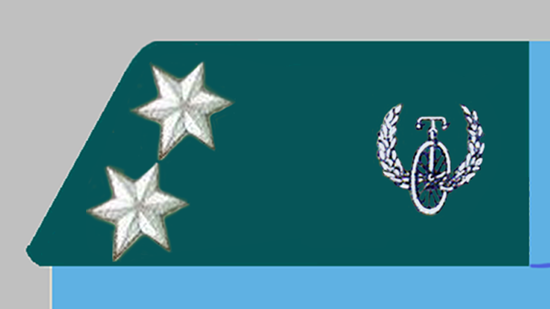
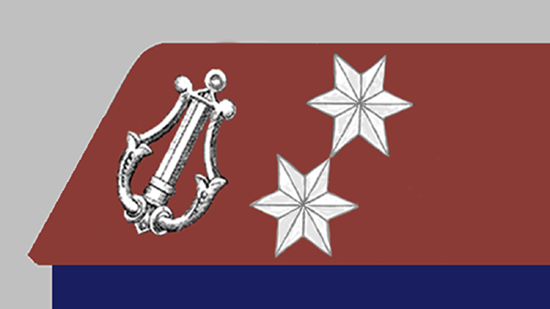
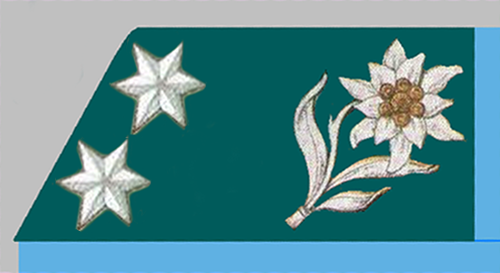
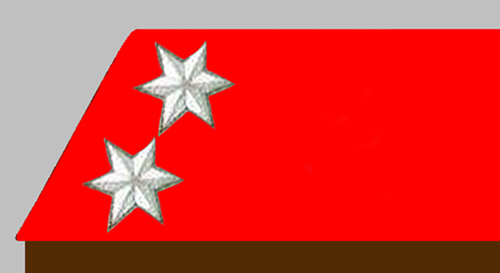
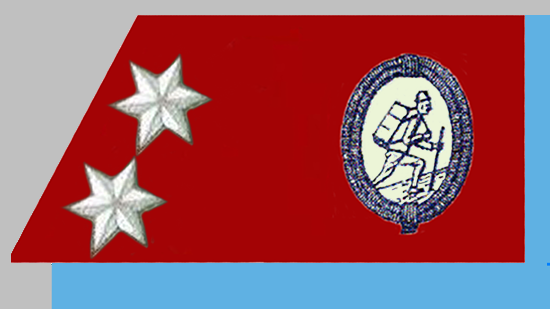
Designation	Enlisted / Corporal ranks
Rank insignia
Rank description	Korporal k.u.k. Radfahrtruppe	Korporal k.u.k. Regimentsmusik	Unterjäger	Korporal	Geschütz-Vormeister	Korporal	Korporal	Korporal
Branch	Infantry		Mountain infantry	Cavalry	Artillery	Military engineering	Supply	Medical corps
(English)	(Cpl k.u.k. cyclistes)	(Regimental musician corporal)	(Mountain infantry corporal)	(Corporal)	(Corporal)	(Gunner-corporal)	(Corporal)	(Corporal porter unit)	(Corporal)

=== NCO ranks ===
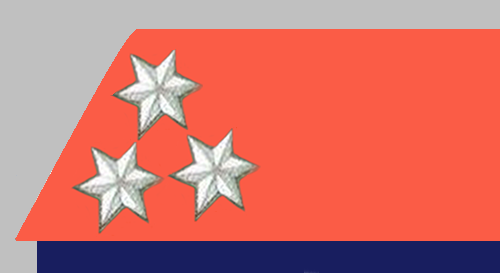
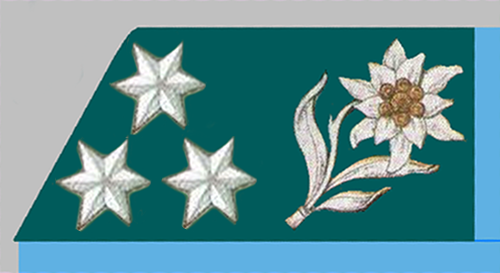
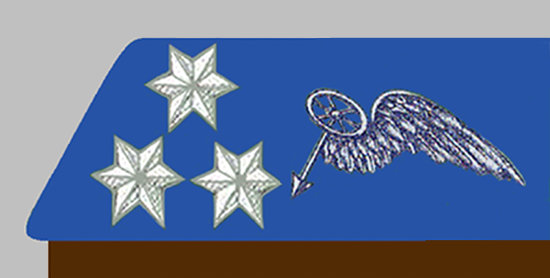
Designation	Enlisted / Sergeant ranks
Rank insignia
Rank description	Zugsführer	Rechnungs- Unteroffizier; 2. Klasse	Zugsführer	Zugsführer	Kurschmied	Waffenmeister; 2. Klasse	Zugsführer	Zugsführer (Kraftfahrtruppe)	Zugsführer (Sanitätstruppe)
Branch	Infantry		Mountain infantry	Cavalry		Artillery	Military engineering	Supply	Medical corps
(English)	(Zugsführer)	(Viscal NCO; 2nd class)	(Zgf)	(Zgf cavalry)	(Blacksmith)	(Ordnance Sergeant; 2nd class)	(Zgf mil. engineering)	(Zgf vehicle troops)	(Zgf medical corps)

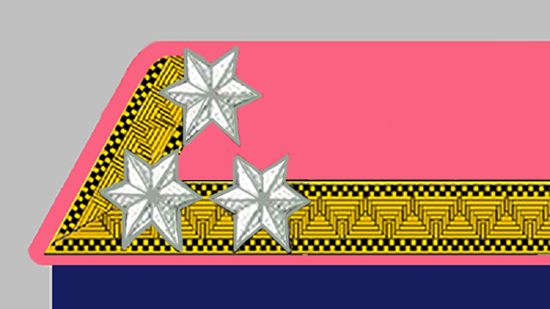
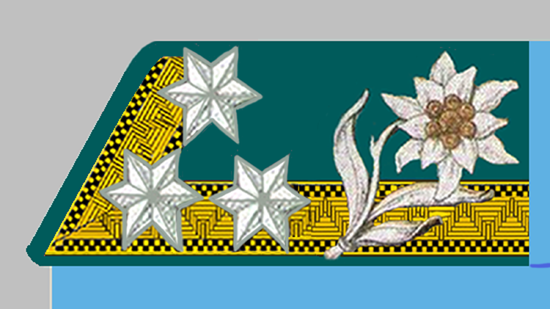
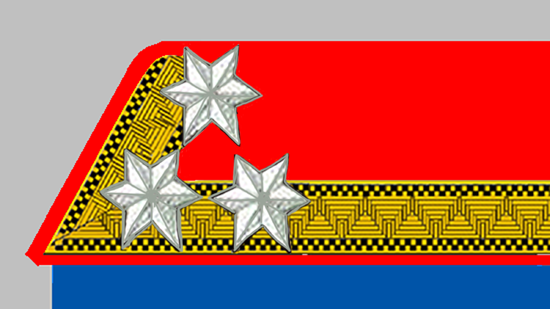
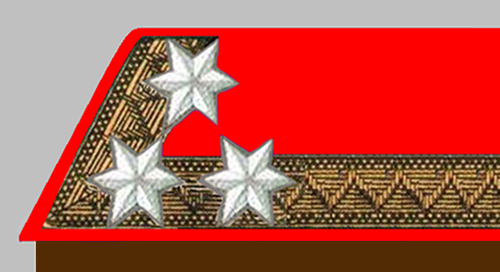
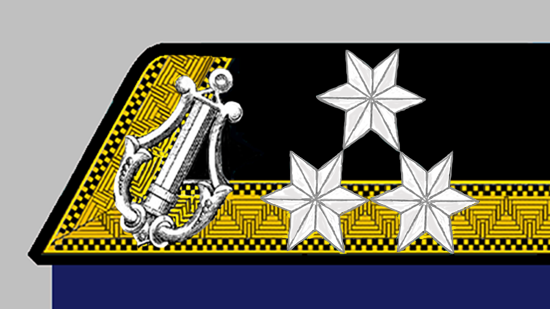
Designation	Feldwebel / Master Sergeant ranks
Rank insignia
Rank description	Feldwebel	Kadett-Feldwebel	Oberjäger	Kadett-Oberjäger	Wachtmeister	Kadett-Wachtmeister	Feuerwerker	Kadett-Feuerwerker	Stabführer(Musikkorps)
Branch	Infantry		Mountain infantry		Cavalry		Artillery		Military band
(English)	(Master-sergeantl)	(Cadet master-sergeant)	(Rifles master-sergeant)	(Cadet master-sergeant )	(Cavalry sergeant)	(Cadet master-sergeant)	(Artillery master-sergeant)	(Cadet master-sergeant)	(Tambour-Major)

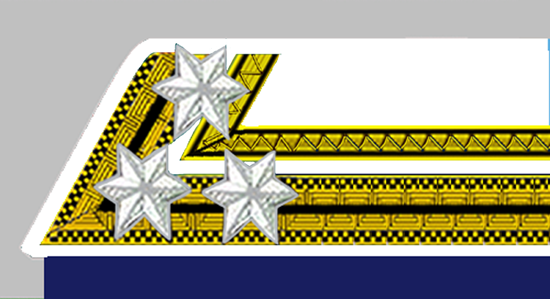
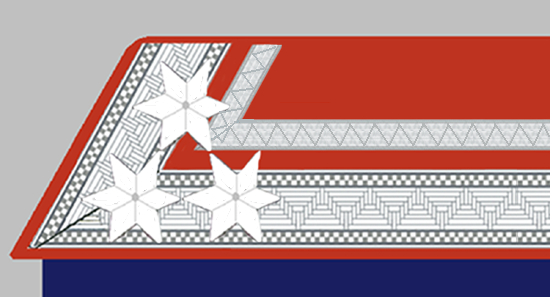
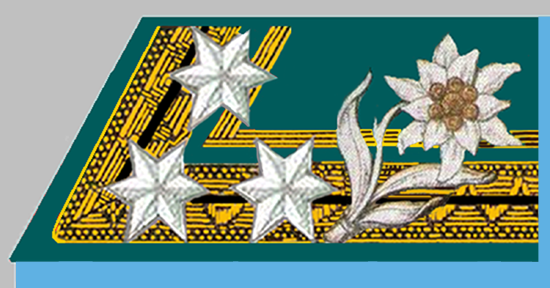
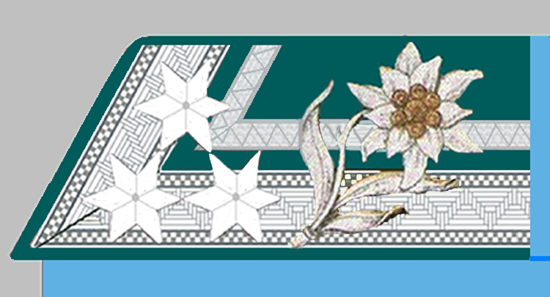
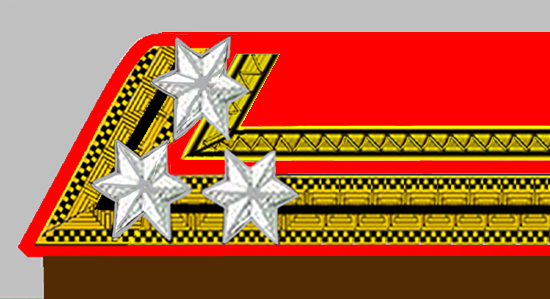
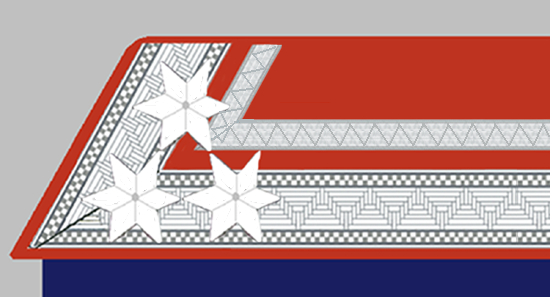
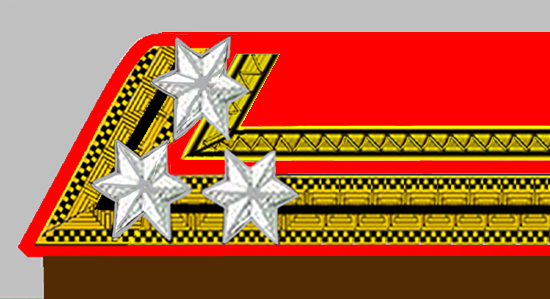
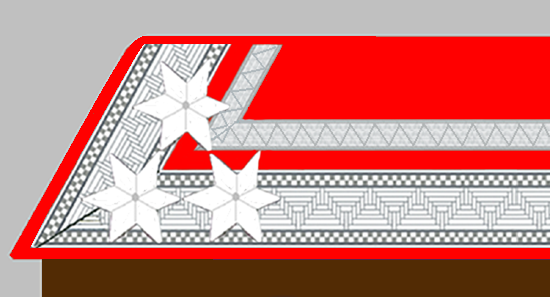
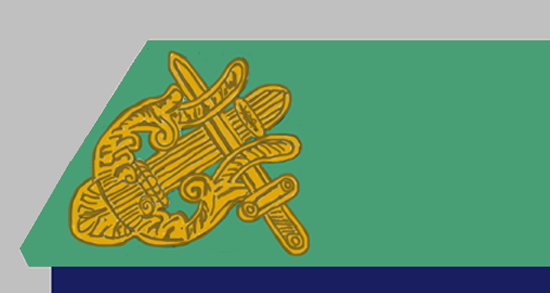
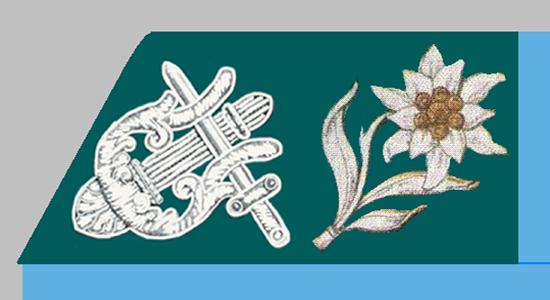
Designation	Stabsfeldwebel / First Sergeant ranks
Designation	1913–1914	1914–1918	1913–1914	1914–1918	1913–1914	1914–1918	1913–1914	1914–1918	1906–1918
Rank insignia
Rank description	Stabsfeldwebel		Stabsoberjäger		Stabswachtmeister		Stabsfeuerwerker		Militärkapellmeister
Branch	Infantry		Mountain infantry		Cavalry		Artillery		Military band
(English)	(1st sergeant)		(Rifles 1st sergeant)		(Cavalry 1st sergeant)		(Artillery 1st sergeant)		(Military bandmaster)

=== Higher Staff NCO-ranks and officer aspirant (OA) ranks ===
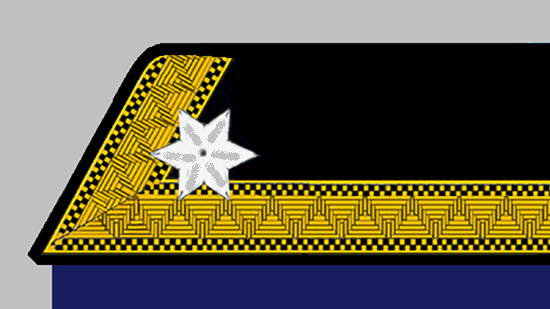
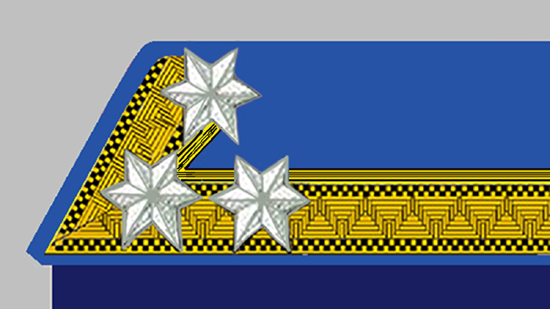
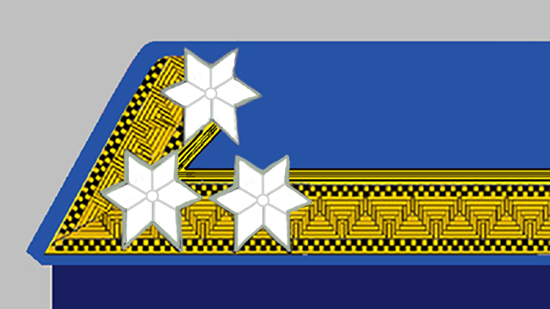
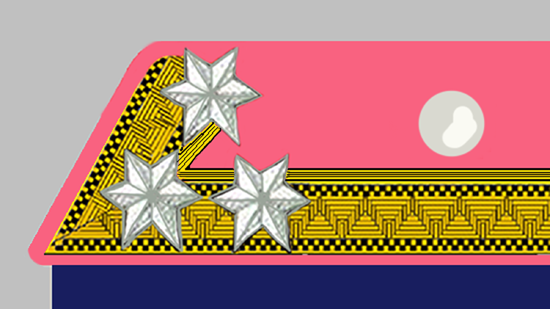
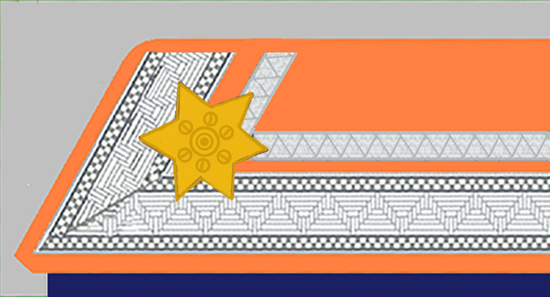
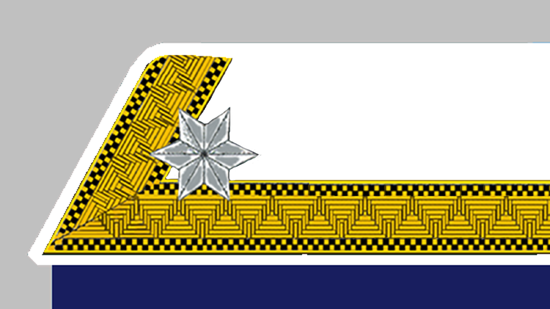
Designation	cancelled 1908	established 1908		1908–1918	1915–1918
Rank insignia
Rank description	Kadett-Offiziersstellvertreter	Kadett	Kadett; Einjähriger-Freiwilliger	Offiziersstellvertreter	Fähnrich
English	Cadet officer-deputy	Cadet	Cadet volunteer serving one year	Warrant officer	Ensign

=== Officers ===
The different colors of the rank patches and buttons on the tunic are the marks for identifying the infantry regiments (except Generals)
Description			Rank class	Insignia	
German	Hungarian	English	Rank class	Army	Mountain infantry
Low grade officer ranks
Leutnant also: Assistenz-Arzt; Leutnant-Rechnungsführer	Hadnagy	Second lieutenant	RK XI		
Oberleutnant also: Oberarzt; Oberleutnant-Auditor; Oberleutnant-Rechnungsführer	Főhadnagy	First lieutenant	RK X		
Captain ranks
Hauptmann also: Rittmeister; Regimentsarzt; Hauptmann-Auditor; Hauptmann-Rechnungsführer	Százados	Captain	RK IX		
Staff officer ranks
Major also: Stabsarzt; Major-Auditor	Őrnagy	Major	RK IIX		
Oberstleutnant also: Oberstabsarzt 2. Klasse; Oberstleutnant-Auditor	Alezredes	Lieutenant colonel	RK VII		
Oberst also: Oberstabsarzt 1. Klasse; Oberst-Auditor	Ezredes	Colonel	RK VI		

Note

The embroideries of the collars of the ranks major to colonel were always in the same color as the tunic buttons (silver/gold). The rank stars were converse (silver embroidery - golden star(s))
The ranks lieutenant to captain had stars in the same color as the tunic buttons.

=== Generals ===
Commander-in-chief and generals
Gorget patch					
Command flag		—N/a			
Title	Feldmarschall	Generaloberst	General der Waffengattung: General der Infanterie; General der Kavallerie; Feldzeugmeister	Feldmarschall-Leutnant: General-Oberstabsarzt; General-Chefauditor	Generalmajor
English	Field-marshal	Colonel general	General of the branch: General of the infantry; General of the cavalry; General of the artillery	Lieutenant field-marshal: General-Chief Staff Surgeon; General-Chief Auditor	Major general

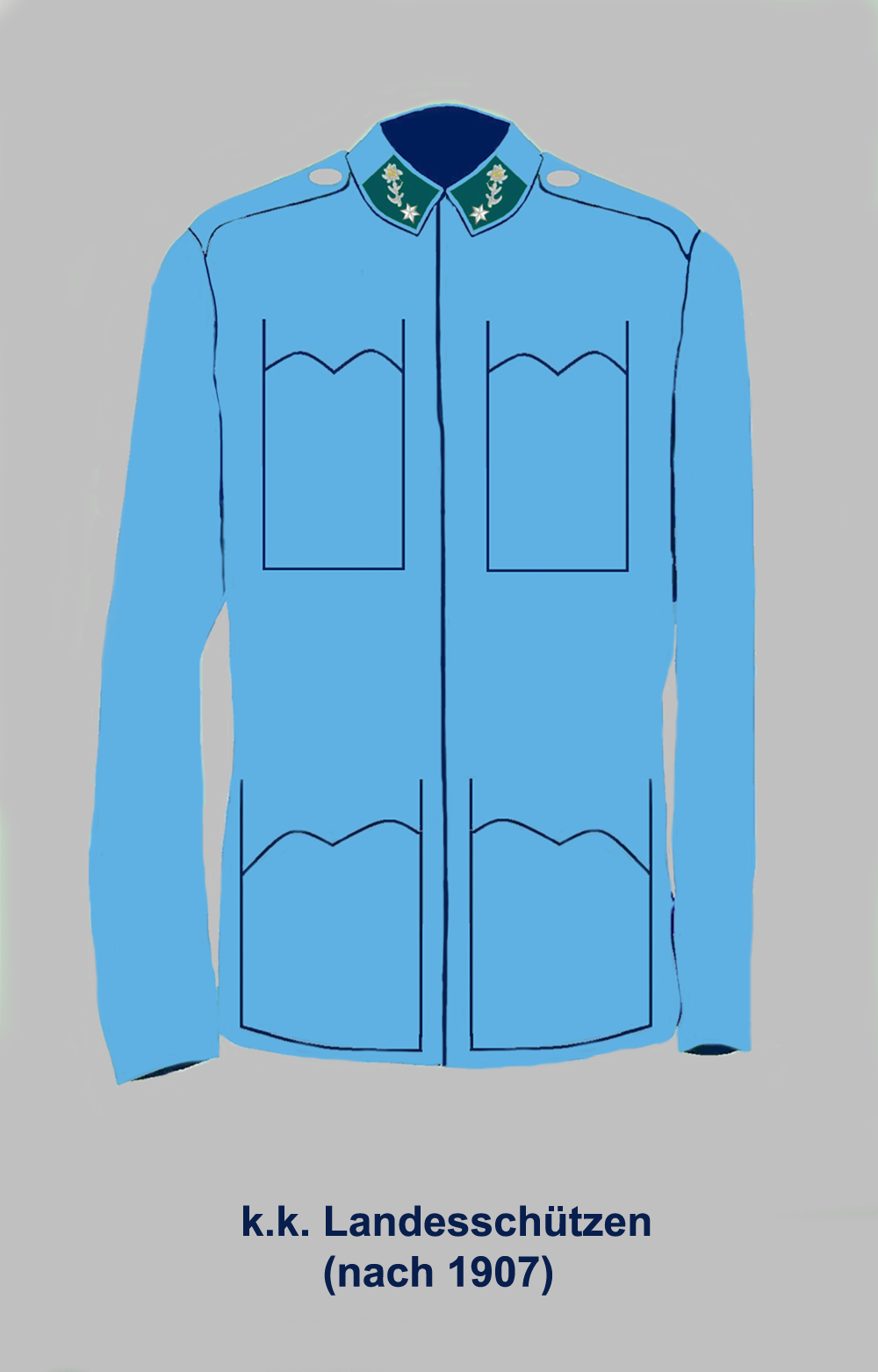
Gorget patches on the tunic of a k.k. Landwehr rifle

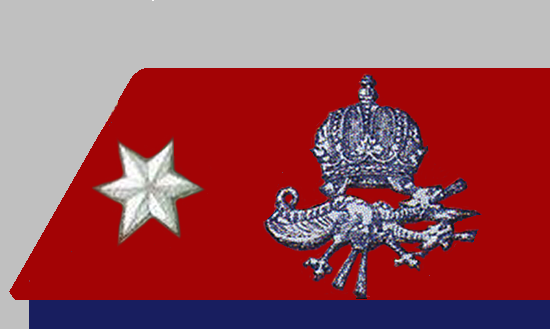
Gorget patch, Gefreiter machine-gun unit

In the course of uniform reorganisation pertaining the Imperial-Royal Landwehr (de: k.k. Landwehr), the service coat (Waffenrock or Uniformrock) of all enlisted personnel was substituted by a tunic (Bluse) in general. The rotary-coloured gorget patch was replaced by a standard gorget patch (Paroli) in grass-green with rank insignias. According to the special function, e.g. as member to a "machine gun unit", the Edelweiss on the gorget patch was additional.

== Enlisted personnel insignia of Guards formations ==
In the Austrian-Hungarian armed forces there existed five guard units. In two of them served exclusively officer grades. The remaining three of them were called "Enlisted men guards" (Mannschaftsgarden).

Rank		Description of the rank insignia
German	English	Description of the rank insignia
Gardeinfanterist / Gardereiter	Guardsman / Guard trooper	15mm broad imperial yellow silk galloon; three white stars from silk; scarlet corps colour
Gardekorporal (Guard infantry)	Guard corporal	18mm broad imperial yellow silk galloon (divided by a 1mm broad black stripe); three white stars from silk; scarlet corps colour
Gardezugsführer (Guard infantry)	Guard sergeant	20mm broad imperial yellow silk galloon (divided by a 1mm broad black stripe); three white stars from silk; scarlet corps colour
2. Gardewachtmeister (Guard cavalry)	Guard master sergeant 2nd class	20mm broad imperial yellow silk galloon (divided by a 1mm broad black stripe); three white stars from silk; scarlet corps colour
Gardefeldwebel (Guard infantry)	Guard master sergeant	22mm broad imperial yellow silk galloon (divided by a 1mm broad black stripe); three white stars from silk; scarlet corps colour
1. Gardewachtmeister (Guard cavalry)	Guard master sergeant 1st class	22mm broad imperial yellow silk galloon (divided by a 1mm broad black stripe); three white stars from silk; scarlet corps colour
Trabanten-Leibgarde	Companion life-guards	18mm broad imperial yellow silk galloon (divided by a 1mm broad black stripe); three white stars from silk; ponceau-red corps colour
Vizeskondewachtmeister der Trabanten-Leibgarde	2nd vice master sergeant of the companion life-guards	20mm broad imperial yellow silk galloon (divided by a 1mm broad black stripe); three white stars from silk; ponceau-red corps colour

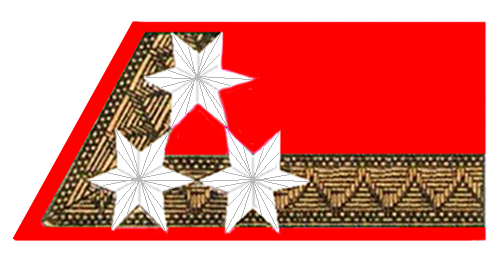
Gardeinfanterist
(Guardsman)

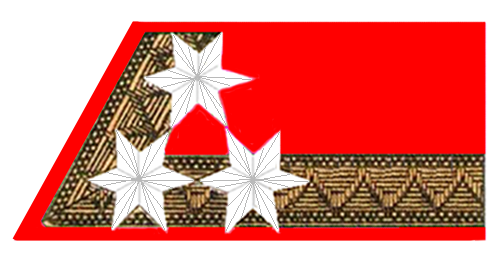
Gardereiter
(Guard trooper)

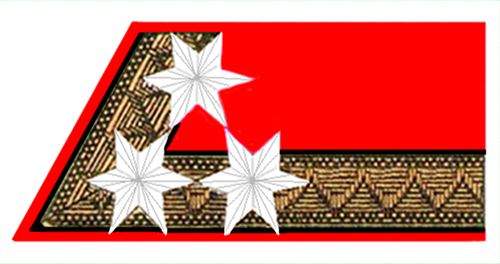
Gardekorporal
(Guard corporal)

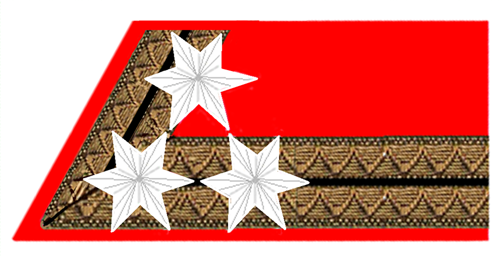
Gardezugsführer
(Guard sergeant)

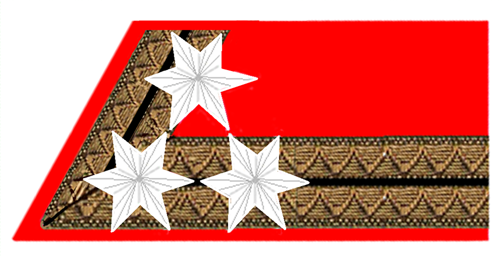
2. Gardewachtmeister
(Guard cavalry master sergeant 2nd class)

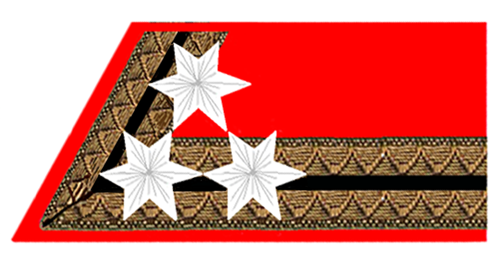
Gardefeldwebel
(Guard feldwebel)

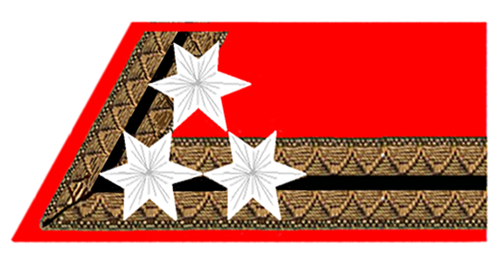
1. Gardewachtmeister
(Guard cavalry master sergeant 1st class)

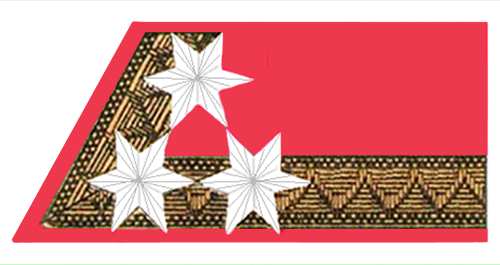
Trabanten Garde
(Guard - Companion life-guards)

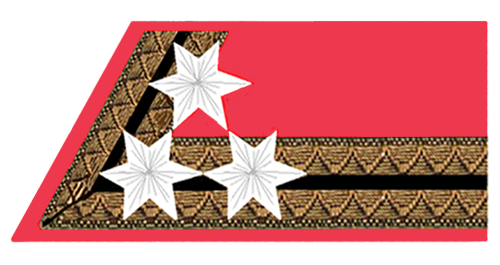
Vizesekonde-wachtmeister
(2nd vice master sergeant of the companion life-guards)

There was no difference between the rank insignias of the officers in comparison to regular troops.

== Estate riflemen troops ==
k.k. Estate riflemen units and companies were established in the 15th/16th century and did belong to the so-called Landwehr (en: home guard). However, k.k. Estate riflemen troops did not wear regular uniforms. After k.k. Estate riflemen troops had to be involved in 1915 to regular military engagement, the Austrian-Hungarian administration was forced to procure these units with regular uniforms. To emphasise the character and status of the Estate riflemen, they did wear slightly different rank insignias. Officer collar patches showed a gold embroidered rosette. Pertaining enlisted personnel and NCOs the rosette was silver embroidered. Because silver and gold embroidery was deficit, the rosettes were finally replaced by celluloid stars, as this was the case to regular troops. The rank insignias were fixed on the collar patches (Parolis) showing at the background the corps colour of the Riflemen infantry (also: Hunter-troops or Riflemen-troops; Jägertruppe) "Grass-green". Tyrolese collar patches showed the silver metallic "Tyrol eagle" behind the rosette/star. For the Vorarlberg estate riflemen the eagle was replaced by a white metallic shield with the "Vorarlberg coat of arms".

Major was the highest rank of the Estate riflemen troops.

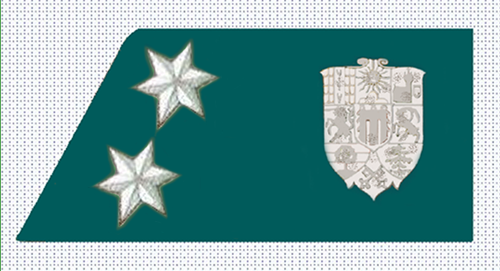
Unterjäger (Vorarlberg)
(Corporal - Vorarlberg)

Zugsführer (Vorarlberg)
(Master corporal - Vorarlberg)

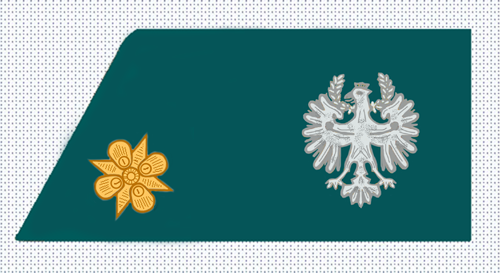
Leutnant (Tirol)
(2nd Lieutenant - Tyrol)

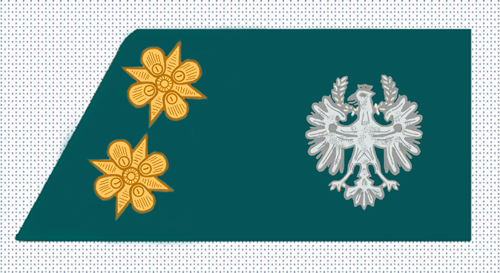
Oberleutnant (Tirol)
(1st Lieutenant - Tyrol)

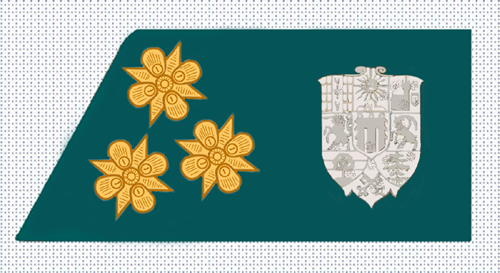
Hauptmann (Vorarlberg)
(Captain - Vorarlberg)

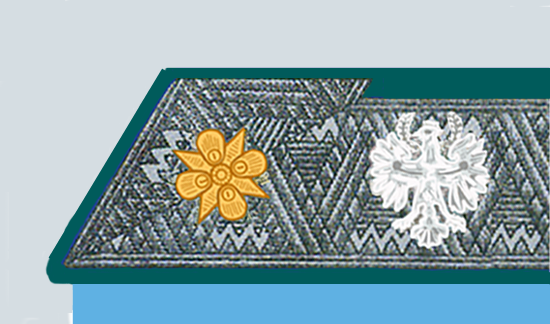
Major (Tirol)
(Major - Tyrol)

== Military officials ==
As regards to military officials, there were in force exactly the same rules who applied to military officer ranks. However, military officials wore only four-leaved star rosettes instead of the rank stars (the only exception: officials with explicit star ranks!).

Fiscal officials (Rechnungsführer) in line service have been provided always with silver color buttons.

Further exemptions from the principal rule are described as follows

- Military officials with port epée: Staff ranks wore a galloon with applied "cross-band ornament" (Kreuzbandmuster)
  - Military commissariat official: in the Common Army – golden color buttons; in the home guard (Landwehr) silver color buttons
  - Military construction engineers: in the Common Army – silver color buttons; in the home guard golden color buttons),
- Military officials without port epée: Staff ranks wore a galloon with "waved cross-band ornament" (gewelltes Kreuzbandmuster)
  - Auditors: in the Common Army gold color buttons; in the Home guard silver buttons
  - Military surgeon officer corps: in the Common Army gold color buttons; in the Home guard silver buttons (with the appropriate variations of collar)
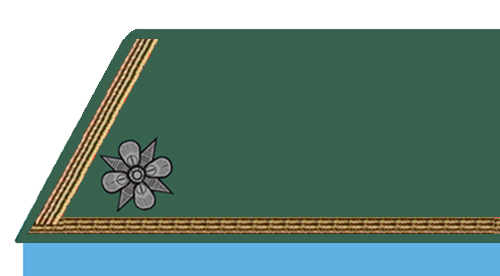
Rank class XII - here: Aspirant in the Railway regiment or Telegraph regiment

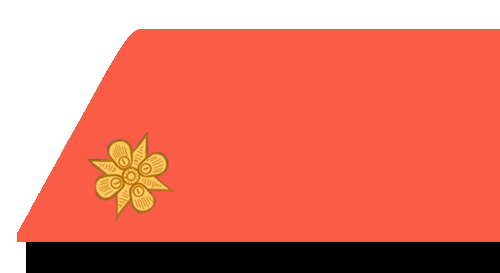
Rank class XI - here: Untertierarzt
(Sub veterinarian)

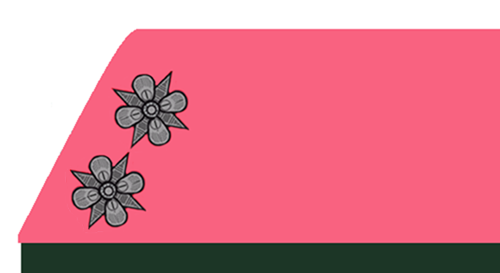
Rank class X – here: Kassenoffizial
(Cashier's official)

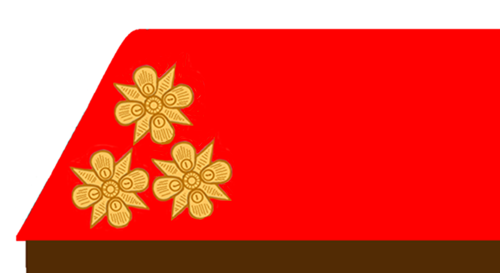
Rank class IX – here: Artilleriezeugs-oberoffizial
(Artillery ordnance senior official)

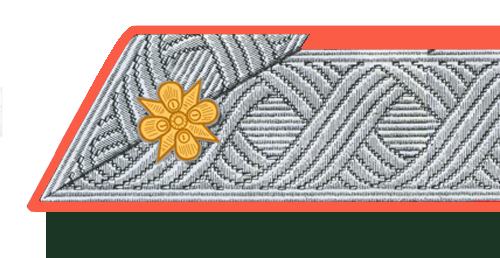
Rank class VIII – here: Stabsapotheker
(Staff pharmacist)

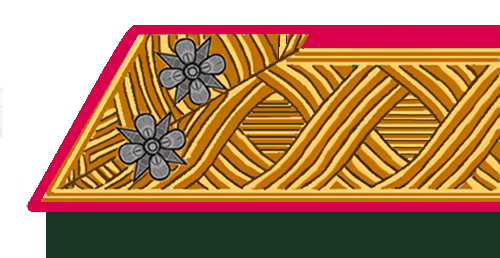
Rank class VII - here: Oberintendant 2. Klasse
(Senior commissioner 2nd class)

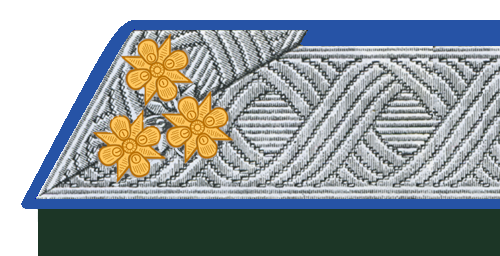
Rank class VI - here: Oberverpflegs-verwalter 1. Klasse
(Senior food supply administrator 1st class)

== Examples ==
The gallery below shows examples of different kinds of Adjustierung (en: uniforms).

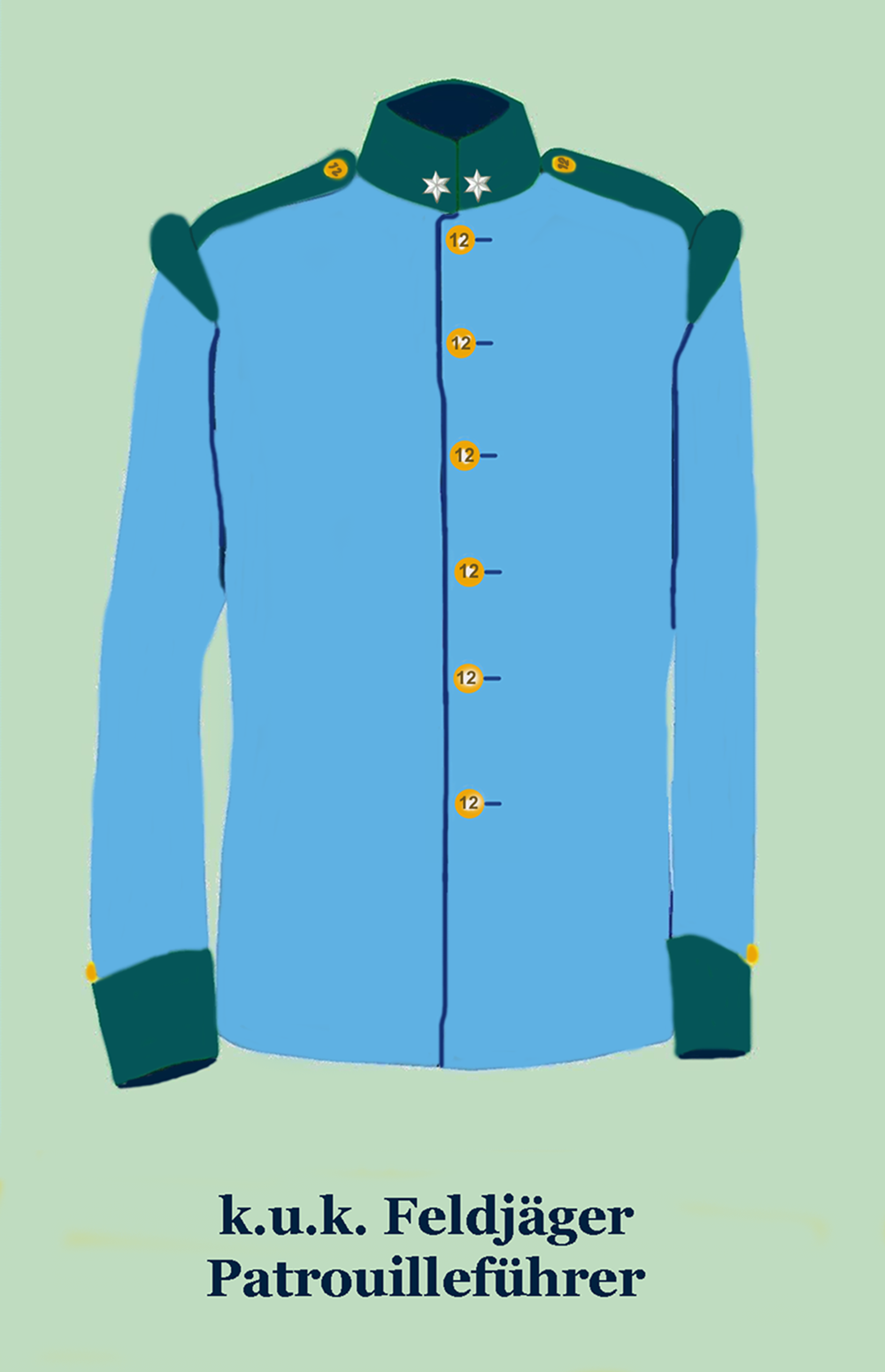
k.u.k. Patroilleführer, Feldjäger
(k.u.k. Rifleman 1st class, light infantry)

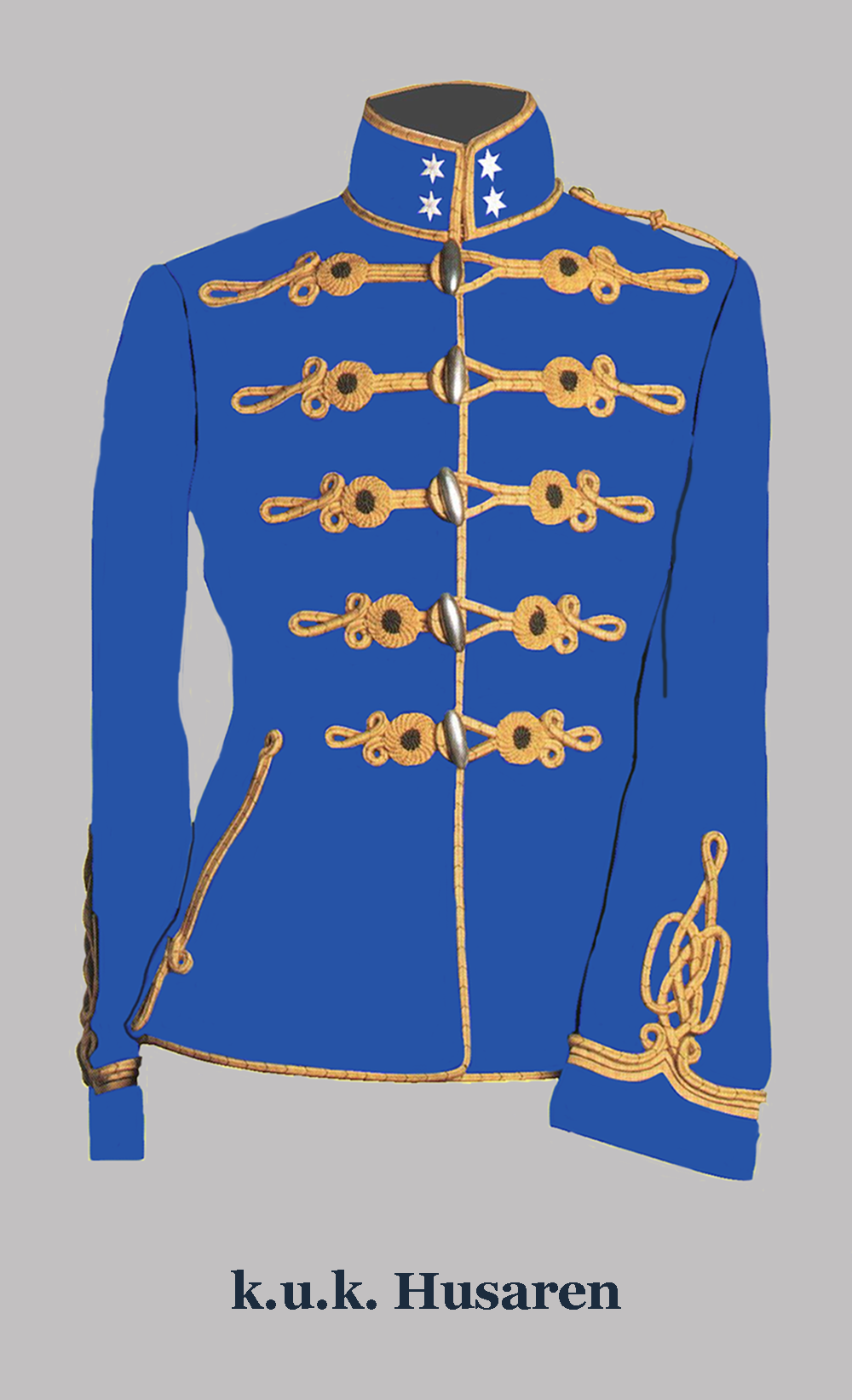
Korporal der Husaren
(Corporal of the Hussars)

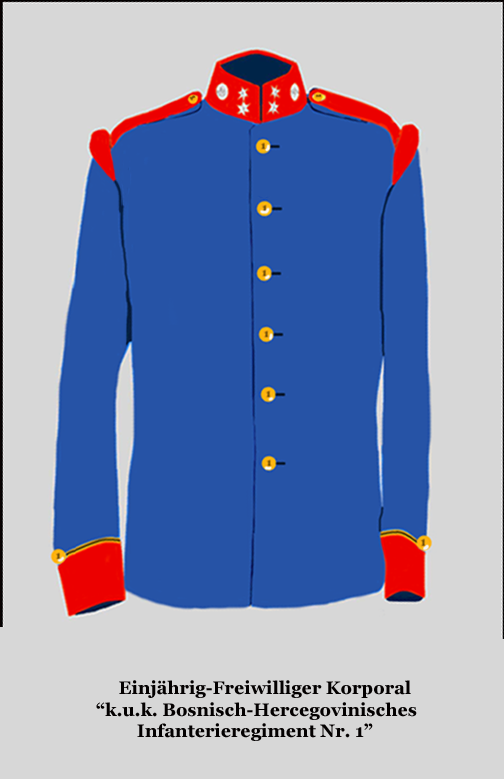
Einjährig-Freiwilliger, Korporal
(Volunteer serving one year, Corporal)

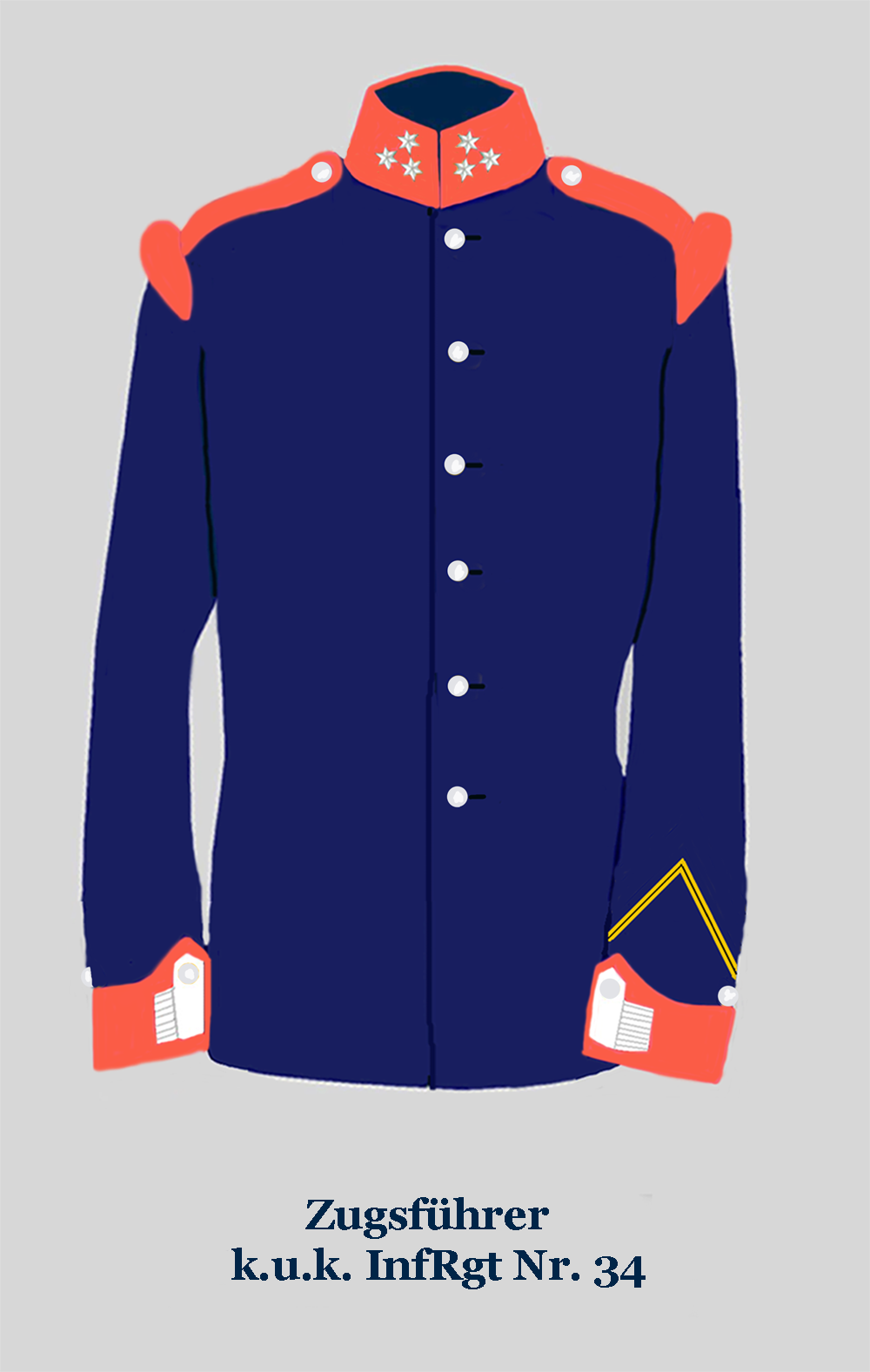
Zugsführer (Ungarische Uniform)
(Sergeant Hungarian uniform)

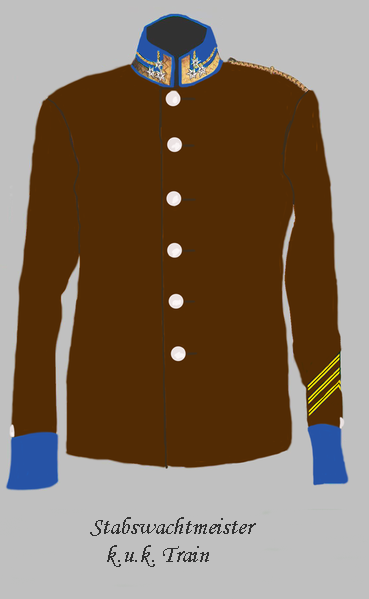
Stabswachtmeister (der Traintruppe) vor 1913
(Cavalry 1st sergeant, train troops before 1913)

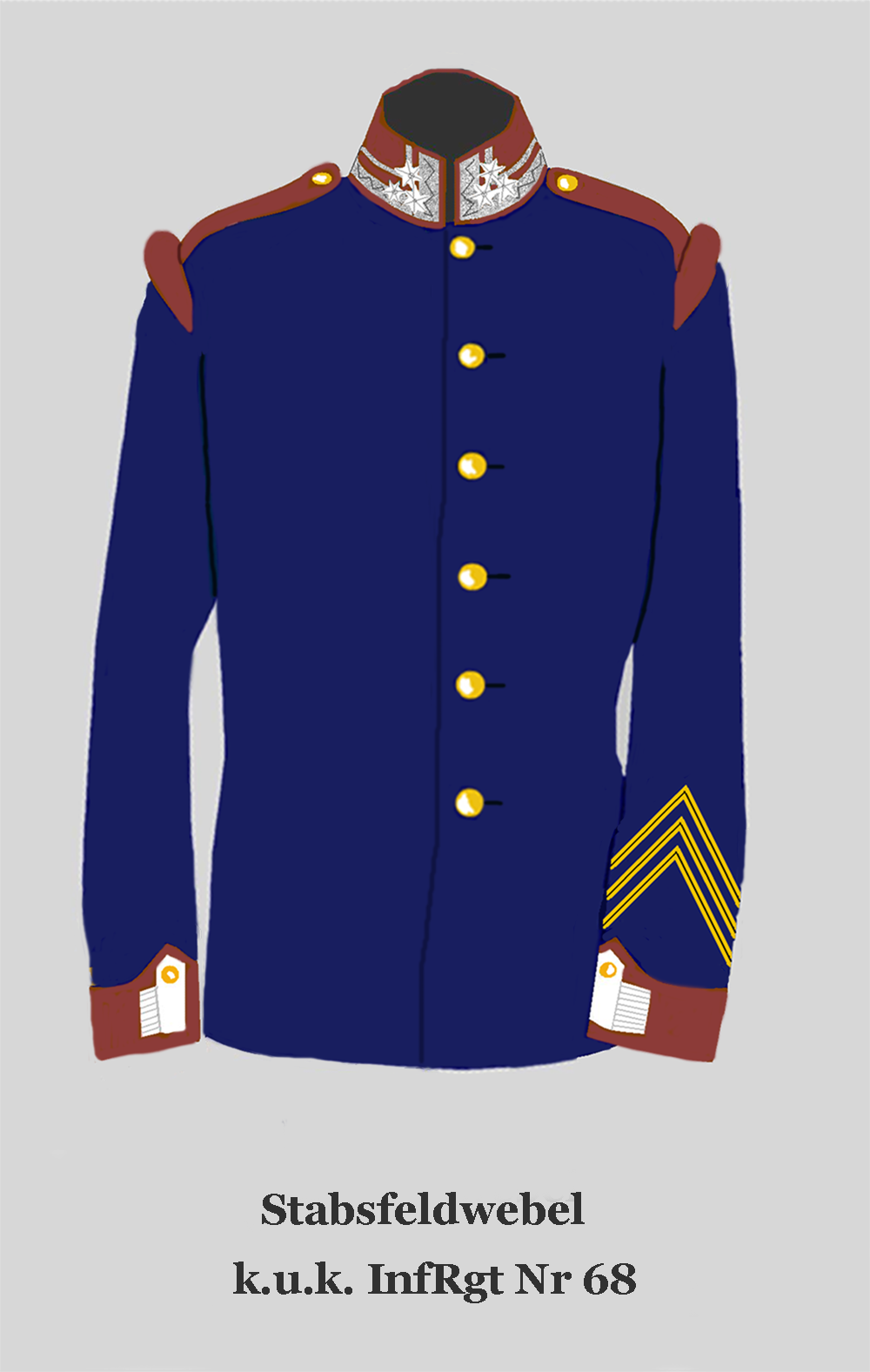
Stabsfeldwebel (ungarische Uniform) nach 1913
(1st Sergeant, Hungarian Uniform)

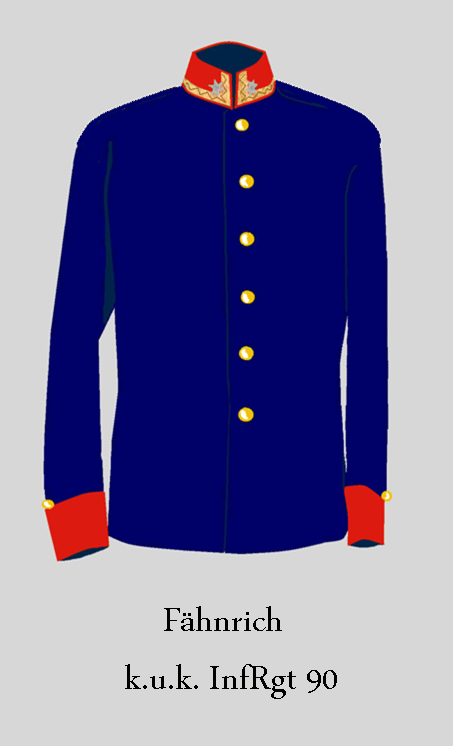
Fähnrich (Deutsche Uniform)
(Ensign, German uniform)

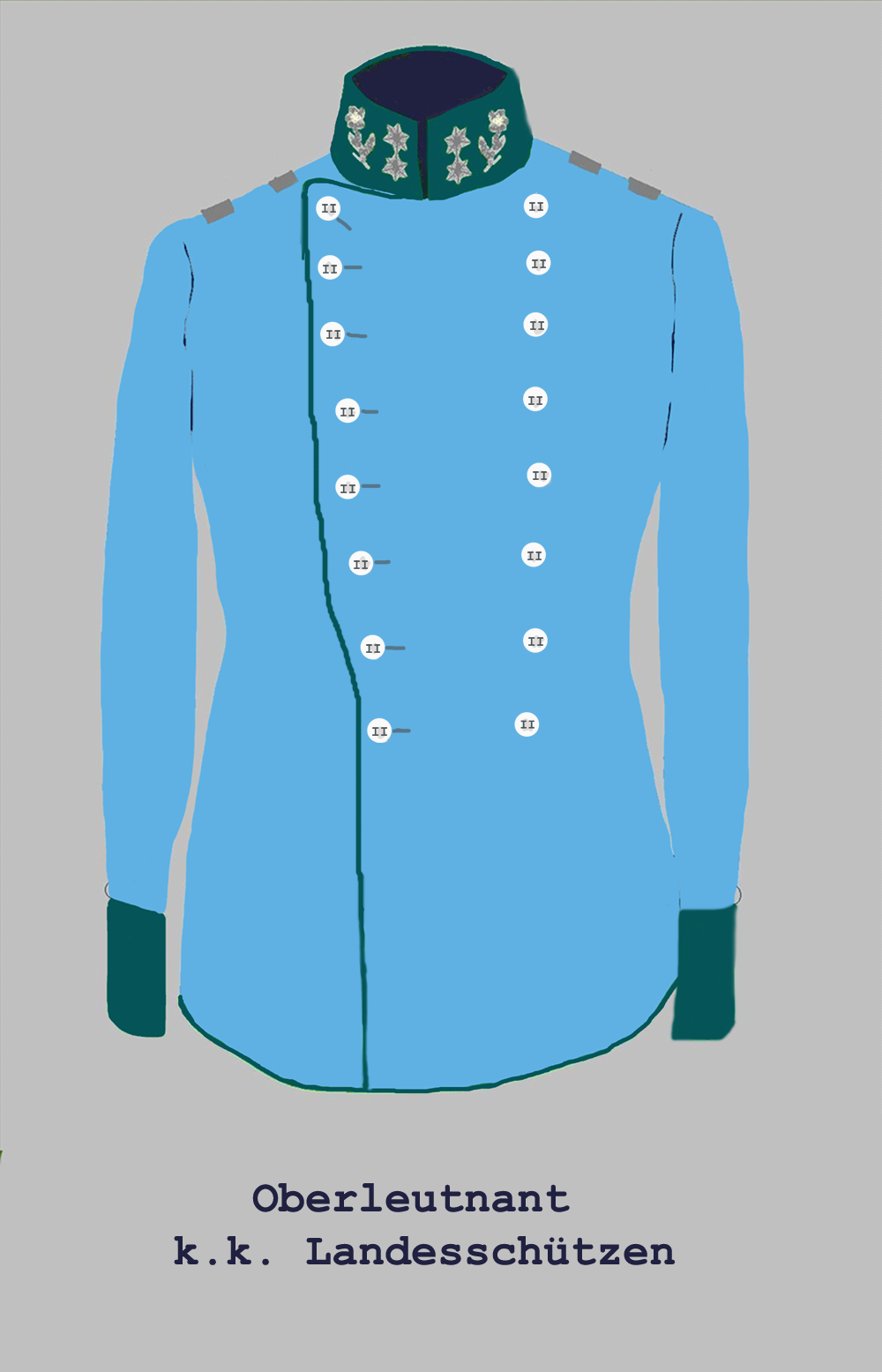
Oberleutnant der Landeschützen
(1st Lieutenant Mountain Infantry)

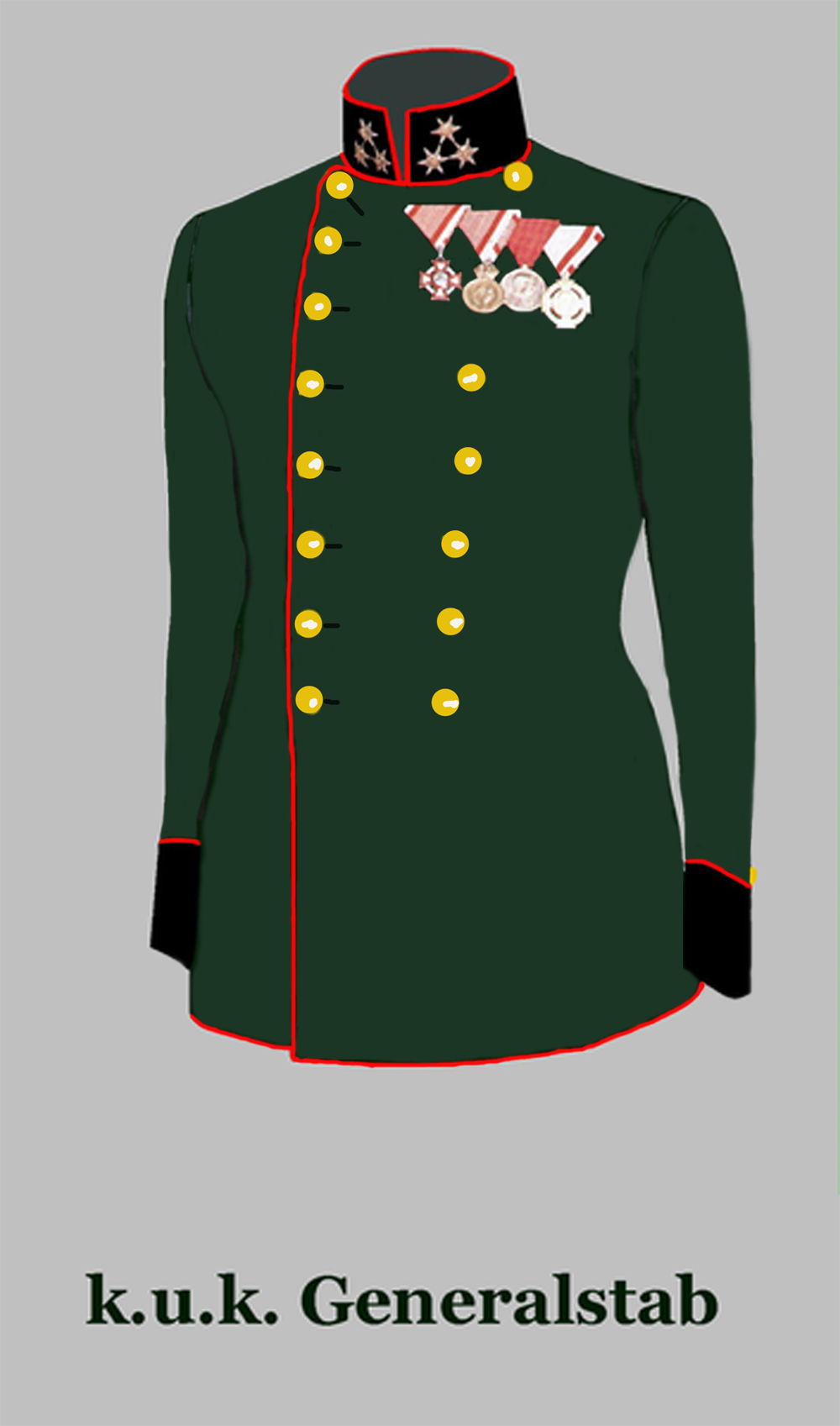
Hauptmann im Generalstab
(Captain in the general staff)

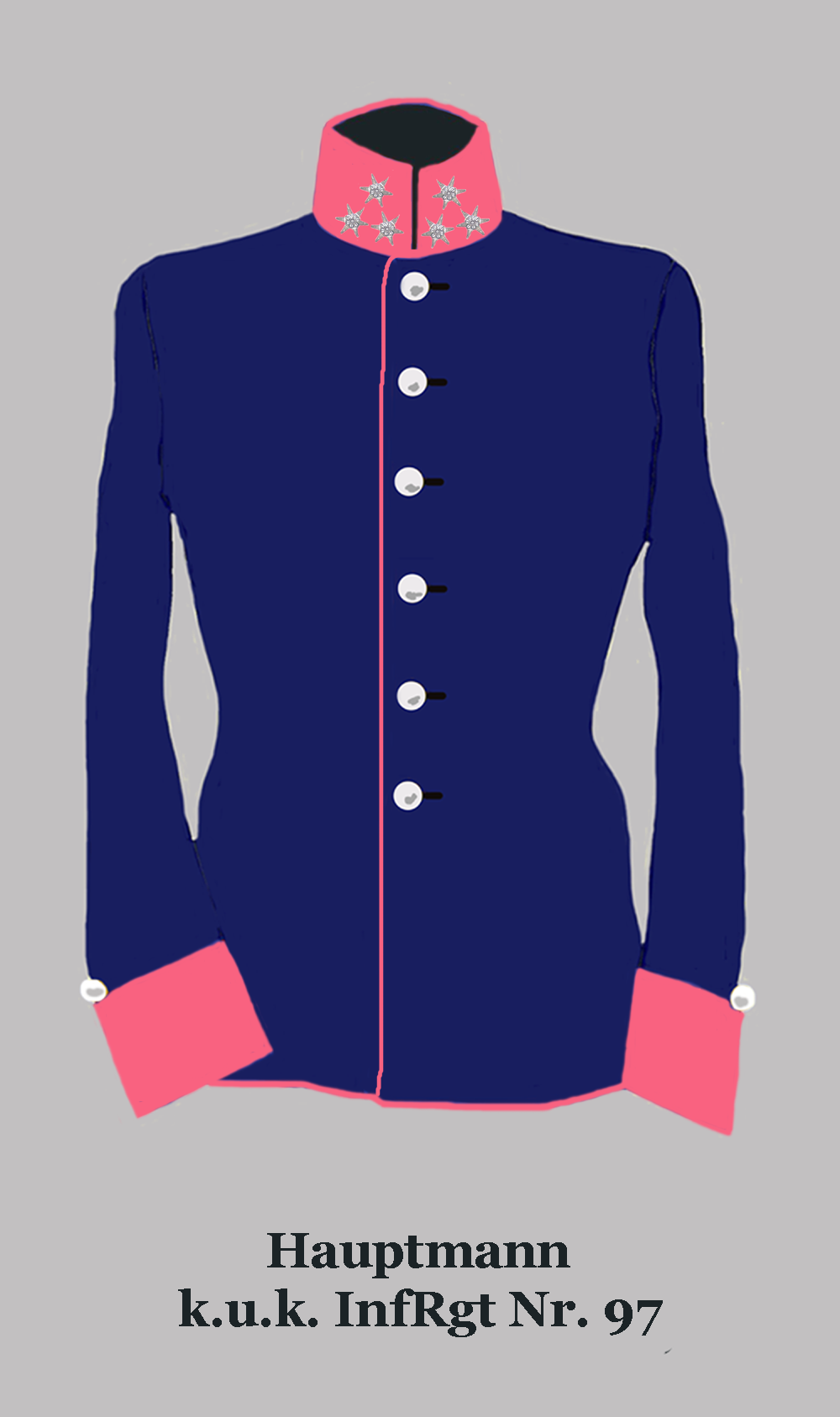
Hauptmann (Deutsche Uniform)
(Captain, German uniform)

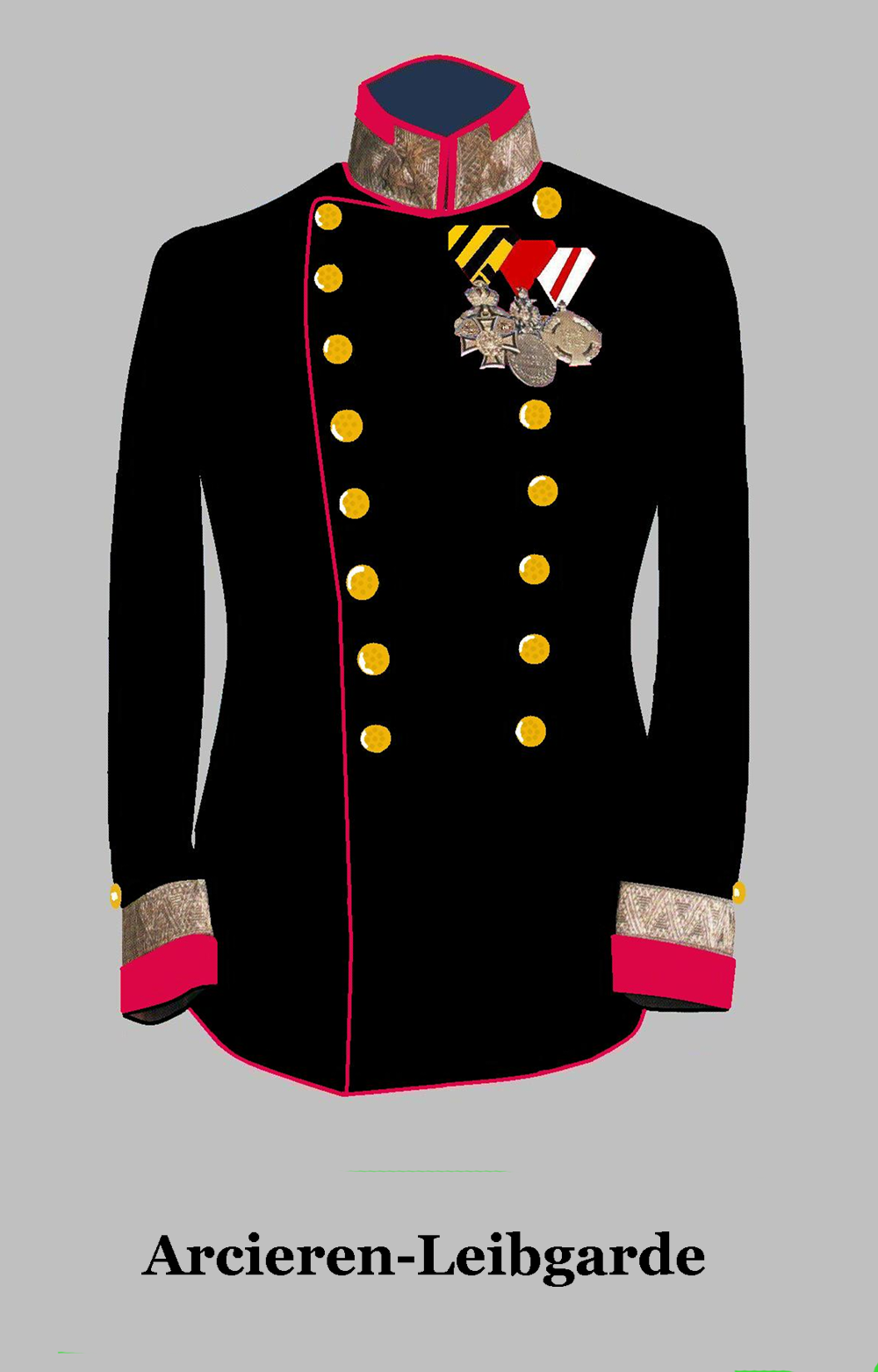
Oberst
(Colonel)

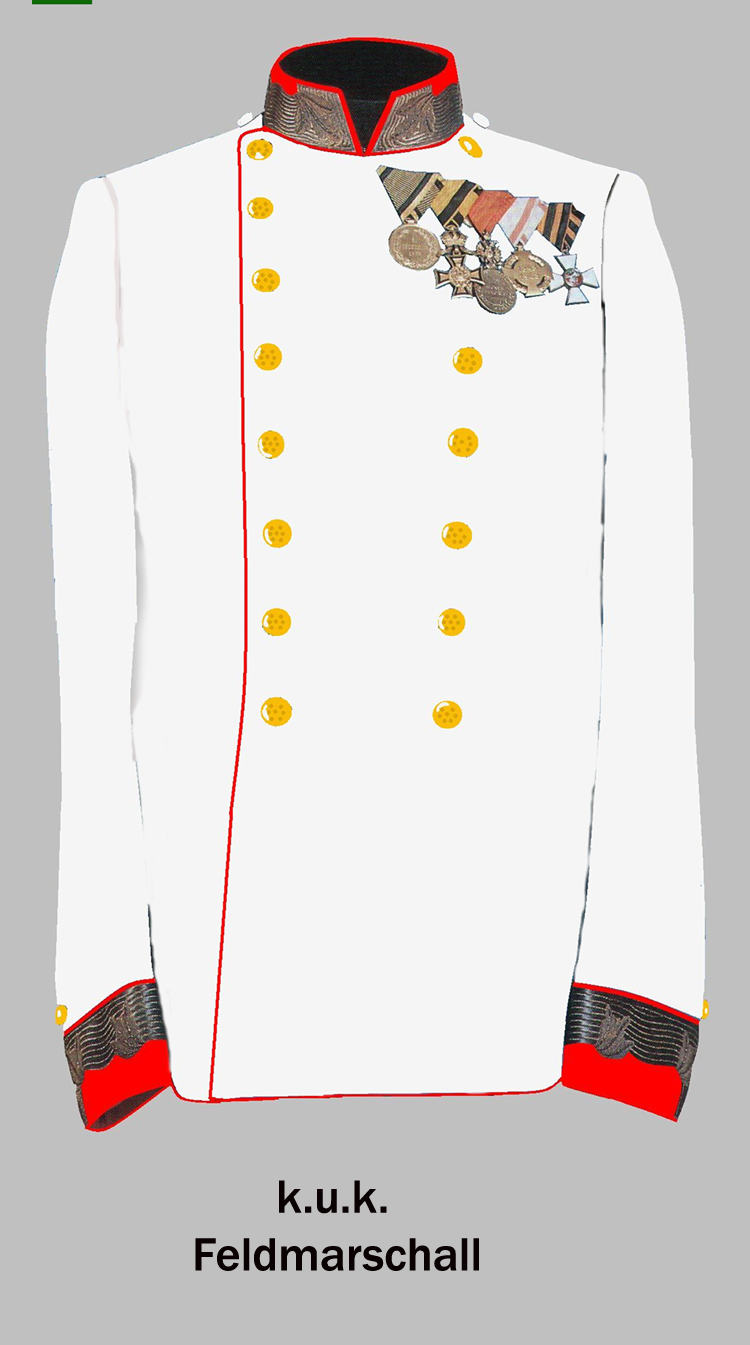
Feldmarschall Gala
(Field marshal Gala tunic)

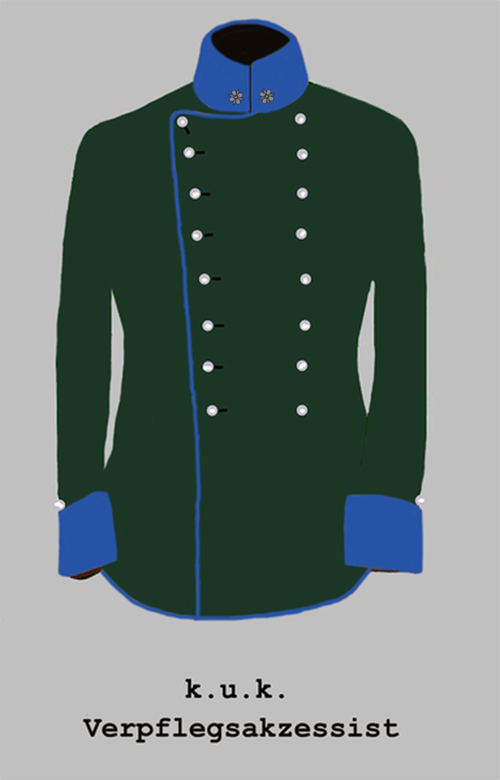
Verpflegsakzessist
(Food supply accessionist/ Official)

== See also ==
- Adjustierung
- Ranks in the Austro-Hungarian Navy

== Sources ==
- Schriften des Heeresgeschichtlichen Museums in Wien Das k.u.k. Heer im Jahre 1895, Edition Leopold Stocker, Graz, 1997 ISBN 3-7020-0783-0
- Rest, Ortner, Illming Des Kaisers Rock im 1. Weltkrieg, Edition Militaria, Vienna, 2002 ISBN 3-9501642-0-0
