= Patrouilleführer =

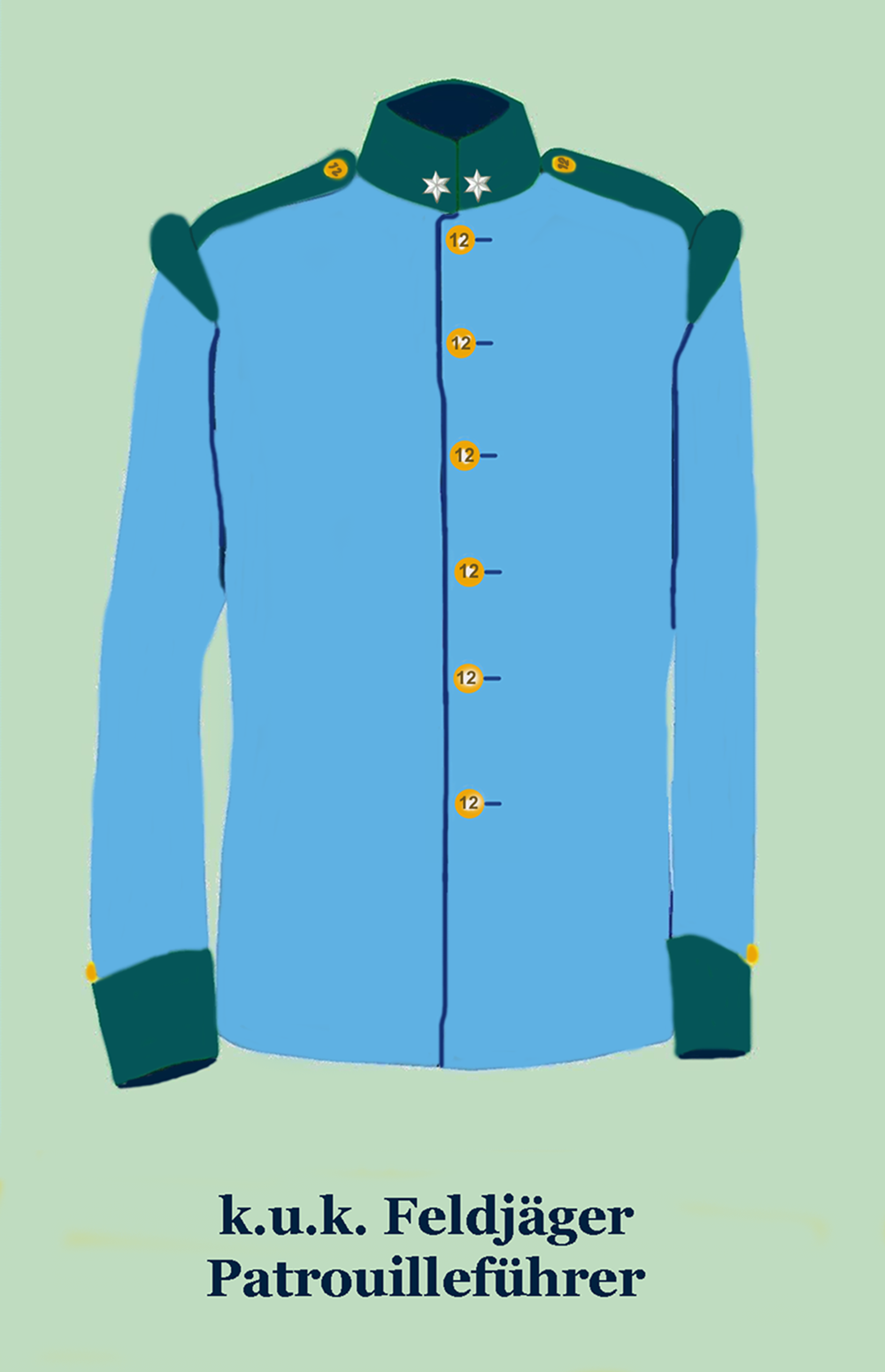
Patrol leader of the k.u.k. 7th Feldjäger bataillon (Waffenrock to the parade Adjustierung

Patrouilleführer (en: patrol leader) was a military rank of the k.u.k. Austro-Hungarian Army (1867–1918). It might be comparable to enlisted men OR2/ Private 1st class ranks in Anglophone armed forces.

However, in German speaking armed forces it was equivalent to the Gefreiter ranks (OR-2).

In the k.u.k. Austro-Hungarian Army it was used by the k.u.k. Kaiserjäger as well as the k.u.k. Feldjäger; later also in the Standschützen troops, and the k.u.k. Cavalry. It was also corresponding to Gefreiter (Hungarian: Őrvezetö of the k.u.k. Infantry, Sanitätsgefreiter (en: medical gefreiter) of the k.u.k. Medical corps, as well as to Vormeister of the k.u.k. Artillery corps and to the k.u.k. Machine gun troops.

Then rank insignia was a single white celluloid-star on grass-green stand-up collar of the so-called Waffenrock (en: uniform jacket) on gorget patch with a grass-green background (de: Paroli).

Junior rank Infanterist (Honvéd)	(k.u.k. Army rank); Patrouilleführer	Senior rank Korporal

== Rank insignia ==
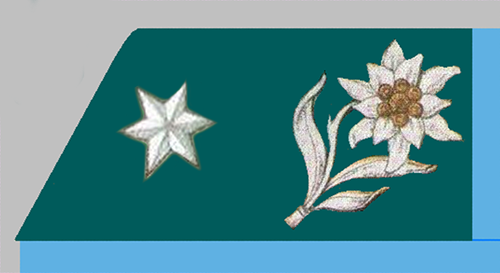
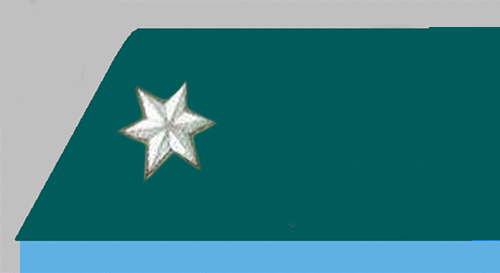
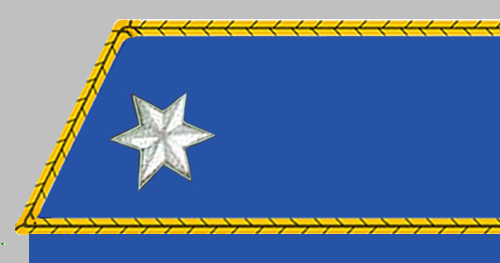
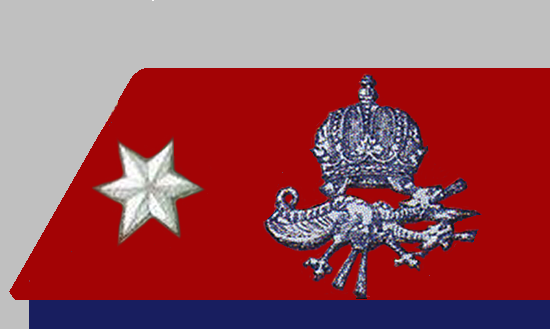
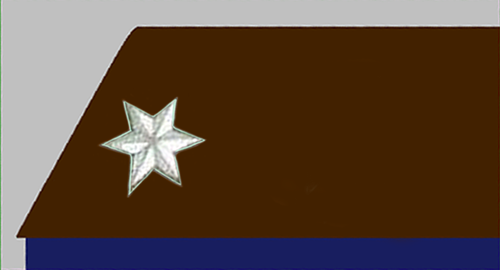
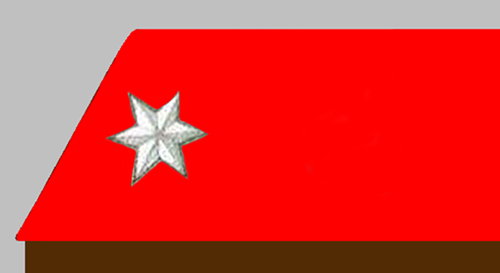
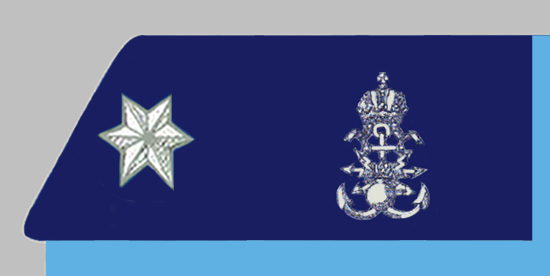
Desigahntion	Austrian k.u.k. Army enlisted men OR2 ranks
								N/A
insignia								N/A
description	Patrouilleführer			Gefreiter		Vormeister	Gefreiter	Sanitätsgefreiter
	k.u.k. Mountain troops	k.u.k. Rifles		Machine-gun units	Infantry generic
branch	Rifles		Cavalry	Infantry		Artillery	Military engineering	Medical corps
(equivalent)	(Rifle 1st class)		(Private 1st class)			(Gunner 1st class)	(Private 1st class)
