= Military ranks of Austria =

The Military ranks of Austria (or Ranks of the Bundesheer) are the military insignia used by the Austrian Armed Forces. Austria is a landlocked country and has no navy.

== Commissioned officer ranks ==
The rank insignia of commissioned officers.

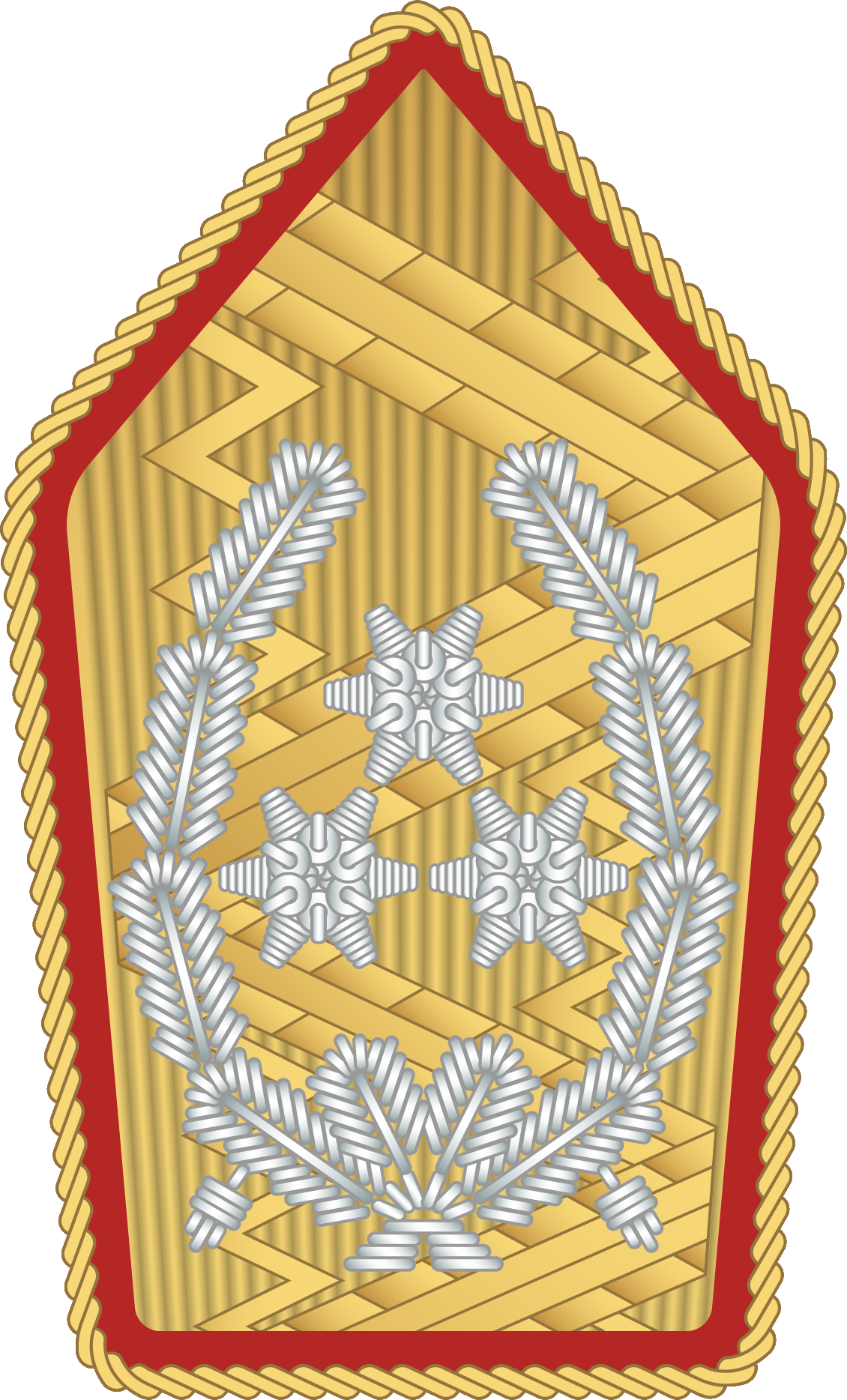
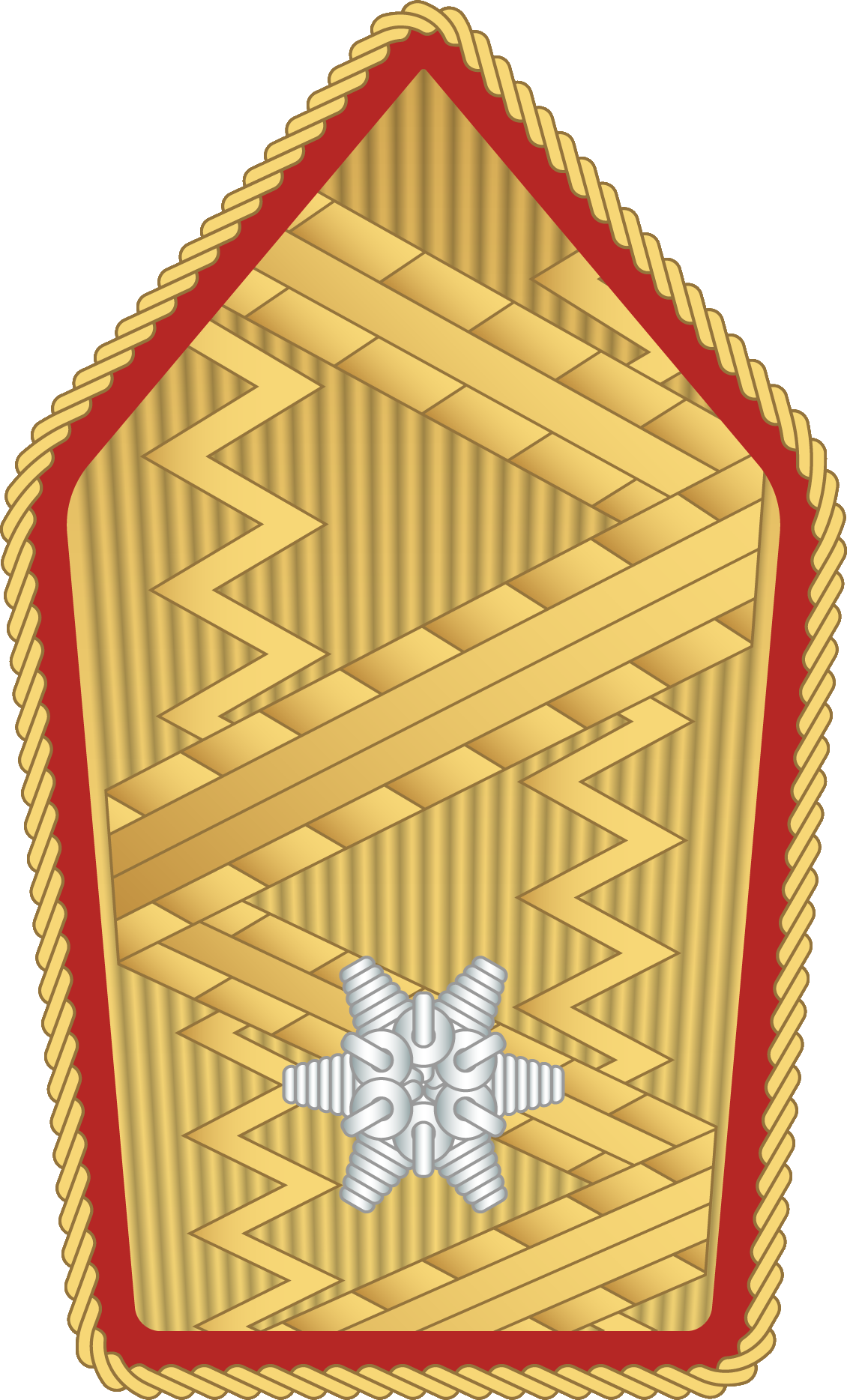
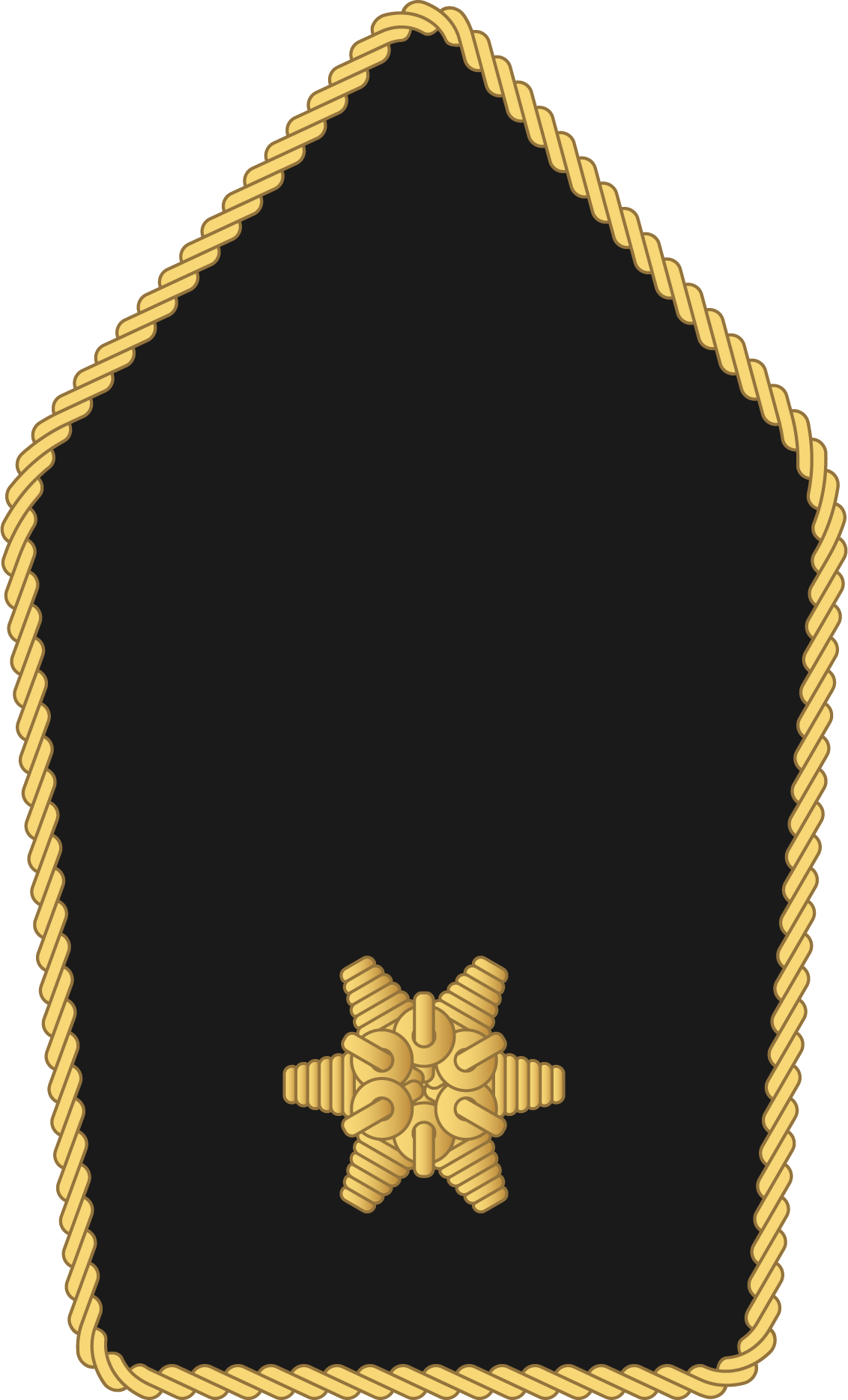
Rank group	General / flag officers				Senior officers			Junior officers
Cap
Service uniform
Field uniform
	General	Generalleutnant	Generalmajor	Brigadier	Oberst	Oberstleutnant	Major	Hauptmann	Oberleutnant	Leutnant
Official translation	General	Lieutenant general	Major general	Brigadier general	Colonel	Lieutenant colonel	Major	Captain	First lieutenant	Second lieutenant
Equivalent NATO code (Note: While Austria is not a member of NATO, it does have an official conversion.)	OF-9	OF-8	OF-7	OF-6	OF-5	OF-4	OF-3	OF-2	OF-1

=== Student officer ranks ===
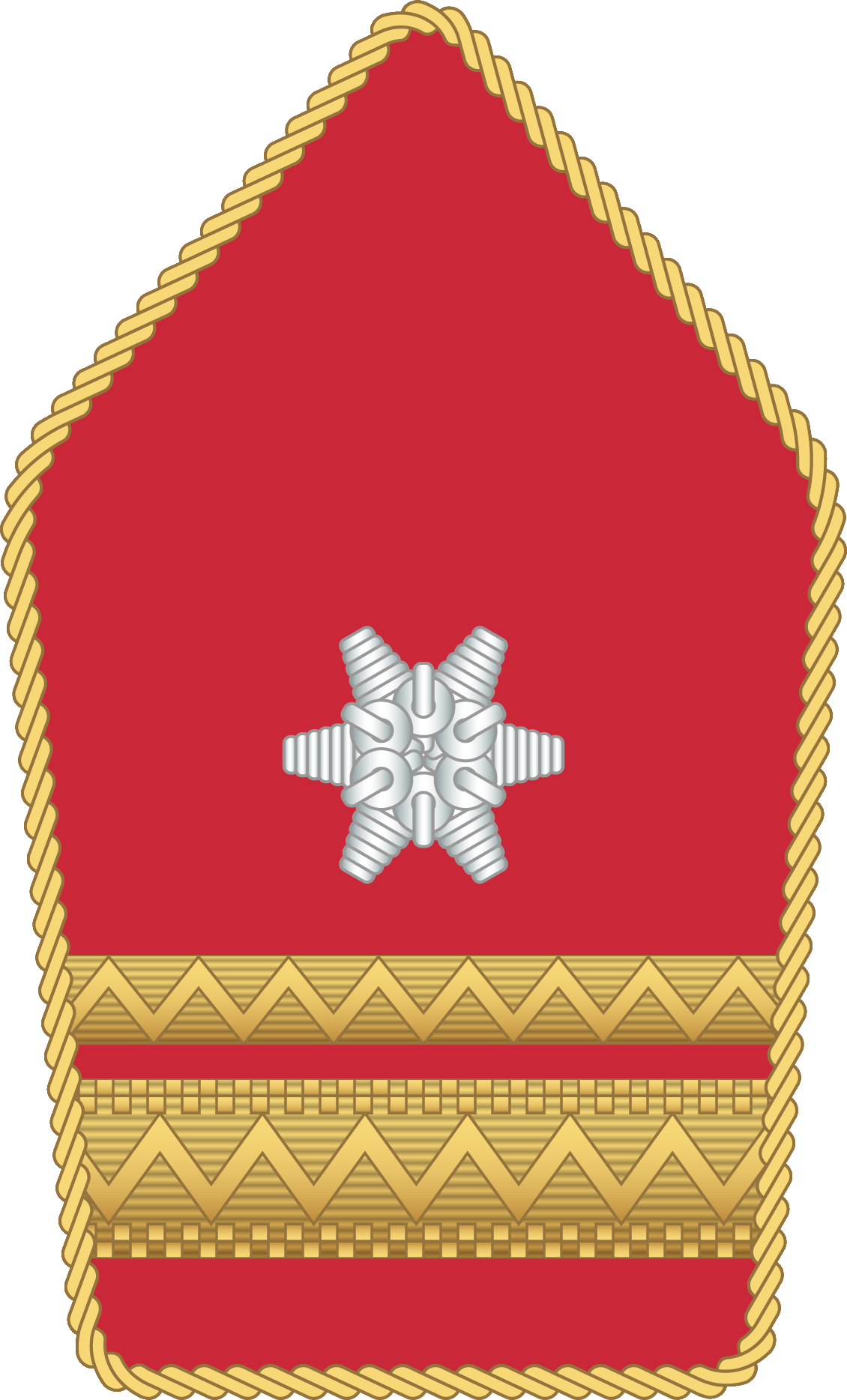
Rank group	Student officer
Cap
Service uniform
Field uniform
	Fähnrich
Official translation	Officer cadet

== Other ranks ==
The rank insignia of non-commissioned officers and enlisted personnel.

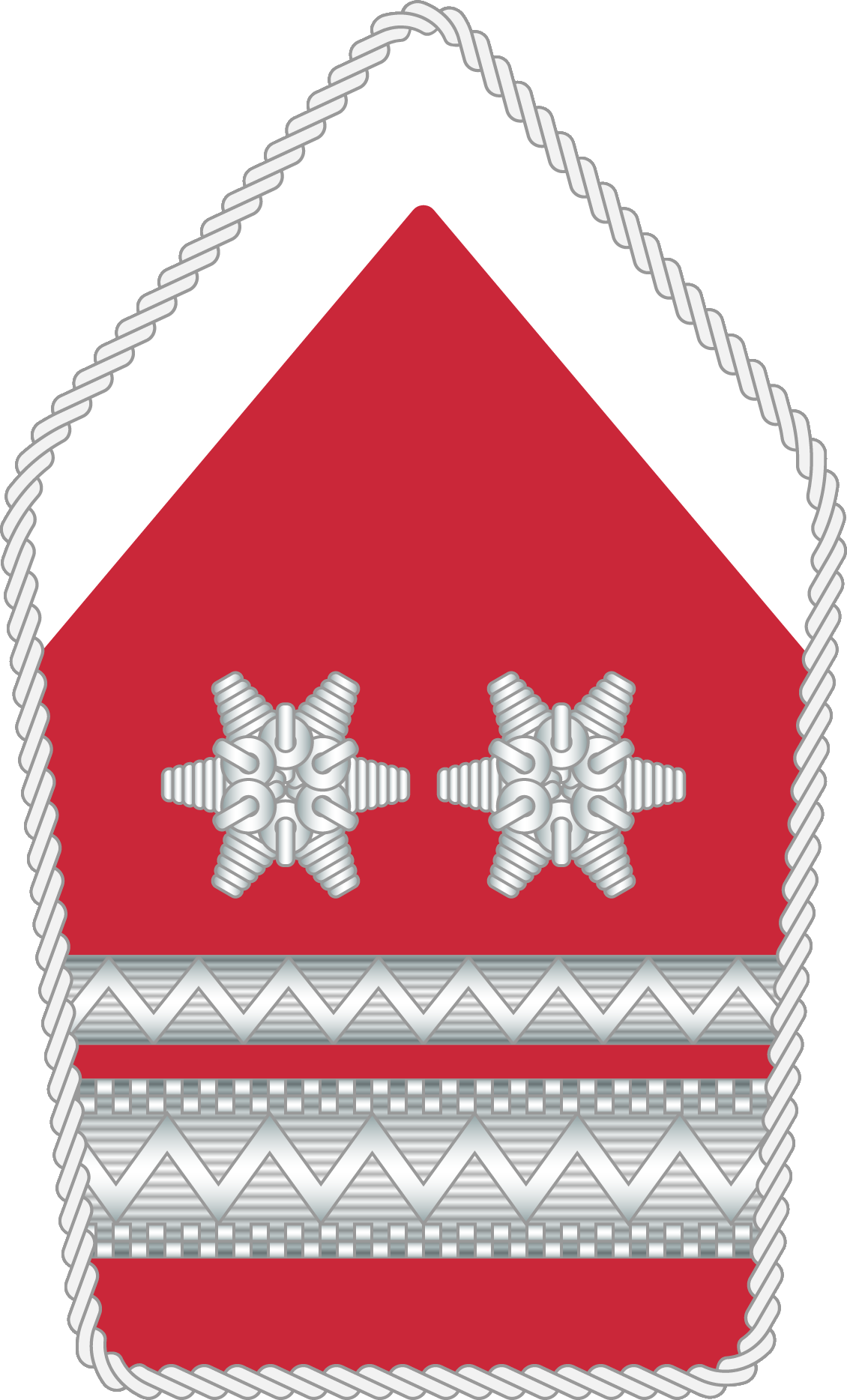
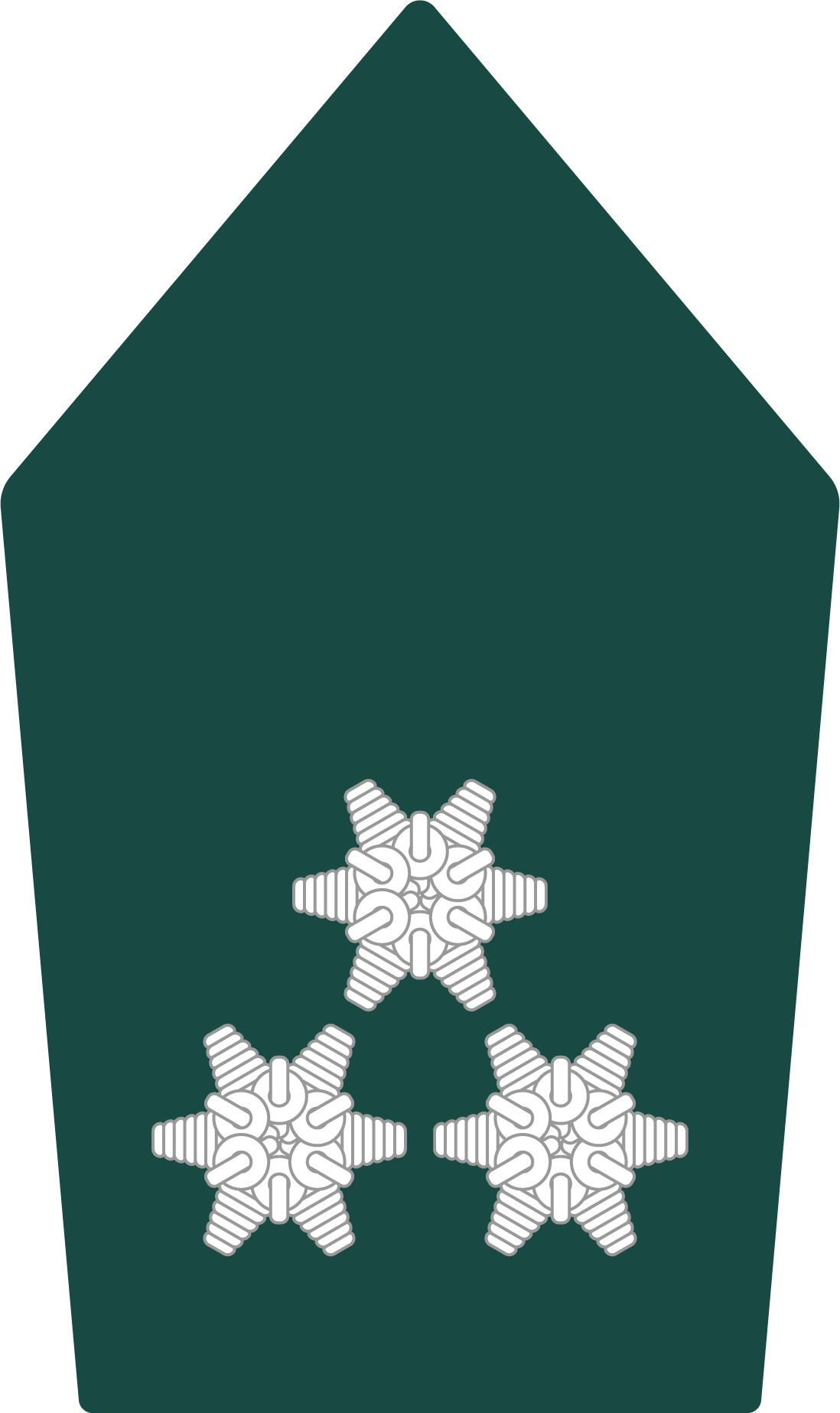
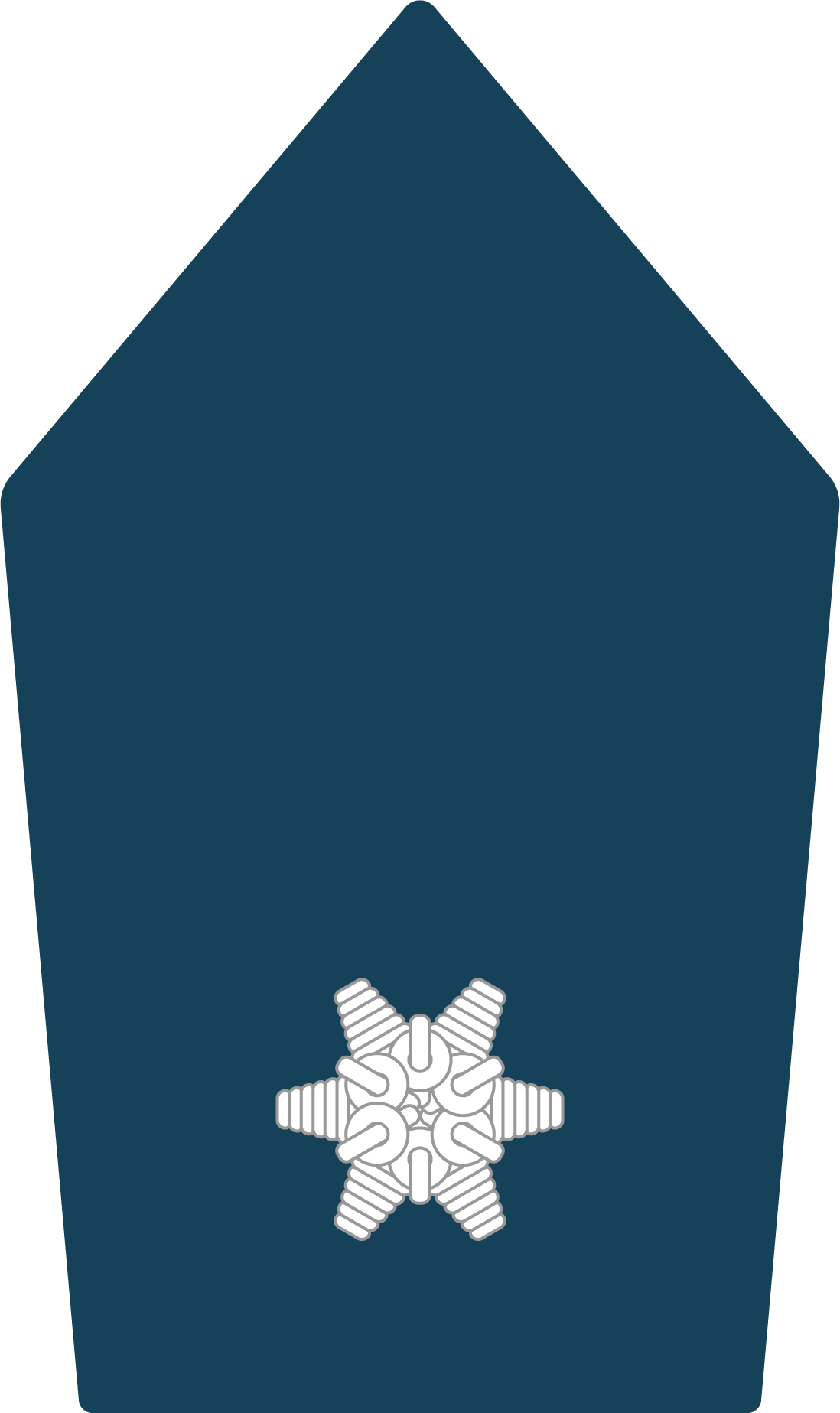
Rank group	Staff non-commissioned officer (Stabsunteroffizier)				Non-commissioned officer (Unteroffizier)		Enlisted ranks (Chargen)			Recruit (Rekrut)
Cap
Service uniform
Field uniform
	Vizeleutnant	Offiziersstellvertreter	Oberstabswachtmeister	Stabswachtmeister	Oberwachtmeister	Wachtmeister	Zugsführer	Korporal	Gefreiter	Rekrut
Official translation	Warrant officer I	Warrant officer II	Warrant officer III	Staff sergeant	Master sergeant	Sergeant	Master corporal	Corporal	Lance corporal	Private
Equivalent NATO code	OR-9		OR-8	OR-7	OR-6	OR-5	OR-4	OR-3	OR-2	OR-1

=== Special case military gymnasium ===
Pupils (German: Zöglinge) of the Military gymnasium wear black shoulder rank insignias on their dress uniform. On the duty suits black mounting loops have to be worn. However, the particular insignia has to be in line with actual school level. The appropriate school year is symbolised by a small golden strip.

== Possible appointments in correlation to rank or grade ==
Rank group	Military rank	Possible appointments/ assignments
Military staff (without any rank or grade)	Rekrut (Wehrmann until 1998)	Generic infantryman
Charges	Gefreiter	Generic infantryman
Charges	Korporal	Assistant squad leader
Charges	Zugsführer	Assistant squad leader
Unteroffiziere	Wachtmeister	Squad leader
Unteroffiziere	Oberwachtmeister	Squad leader
Stabsunteroffiziere	Stabswachtmeister	Squad leader (technical); Platoon leader
Stabsunteroffiziere	Oberstabswachtmeister	Squad leader (technical); Platoon leader
Stabsunteroffiziere	Offiziersstellvertreter	Platoon leader
Stabsunteroffiziere	Vizeleutnant	Platoon leader
Officers	Fähnrich	Military academy graduate and officer candidate (OA)
Officers	Leutnant	Platoon leader
Officers	Oberleutnant	Company executive officer
Officers	Hauptmann	Company commander
Officers	Major	Battalion commander (BN CDR); Headquarters company commander
Officers	Oberstleutnant	Battalion commander
Officers	Oberst	Regiment commander; Brigade commander
General officers	Brigadier	Brigade commander
General officers	Generalmajor (formerly Divisionär)	Chief of Staff in the Ministry of Defence; Chief of Operational Staff in the Ministry of Defence; Commanding general of the Air Force
General officers	Generalleutnant (formerly Korpskommandant)	Commanding general of the Operational Forces
General officers	General	Chief of the General Staff of the Austrian Bundesheer

=== Additions ===
To the rank or grade might be (among others) added addendums as follows.

Abbreviation	Long version
A	Arzt (en: physician)
aD	außer Dienst (off duty)
dG	des Generalstabsdienstes (of the general staff service)
dhmfD	des höheren militärfachlichen Dienstes (of the higher military specialised service)
dhmtD	des höheren militärtechnischen Dienstes (of the higher military technical service)
dIntD	des Intendanzdienstes (of the commissariat service)
dRes	der Reserve (of the reserve)
iR	in Ruhe (retired)

e.g.: MjrA (major physician), Lt aD (lieutenant off duty), ObstdG (colonel of the general staff service), HptmdhmtD (captain of the higher military technical service), ObstltdIntD (lieutenant colonel of the commissariat service), Olt dRes (first lieutenant of the reserve), Bgdr iR (general brigadier retired).

== Historic ranks ==
=== Commissioned officer ranks ===
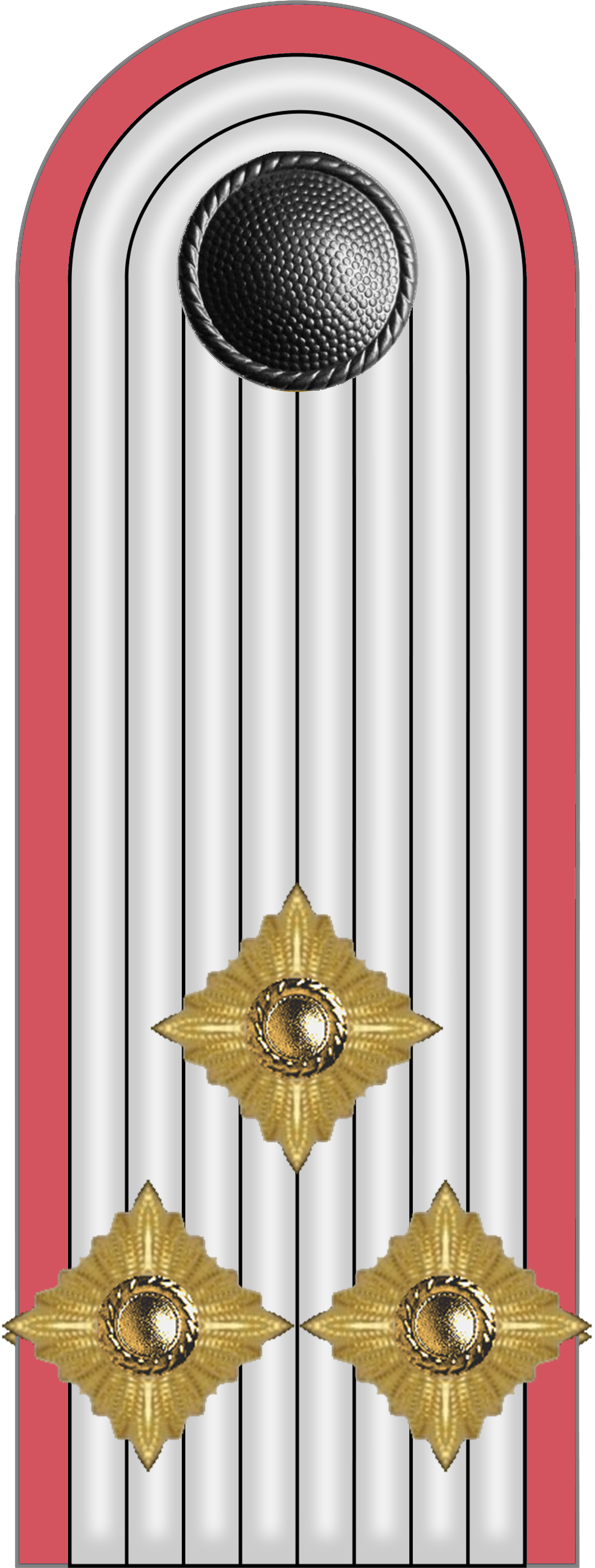
Rank group	General / flag officers			Senior officers			Junior officers
1918–1920
1918–1920	General der Waffengattung	Feldmarschall-Leutnant	Generalmajor	Oberst	Oberstleutnant	Major	Hauptmann/ Rittmeister		Oberleutnant	Leutnant	Fähnrich
1920–1923
1920–1923	General		Generalmajor (Note: Oberstbrigadier until 1923.)	Oberst	Oberstleutnant	Major	Hauptmann/ Rittmeister		Oberleutnant	Leutnant
1923–1933
1923–1933	General der Waffengattung (Note: General until 1929.)		Generalmajor	Oberst	Oberstleutnant	Major	Stabshauptmann/ Stabsrittmeister	Hauptmann/ Rittmeister	Oberleutnant	Leutnant	Fähnrich/ Vizeleutnant
1923–1933 (Air force)
1923–1933 (Air force)	General der Waffengattung		Generalmajor	Oberst	Oberstleutnant	Major	Hauptmann/ Rittmeister		Oberleutnant	Leutnant	Fähnrich/ Vizeleutnant
1933–1938
1933–1938	General der Waffengattung	Feldmarschall-Leutnant	Generalmajor	Oberst	Oberstleutnant	Major	Hauptmann/ Rittmeister		Oberleutnant	Leutnant

== See also ==
- Waffenfarbe (Austria)
- Rank insignia of the Austro-Hungarian armed forces
