= Vizeleutnant =

Austrian military rank

Vice lieutenant Vizeleutnant
- Peaked cap

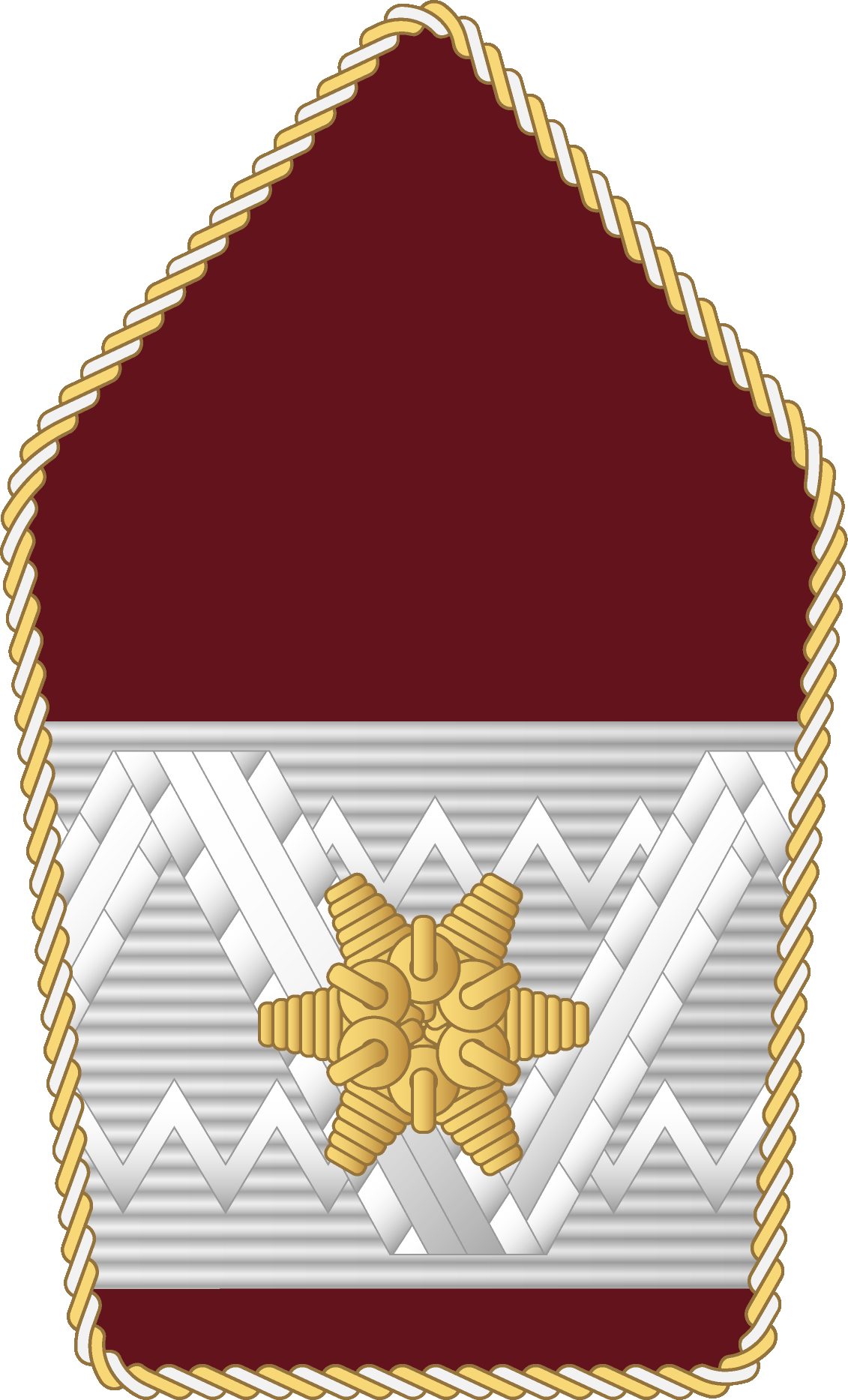
- Field uniform | service uniform
- Country: Austria
- Service branch: Austrian Armed Forces
- Abbreviation: Vzlt
- Rank group: Stabsunteroffizier
- Non-NATO rank: OR-9
- Formation: 1924
- Next higher rank: Fähnrich
- Next lower rank: Offiziersstellvertreter

Vizeleutnant (abbreviation Vzlt; transl. Vice lieutenant), is a rank of the higher non-commissioned officers NCO rank group (also rank group: Stabsunteroffiziere) in the Austrian Bundesheer. The rank was introduced first from 1924 to 1938 and reused from 1956 onwards. It is the highest Stabsunteroffizier rank.

In army / air force context NCOs of this rank were formally addressed as Herr/ Frau Vizeleutnant also informally / short Vize.

== See also ==
- Ranks of the Austrian Bundesheer
- Unterleutnant
