= Offiziersstellvertreter =

Austrian and former German military rank

Offiziersstellvertreter, short OStv (transl. Deputy officer), is a rank of the higher non-commissioned officers rank group (also staff NCO group) in the Austrian Armed Forces and Imperial German Army.

== Austria ==
Deputy officer Offiziersstellvertreter
- Peaked cap

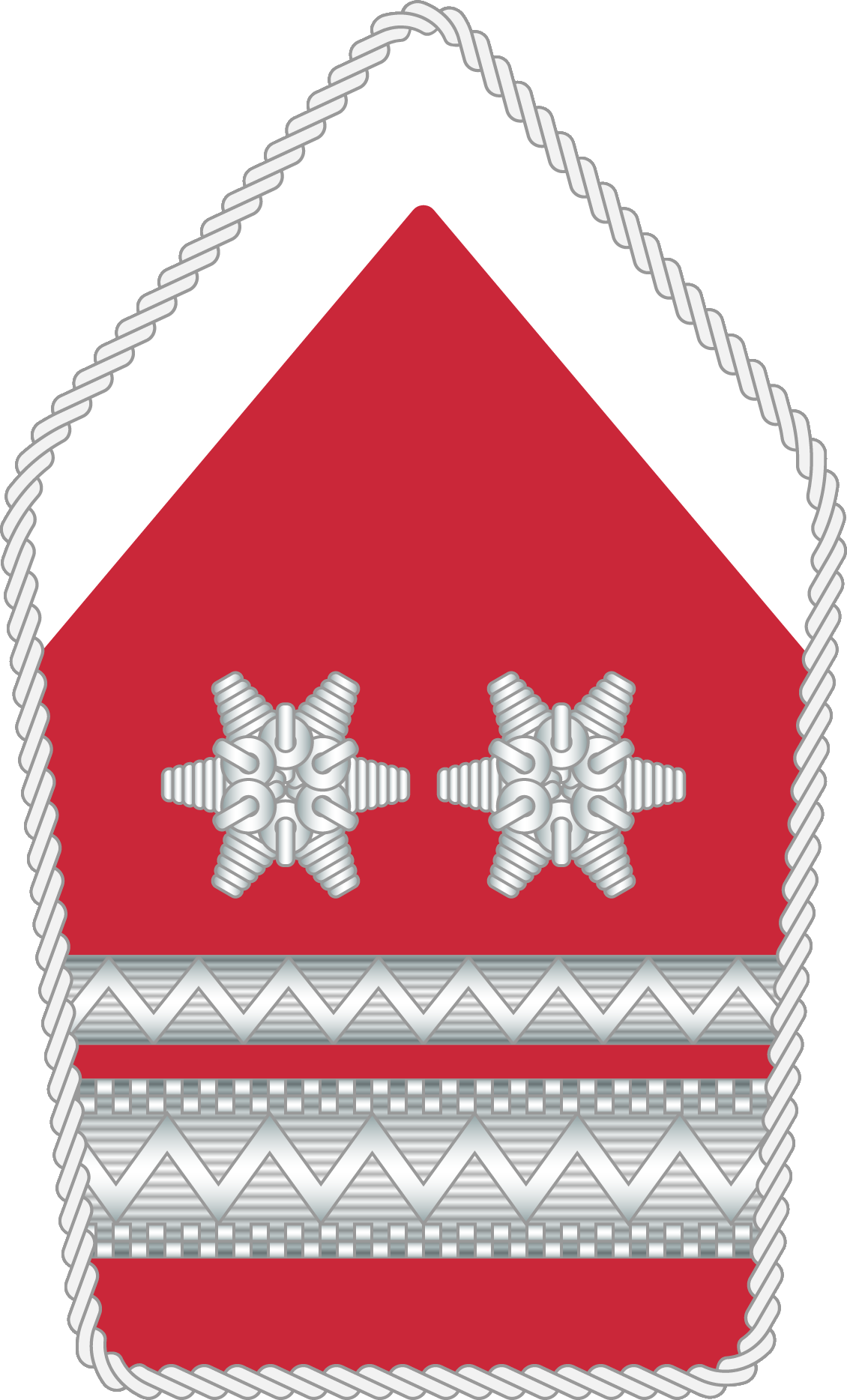
- Field uniform | service uniform
- Country: Austria
- Service branch: Austrian Armed Forces
- Abbreviation: Fhr
- Non-NATO rank: OR-8
- Formation: 1915
- Next higher rank: Vizeleutnant
- Next lower rank: Oberstabswachtmeister

=== Austria-Hungary ===
In 1915 the position Offiziersstellvertreter was introduced to the Austro-Hungarian armed forces, at the time being not as rank, but as an assignment. It was the intention to equalise the high number of World War I losses. Promoted were staff NCOs (Stabsfeldwebel, Stabswachtmeister, Stabsfeuerwerker, and/or Stabsoberjäger) who did have the appropriate rank at least for one month. Together with the staff NCOs the Offiziersstellvertreter formed the rank group of higher NCOs (de: higher Unteroffiziere).

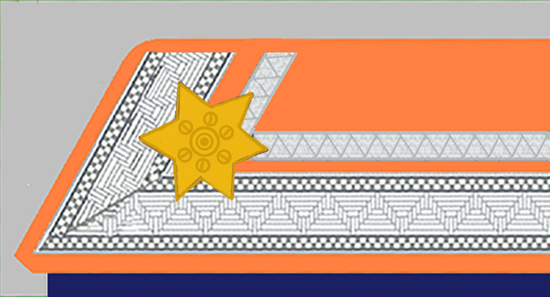
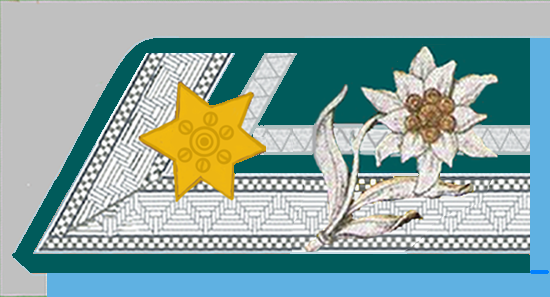
Designation	Offiziersstellvertreter
Paroli
Rank description	OStv	OStv
Branch	Infantry	Rifles

Junior Rank; Cadet	Austro-Hungarian armed forces rank Offiziersstellvertreter	Senior Rank; Fähnrich

== German Empire and Weimar Republic ==
The rank was created in the Imperial German Army in 1887.

== See also ==
- Ranks of the Austrian Bundesheer
- Rank insignia of the Austro-Hungarian Army
- Military ranks of the German Empire
- Military ranks of the Weimar Republic
