= Military ranks of the German Empire =

The military ranks of the German Empire were the ranks used by the military of the German Empire 1871–1918. It inherited the various traditions and military ranks of its constituent states.

== Ranks of the Imperial German Army ==
=== Officer corps ===
Critics long believed that the Army's officer corps was heavily dominated by Junker aristocrats, so that commoners were shunted into low-prestige branches, such as the heavy artillery or supply. However, by the 1890s, the top ranks were opened to highly talented commoners.

The rank insignia of commissioned officers.

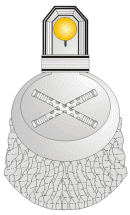
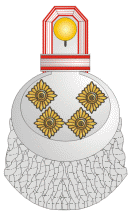
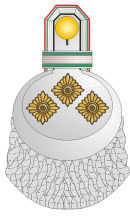
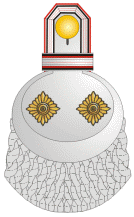
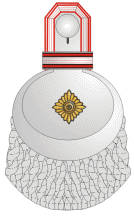
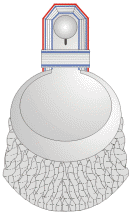
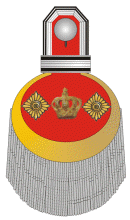
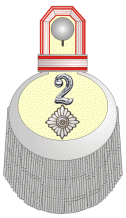
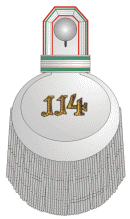
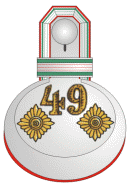
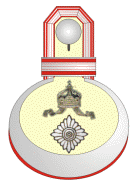
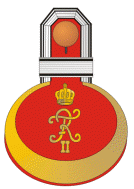
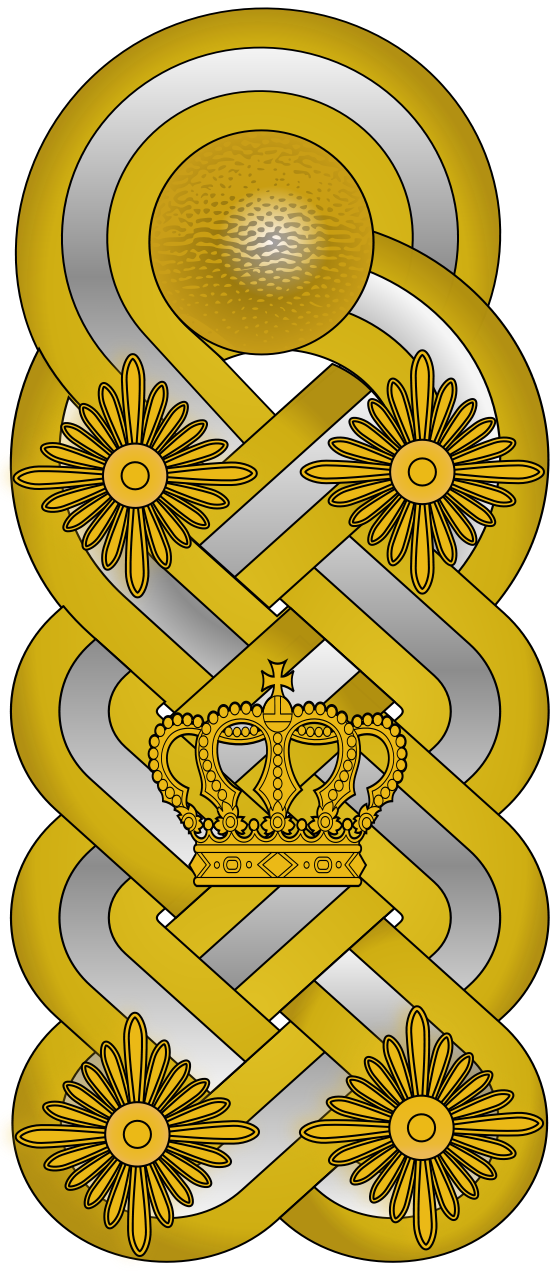
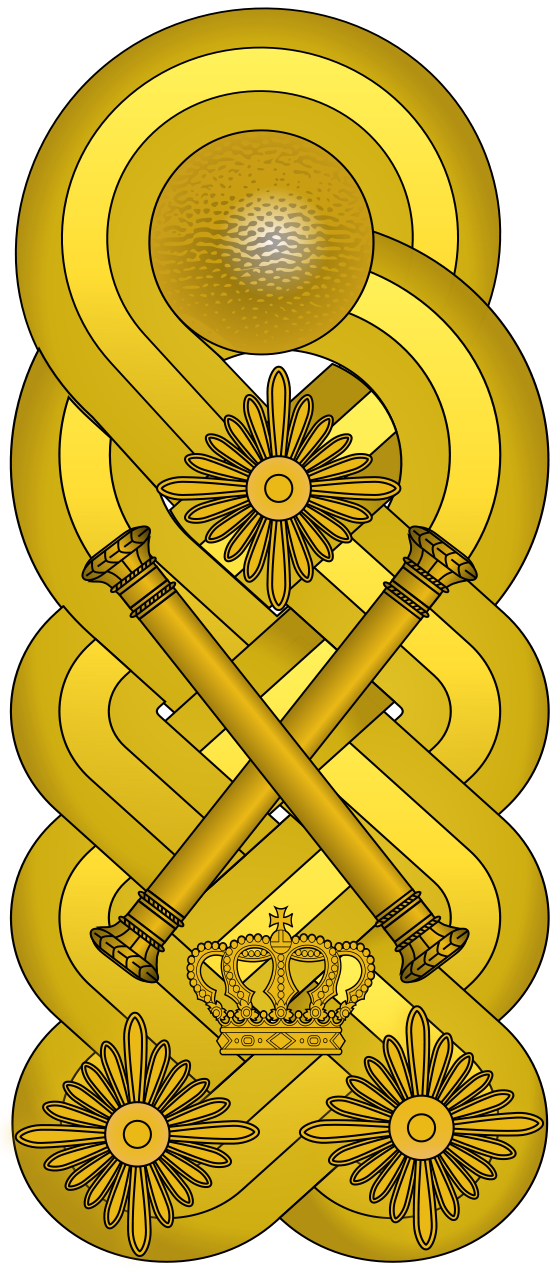
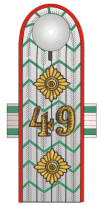
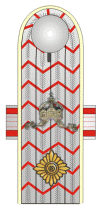
Rank group	General / flag officers						Senior officers			Junior officers
Epaulette (Full dress uniform)
Shoulder board (Waffenrock)
	Generalfeldmarschall	Generaloberst (im Rang des Generalfeldmarschall)	Generaloberst	General der Waffengattung	Generalleutnant	Generalmajor	Oberst	Oberstleutnant	Major	Hauptmann/ Rittmeister (Note: Several German armies and national contingents, including Prussia and Bavaria, traditionally used two different captain ranks that originated with the ownership of units. The Captain 1st Class was either the proprietor who had raised and equipped the Company / Troop / Battery or was a gentleman or nobleman who had bought a commission as its nominal Captain. The Captain 2nd Class (or Stabshauptmann > "Staff Captain") was its actual commander. By the end of the 19th century that dual-system had been gradually phased out and replaced by a single rank.)	Oberleutnant	Leutnant

=== Warrant officers and officer cadets ===
- Cadet (Fahnenjunker, ranking between Sergeant and Vizefeldwebel) – served as cadets in the various military academies and schools. After graduation, they became a Fähnrich.
- Ensign (Fähnrich, ranking between Vize-Feldwebel and Feldwebel) A probationary officer waiting to become a 2nd Lieutenant (Leutnant).
- Deputy Officer (Offizierstellvertreter, ranking above Etatmäßiger Feldwebel) A warrant officer usually used as a brevet Leutnant or an acting platoon leader.
- Uncommissioned Lieutenant (Feldwebelleutnant, a reserve rank for promoted sergeants serving as a junior 2nd Lieutenant with Lieutenant's pay, but without an officer's commission.) They wore an officer's dress sword (degen) rather than an NCO's dagger, and wore the rank insignia of a Vizefeldwebel on the collar with second lieutenant's shoulder straps. Still a member of the NCO's Mess until 1917, when he became eligible for the Officer's Mess.

=== Non-commissioned officers / Unteroffiziere ===
Rank group	Unteroffizier mit Portepee		Unteroffizier ohne Portepee	
Collar (portepee, sleeve braid)				
Title	etatmäßiger Feldwebel	Vizefeldwebel	Sergeant	Unteroffizier
Cavalry/ Artillery	etatmäßiger Wachtmeister	Vizewachtmeister	Sergeant	Unteroffizier

- Unteroffizier mit Portepee ("Non-Commissioned Officer with Sword Knot"). Senior NCOs with the right to wear a ceremonial lanyard tied to the hilt of their NCO service dagger.
  - Etatmäßiger Feldwebel ("Budgetary Sergeant Major") A company's senior NCO. They were equivalent to a British Company Sergeant Major or an American First Sergeant.
  - Vizefeldwebel ("Assistant Sergeant Major") A platoon's senior NCO. They were equivalent to a British Sergeant.
- Unteroffizier ohne Portepee ("Non-Commissioned Officer without Sword Knot"). Junior NCOs who did not have the right to wear the sword knot.
  - Sergeant A junior NCO who leads a section, equivalent to a British Lance-Sergeant.
  - Unteroffizier ("Subordinate Officer") A junior NCO who leads a section. They were equivalent to a British Corporal.

=== Enlisted (Mannschaften/Gemeine) ranks ===
Rank group	Enlisted				
Collar					
Epaulette					
Title	Kapitulant	Einjährig-freiwilliger	Obergefreiter	Gefreiter	Soldat
English designation	Capitulant	One-Year Volunteer Enlistee	Senior Lance Corporal	Lance Corporal	Private

- Musketeer (Musketier, Prussian army infantry regiments), Infantryman (Infanterist, Bavarian army infantry regiments), Soldier (Soldat, Saxon army infantry regiments), Gunner (Kanonier, foot artillery), Pioneer (Pionier, pioneer branch). Other unit-specific enlisted ranks were: Fusilier (Füsilier), Grenadier (Grenadier), Huntsman otherwise Light-Infantryman (Jäger), Dragoon (Dragoner), Hussar (Husar), Cuirassier (Kürassier), Uhlan (Ulan), Fusilier Guard (Garde-Füsilier), Grenadier Guard (Garde-Grenadier), Wehrmann (Landwehr), etc.
- Lance Corporal (Gefreiter); up until 1918 the only rank (with exception of Obergefreiter in the foot artillery) to which a conscripted soldier could be promoted. The rank was a deputy rank to the Corporal (Unteroffizier) (Note: Duden; Origin and meaning of "Korporal", in German.) rank.
- Senior Lance Corporal (Obergefreiter); established in the Prussian Army from 1846 to 1853, reestablished in 1859, then in foot artillery only, replacing the artillery Bombardier rank that had been introduced in 1730.

Additionally, the following voluntary enlistees were distinguished:

- One-Year Volunteer Enlistee (Einjährig-Freiwilliger): despite the name, one-year volunteers were actually conscripts who served a short-term form of active military service, open for enlistees up to the age of 25. Such enlisted soldiers were usually high school graduates (Matura, Abitur), who would opt to serve a one-year term rather than the regular two or three-year conscription term, with free selection of their chosen military service branch and unit, but throughout were obligated to equip and subsist themselves at entirely their own cost. In today's monetary value, this could at bare minimum cost some 10,000 euro, which purposely reserved this path open to sons from mostly affluent social class families wishing to pursue the Reserve-Officer path; it was the specific intention of Wilhelm II that such Reserve-Officer career path should only be open to members of so-called "officer-material" social classes. On absolving their primary recruit training, those aspiring to become Reserve-Officers would have to qualify and achieve suitability for promotion to the Gefreiter rank and then would continue to receive further specialized instruction until the end of their one-year term, usually attaining and leaving as surplus Corporals (überzählige Unteroffiziere) (Reservists), with the opportunity to advance further as reservists. Enlistees who did not aspire to officer grade would leave at the end of their one-year term as Gemeine (Note: Duden; Definition of "Gemeine", in German.) (Ordinary soldier) enlisted rank (for example Musketier or Infanterist) and a six-year reserve duty obligation. Eligibility for this specific one-year path of military service was a privilege approved upon examining the enlistee's suitability and academic qualifications.
- Long-Term Volunteer Enlistee "Capitulant" (Kapitulant): enlisted soldiers who had already absolved their regular two or three-year military conscription term and had now volunteered to continue serving for further terms, minimum was 4 years, generally up to 12 years. (Note: Duden; Definition of "Kapitulant", in German.)

Note: Einjährig-Freiwilliger and Kapitulant were not ranks as such during this specific period of use, but voluntary military enlistee designations. They, however, wore a specific uniform distinction (twisted wool piping along their shoulder epaulette edging for Einjährig-Freiwilliger, the Kapitulant a narrow band across their lower shoulder epaulette) in the colours of their respective nation state. This distinction was never removed throughout their military service nor during any rank grade advancements.

== Naval ranks and ratings ==
The Imperial German Navy's rank and rating system combined that of Prussia's with the navies of other northern states.

=== Commissioned officer ranks ===
The rank insignia of commissioned officers.

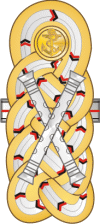
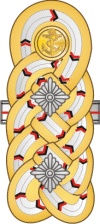
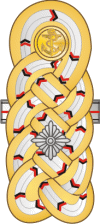
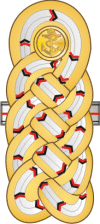
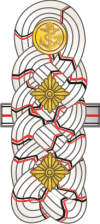
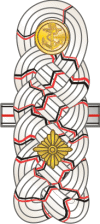
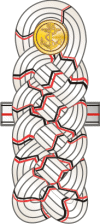
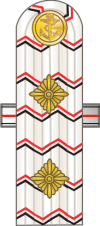
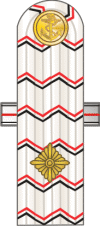
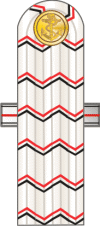
Rank group	General / flag officers				Senior officers			Junior officers
Shoulder board
Sleeve insignia
Sleeve insignia	Großadmiral	Admiral	Vizeadmiral	Konteradmiral	Kapitän zur See/ Kommodore	Fregattenkapitän	Korvettenkapitän	Kapitänleutnant	Oberleutnant zur See	Leutnant zur See

==== Rank flags ====
Title	Großadmiral	Admiral	Vizeadmiral	Konteradmiral
Command flag				

=== Officer cadets ===
Officer training ranks
Title	Oberfähnrich zur See	Fähnrich zur See	Seekadett
Epaulette			
Sleeve			
English designation	Midshipman	Sea cadet	Junior sea cadet

=== Warrant officers ===
Warrant officers
Title	Deckoffiziere als Offizier-Stellvertreter	Oberdeckoffizier	Deckoffizier
Shoulder			
English designation	Chief Warrant Officer as Acting Commissioned Officer.	Chief Warrant Officer	Warrant Officer
Specialty designations	Offizier-Stellvertreter	Oberbootsmann; Obersteuermann; Oberfeuerwerker	Bootsmann; Steuermann; Feuerwerker
English designation	Acting Commissioned Officer	Chief Boatswain; Chief Helmsman; Chief Artificer	Boatswain; Helmsman; Artificer

=== Petty officers ===
Senior Petty Officers			Junior Petty Officers	
Title	Feldwebel	Vize-Feldwebel	Obermaat	Maat
Sleeve				
English designation	Chief Petty Officer 1st Class (with additional stripe around the sleeve)	Chief Petty Officer	Petty Officer 1st Class (Chief Mate)	Petty Officer (Mate)

=== Seamen ===
Seamen
Title	Obermatrose	Einjährig-Freiwilliger	Matrose
Sleeve			
English designation	Seaman 1st Class	Seaman Volunteer (i.e.: Reserve Officer Candidate)	Seaman

== Bibliography ==
- Bunkley, Joel William (1918). Military and Naval Recognition Book: A Handbook on the Organization, Uniforms and Insignia of Rank of the World's Armed Forces (2nd ed.). New York: D. Van Nostrand Company.
- Williams, Dion (1918). "XI: Uniforms and Insignia of Foreign Armies and Navies". Army and Navy Uniforms and Insignia. New York, N.Y.: Frederick A. Stokes Company. pp. 216–292.
