= Conscription in the Russian Empire =

Conscription in the Russian Empire was introduced by Peter I of Russia. The system was called "conscript obligation" (Russian: рекрутская повинность).

== Prior to 18th century ==
Russian tsars before Peter maintained professional hereditary musketeer corps (streltsy in Russian) that were highly unreliable and undisciplined. In times of war the armed forces were augmented by feudal cavalry and peasant levies. Peter I introduced a modern regular army built on the German model, but with a new aspect: officers were not necessarily drawn solely from the nobility, but included talented commoners. This new class of officers might eventually be given a noble title upon attaining a certain rank. Conscription of peasants and townspeople was based on settlement and district quotas. Initially these were based on the number of households, later on the population numbers.

== 18th century to Napoleonic Wars ==
The term of service during the 18th century was for life. In 1793 it was reduced to 25 years. Individual conscripts were drawn from urban and rural males of Russian nationality who paid poll-tax (including serfs), upon reaching the age of twenty. Because of the large population pool available, exemptions were common with the decisions largely being left to the village elders of each community. The final stage in the selection process involved the drawing of names by lot, according to the actual requirements of the army in any given year. This might mean that virtually no recruits would be required in years where the Empire was at peace and the limited replacements required could be met through the voluntary re-enlistment of veterans nearing the end of their period of conscription. Alternatively, in the critical French invasion year of 1812 three separate levies were needed, calling up a total of fifteen males from every hundred available.

== 1825 to Milyutin reforms ==
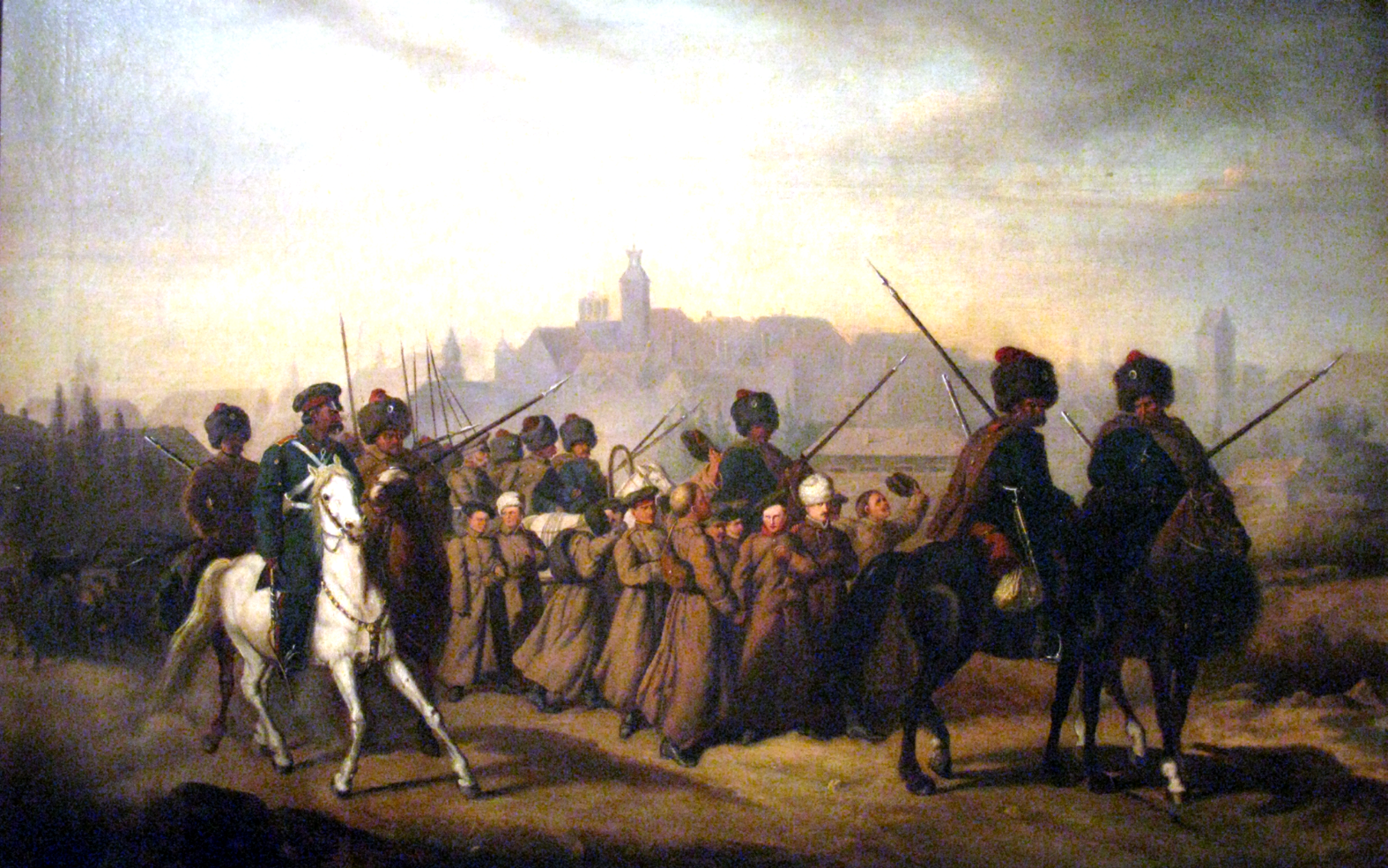
Conscription of Poles to the Russian Army in 1863

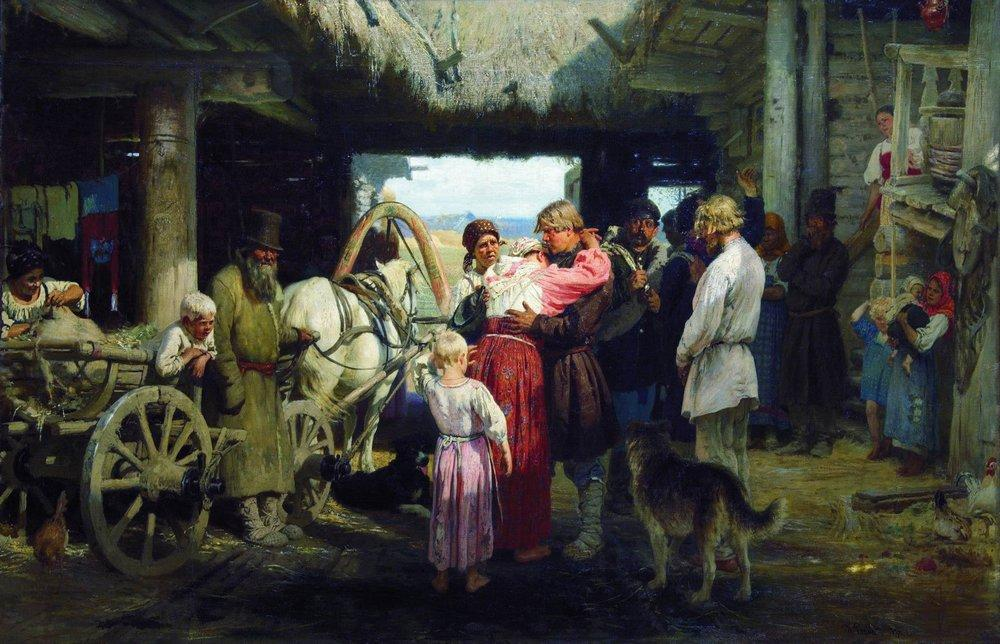
Seeing off a rekrut, by Ilya Repin, 1879

In 1825 the duration of active service remained at 25 years for line regiments, with shorter periods of 22 years for the Imperial Guard and 15 in support and technical corps. In 1834 it was reduced to 20 years plus 5 years in the reserve and in 1855 to 12 years plus 3 years of reserve commitment. Following the 1834 changes depot battalions were established in recruiting districts for each regiment to enable basic training for conscripts. Allocation to a particular corps was on the basis of build and appearance (regiments of the Imperial Guard), education (literate conscripts became clerks or went to the technical branches), and skills (lighter men with equine experience went to the cavalry). The great mass of conscripted recruits were allocated to the line infantry. At least in peacetime this system of arbitrary allocation was to continue until the end of the Russian Empire with no provision being made for individual preferences.

After the Russian defeat in the Crimean War during the reign of Alexander II, the Minister of War Dmitry Milyutin introduced sweeping proposals for military reform, with draft provisions presented in 1862. As part of these reforms, in 1856, a conscription statute was approved by the tsar making military service theoretically compulsory for all males at the age 20. The period of service was reduced to 6 years full-time plus 9 years in the reserve. This conscription measure created a large pool of military reserves ready to be mobilized in the event of war, while permitting a smaller active army during peacetime. Prior to the Milyutin reforms the Russian army had effectively been a long-service force with limited reserves, since many men who had completed their 25 years of service would not be physically fit for active service if recalled to the colours.

The six years of service "with the colours" required of Russian conscripts after 1874 was modified by a general practice of allowing individuals to take extended leave for the last twenty-four months of their obligation for active duty. Once released from full-time service, a former conscript was still liable to be recalled to help bring a regular unit up to full strength in the event of general mobilization or to replace casualty losses. After six years with the reserve his commitment was reduced to service with a behind-the-lines garrison unit, unlikely to see actual battle.

Families with only one son were exempted from conscription.

== Final years of the Empire ==
Following the Russo-Japanese War major attempts were made at military reform, including the extension of the conscription system to enlarge the pool of trained reservists. The conscription system as evolved during 1910–1914 set call-up liability at the age of 21 with a commitment for active and reserve service that lasted until 43. Service "with the colours" varied from three years for infantry and artillery, to four years for cavalry, engineers and support corps. The individual conscript would then pass into the "First Reserve" for seven years and the "Second Reserve" for eight years.

As had been the case since the 18th century, the commitment for conscription fell primarily on subjects of Russian nationality. Muslims and Finns were exempted, although the former were required to pay a special tax and the latter were enlisted in a separate corps of Finnish regiments with no commitment to serve outside their homeland. About half of potential Russian conscripts were able to obtain exemption for a variety of personal reasons, although they might be required to serve with the militia upon the general mobilization of the regular army. A continuing weakness in the Russian system was a shortage of long-service volunteers to provide career NCOs. Cossacks served under a complex and semi-feudal conscription system of their own and "Alien" cavalry units were recruited as volunteers from Muslim tribal groups in the southern regions of the Russian Empire.

== See also ==
- Cantonists
- Conscription in Russia
