= Wehrmann =

Wehrmann is a German habitational surname for someone from any of various places called Wehr, Wehre, or Wehren. Notable people with the name include:

- Hans Wehrmann (born 1964), German entrepreneur, economist, inventor and author of literature in scientific management
- Henry Wehrmann (19th century), American engraver
- Jan Wehrmann (born 1969), German former professional footballer
- Jasey Wehrmann (born 2004), Dutch professional footballer
- Jordy Wehrmann (born 1999), Dutch professional footballer
