= Charges (military) =

Charge(s) (German: Charge(n); literal: rank(s)) used to be the generic term to the military ranks above the rank group of enlisted personnel in German speaking armies. In the today's Austrian Armed Forces (Österreichisches Bundesheer) it is the designation to the rank group OR2 (Note: The abbreviation "OR" stands for "Other Ranks / French: sous-officiers et militaires du rang / Russian: другие ранги, кроме офицероф, romanized: drugiye rangi, krome ofitserof") to OR4, which comprises the ranks Gefreiter, Korporal and Zugsführer.

In English speaking armed forces, however, charge characterizes a particular manoeuvre, where soldiers rush towards the enemy to engage in close combat.

Charges in the Austrian Bundesheer

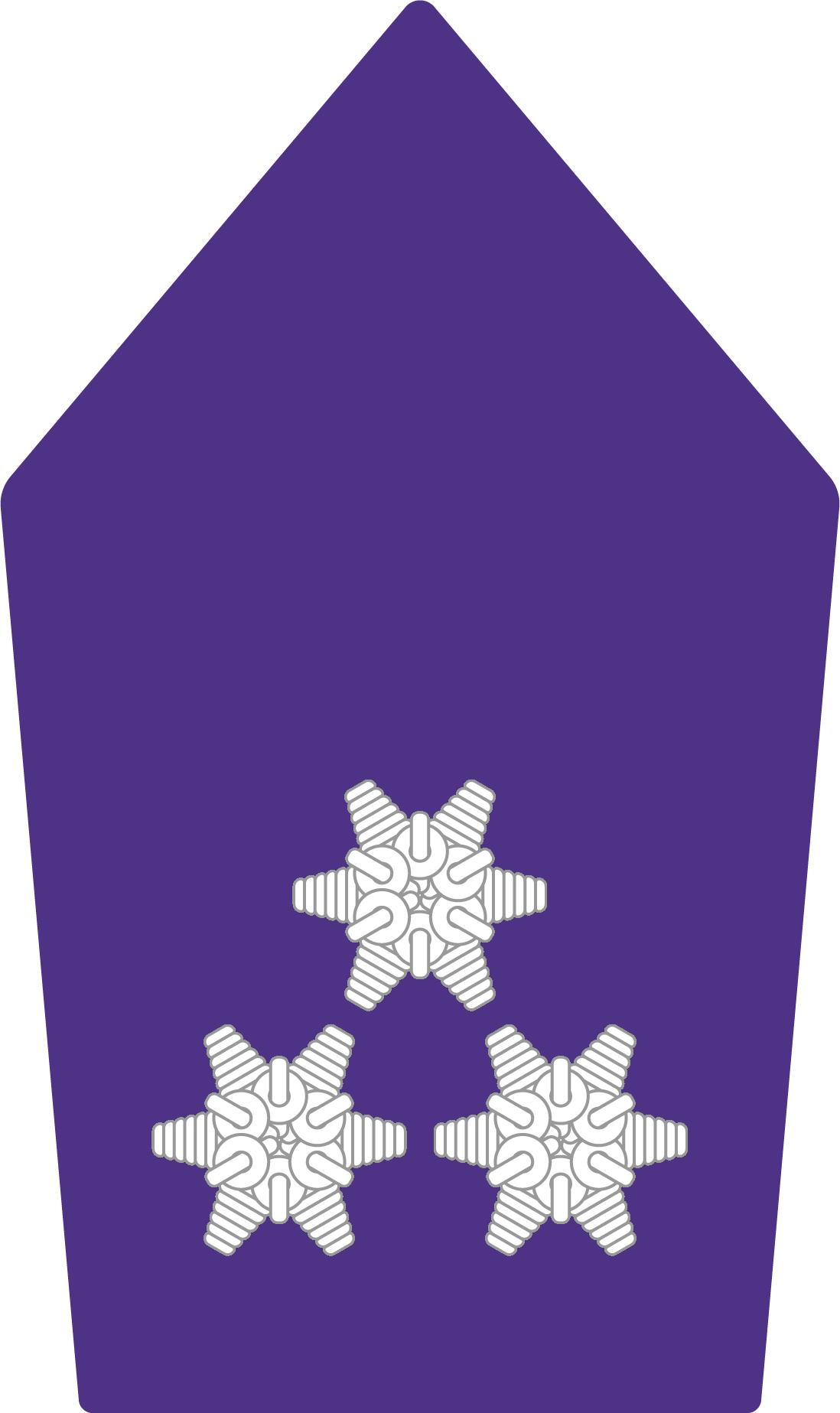
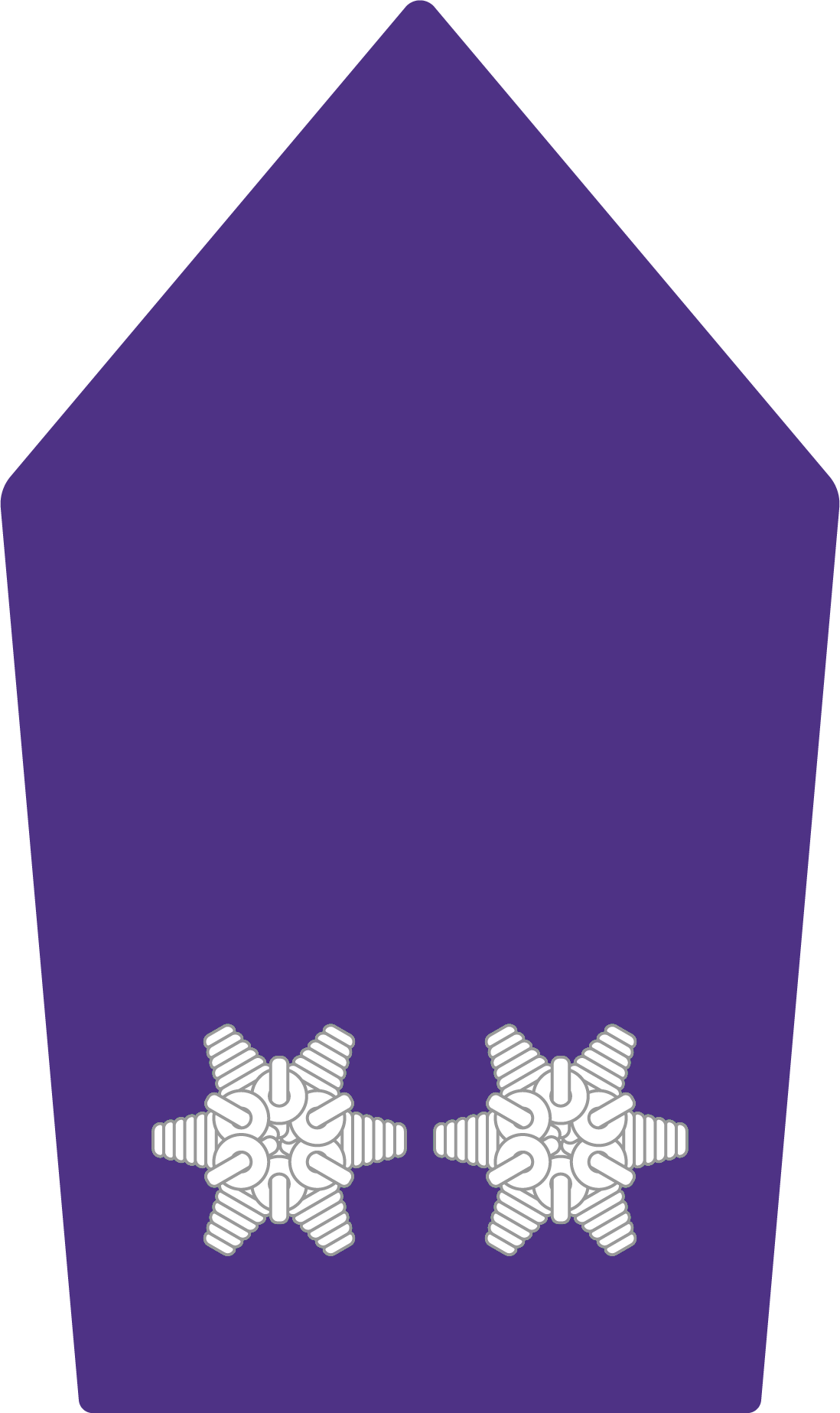
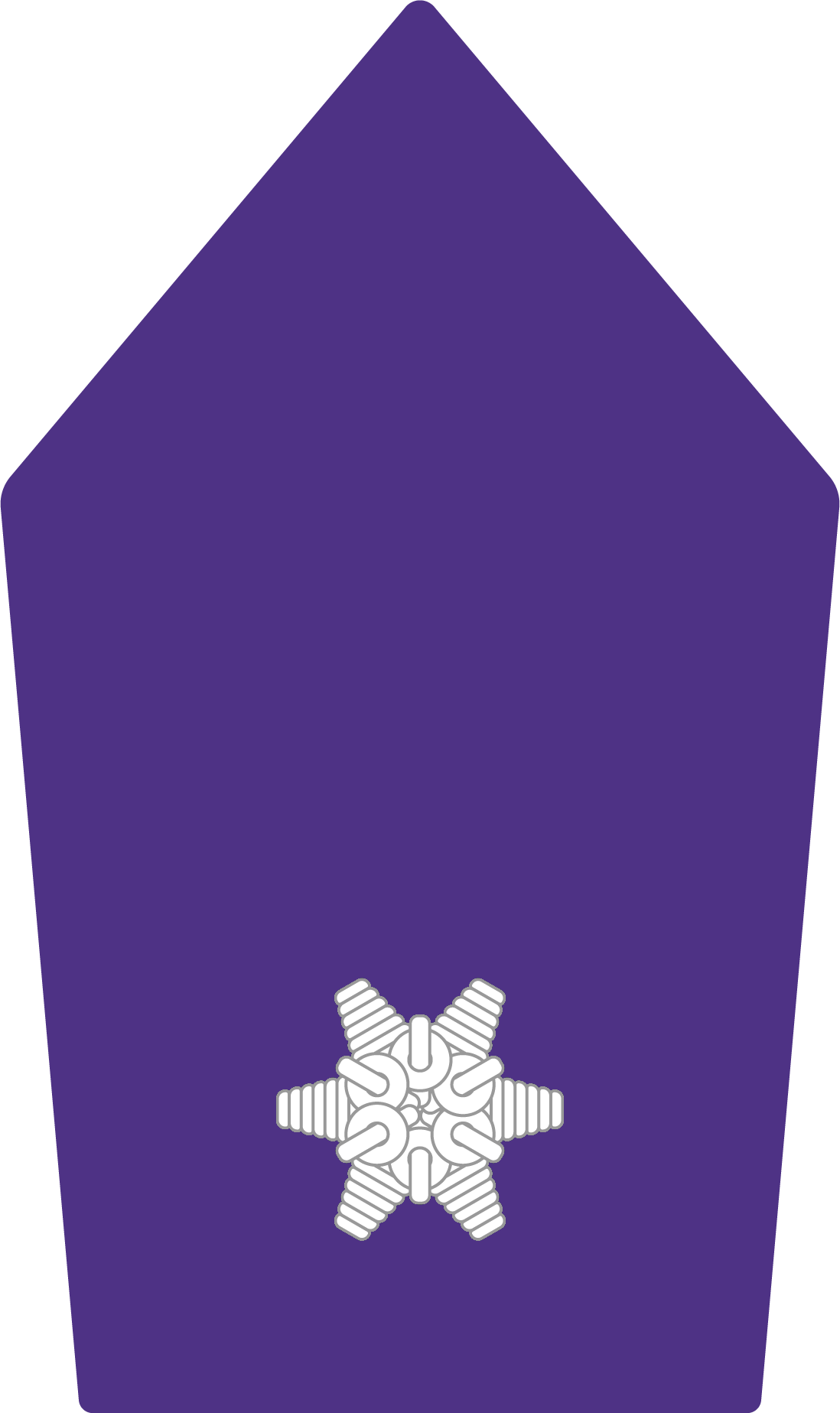
Designation	Ranks (Chargen)
Peaked cap (Tellerkappe)
Suit (Anzug) 75 / 03
Jacket gorget (Rockkragen)
Corps colour (Waffenfarbe)	Engineers	Skirmishing patrol, Army sports	NBC-Defence	Air Force
Rank	Zugsführer (Zgf)	Korporal (Kpl)	Gefreiter (Gfr)	Zugsführer (Zgf)	Korporal (Kpl)	Gefreiter (Gfr)
NATO equivalent	Master Corporal	Corporal	Private
rank	OR-4	OR-3	OR-2	OR-4	OR-3	OR-2

The sequence of rank groups (top-down approach) in the Austrian Bundesheer is as follows:

- Personen ohne Chargengrad OR-1 (= Persons without charge grade)
- Chargen OR2–OR4 (= Charges)
- Unteroffiziere OR5–OR6 (= NCOs)
- Stabsunteroffiziere OR7–OR9 (= Staff NCOs)
- Offiziere OF1–OF5 (= Officers)
- Generale OF6–OF9 (= General officers)

See also
