= Rekrut =

Newly recruited soldiers in German-speaking countries

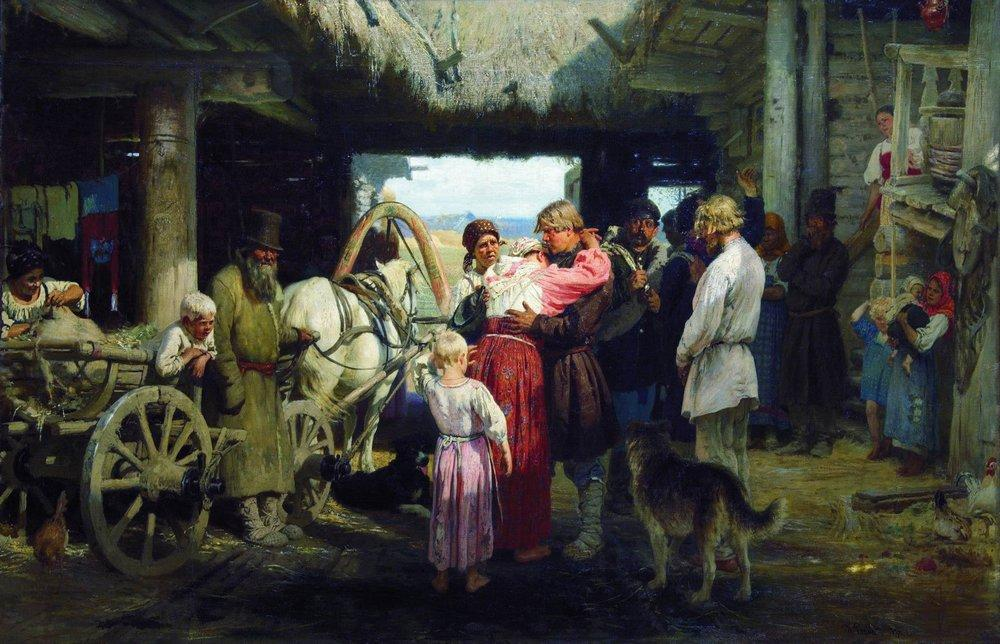
Seeing off a Rekrut (Russian: Рекрут), by Ilya Repin (1879)

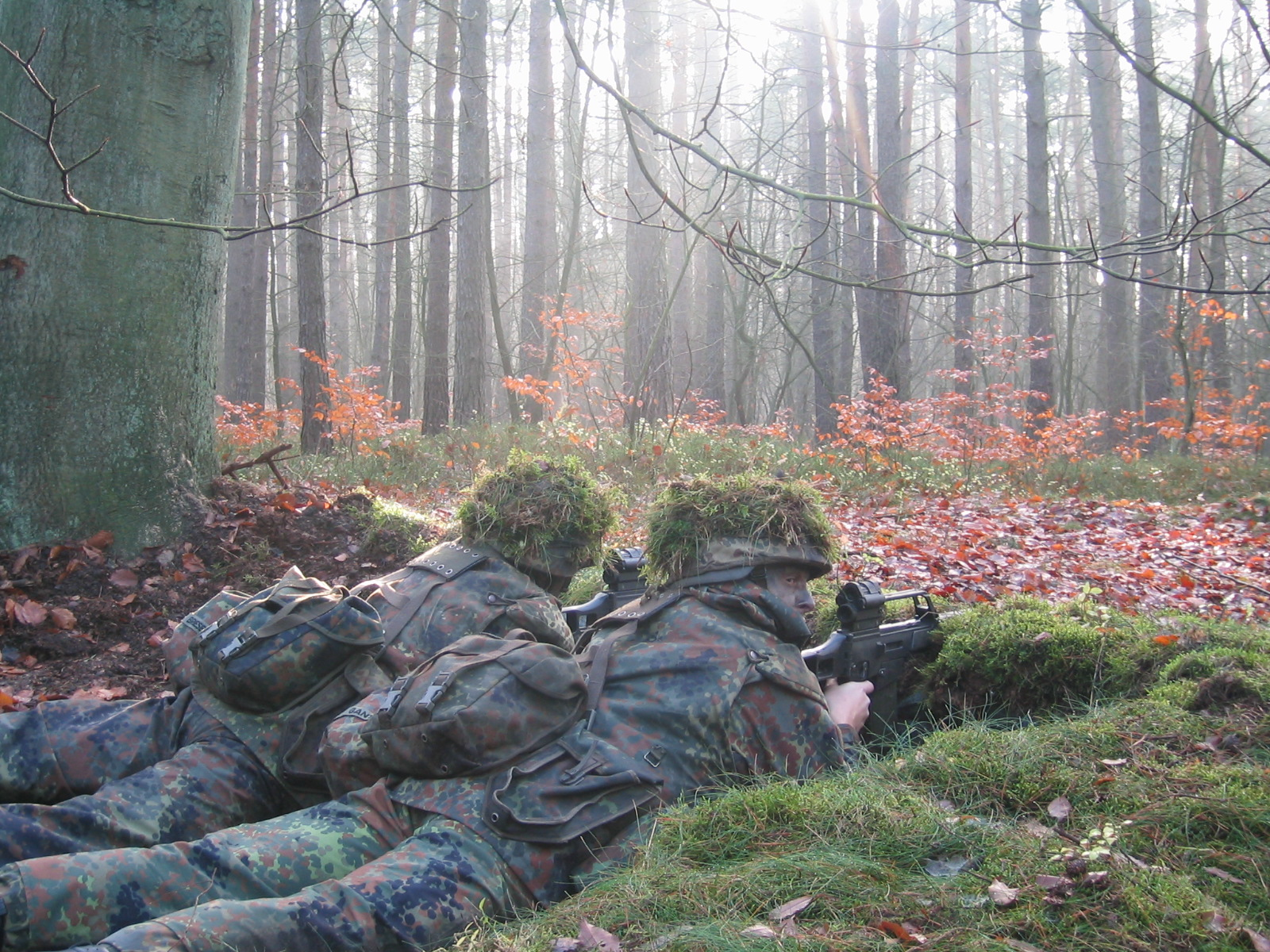
German Rekruts on outpost

Rekrut (German for 'recruit') is a military designation in German-speaking countries. It was also used historically in the 18th- and 19th-century Russian Empire (see Conscription in the Russian Empire). In Germany, it characterizes newly recruited or sought personnel during an initial period of basic military training. However, in Austria, Switzerland, and some other countries, Rekrut is the lowest rank of enlisted soldier.

== Etymology ==
Rekrut was derived from the French recruter (to seek new soldiers), and recrue (recruit). The noun entered the German language in the 17th century.

== Austria ==
Rekrut
- Peaked cap

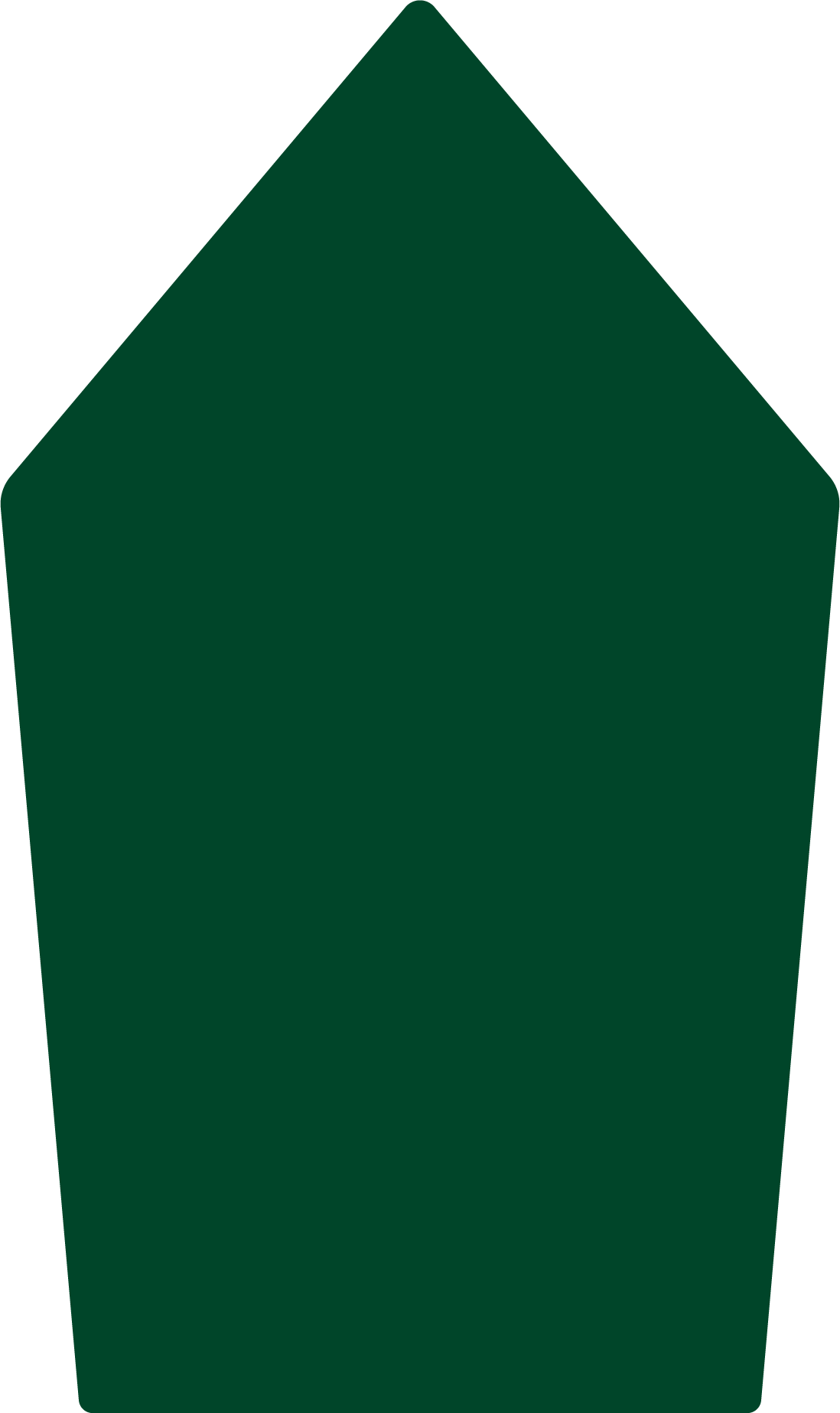
- Field uniform | service uniform
- Country: Austria
- Service branch: Austrian Armed Forces
- Abbreviation: Rekr
- Rank group: Personnel without charges (Enlisted rank)
- Non-NATO rank: OR-1
- Formation: 1998
- Next higher rank: Gefreiter

In the Austrian Bundesheer, Rekrut (known as Wehrmann, 'defense man', until 1998) is the lowest rank in the Heer and Luftwaffe. It belongs to the so-called Rekruten rank group.

== Germany ==
In the German Bundeswehr, Rekrut is the generic term for military personnel during basic training. In most cases it refers to the lowest rank of enlisted men, e.g. a Soldat of the German Army, Flieger of the German Air Force, or Matrose of the German Navy.

== Switzerland ==
Rekrut in Switzerland

| No rank insignia |

Rank insignia
Swiss army
Rank group
Enlisted men (de: Mannschaften)
Army / Air Force
Rekrut
Salary bracket
CHF 4.-/Day
Lower:
Higher:
Not established
Soldat

In the Swiss Armed Forces, Rekrut (abbreviated Rek) is the lowest rank in the Heer and Luftwaffe. However, it is also the generic term for newly recruited military personnel during basic training.
