= Military ranks of East Germany =

The Ranks of the National People's Army were the military insignia used by the National People's Army, the armed forces of the German Democratic Republic, from 1956 to 1990.

== Design ==
The design of the rank insignias followed the tradition of the German Army (Heer) with some modifications. For example, the cuff titles (chevron insignias) of the Gefreiter were replaced by Soviet-styled shoulder straps with cross-stripes.

=== Shoulder strap rank insignias ===
Commissioned officer ranks up to Oberst featured four-pointed golden stars in increasing number according to seniority, and arranged following the Soviet pattern.

Junior officer (lieutenant and captain ranks) shoulder straps were made of silver satin string (German: Silberplattschnur). Unterleutnant had a single golden star, Leutnant two side-by-side stars, and Oberleutnant three stars in a triangle. Hauptmann rank had a fourth star above the triangular formation.

Senior officer shoulder straps were twisted silver cords, Major had a single star, Oberstleutnant two stars, and Oberst three stars, again arranged following the Soviet example.

Generals wore twisted golden and silver cords with five-pointed stars numbering from one (Generalmajor) to four (Armeegeneral).

== Ground forces, Air force, and Border troops ==
Remark: The different colours represent the appropriate service, branch, branch of service, or special troop.

=== General and Officer ranks ===
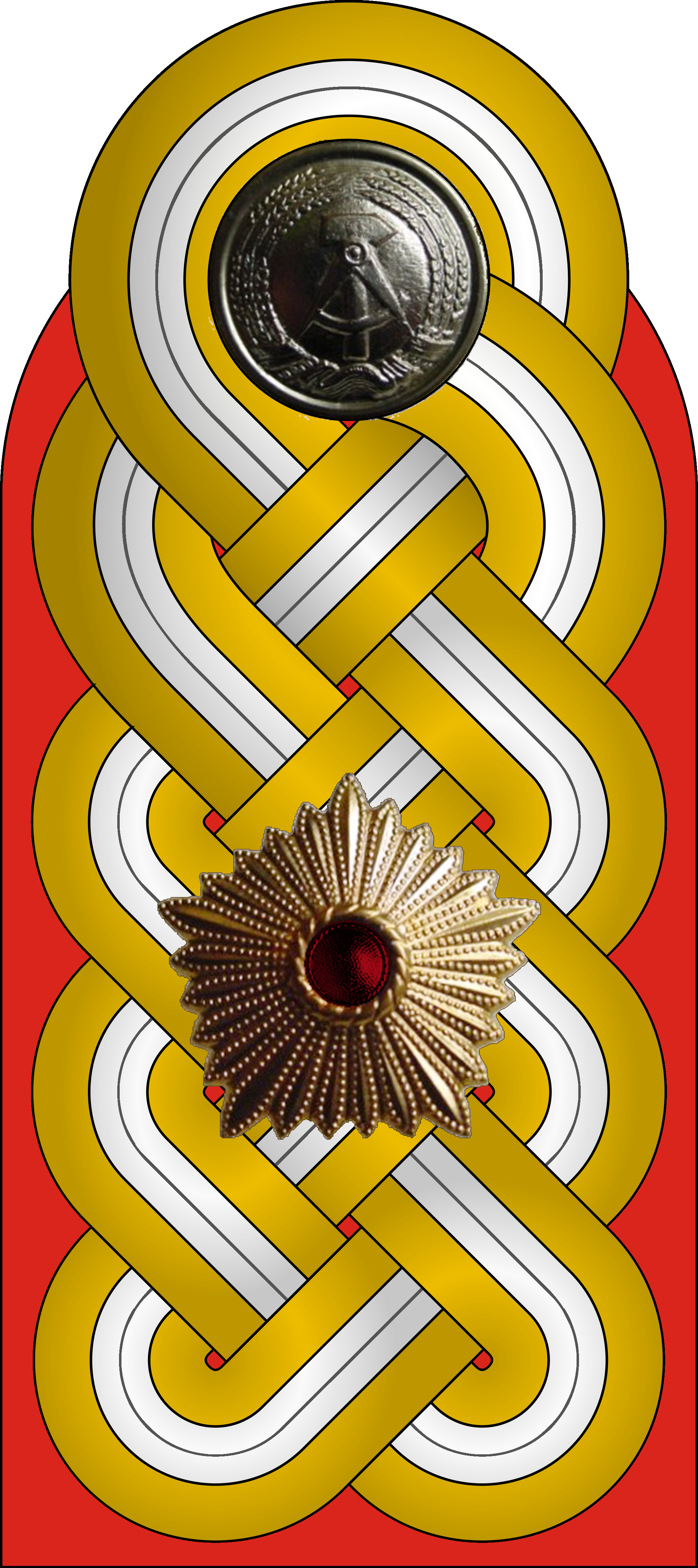
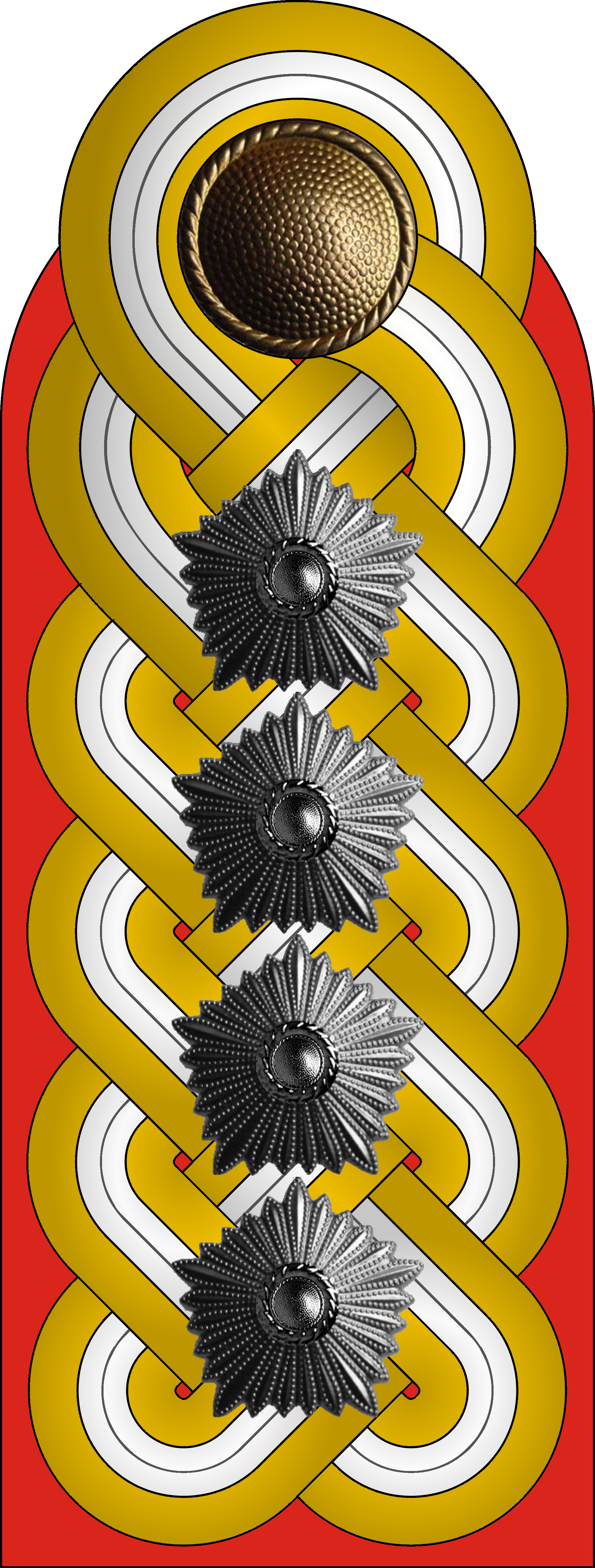
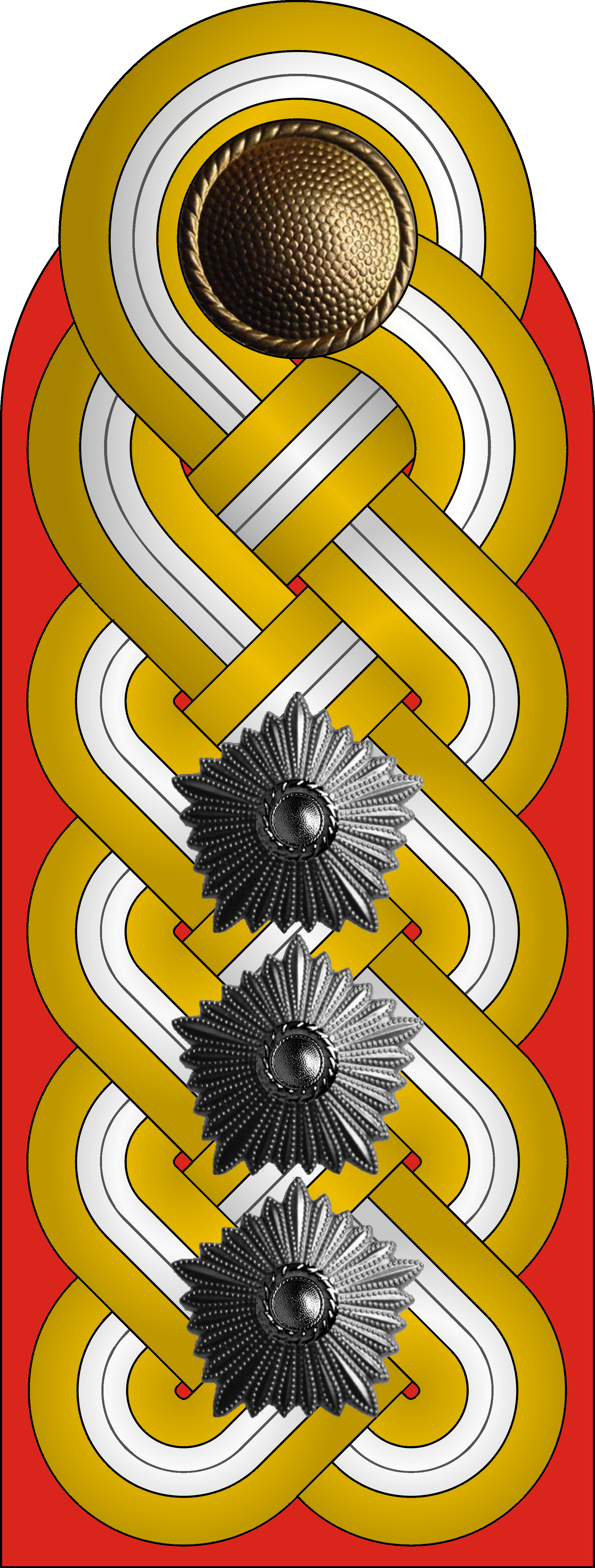
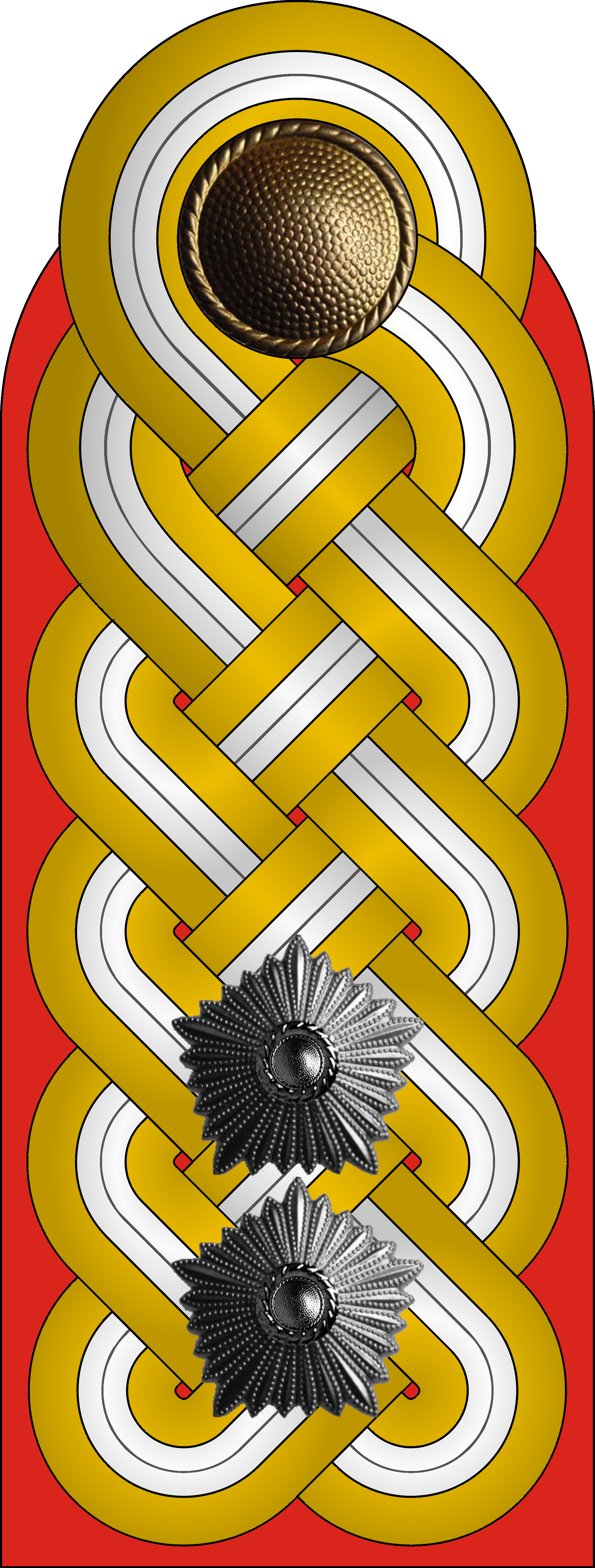
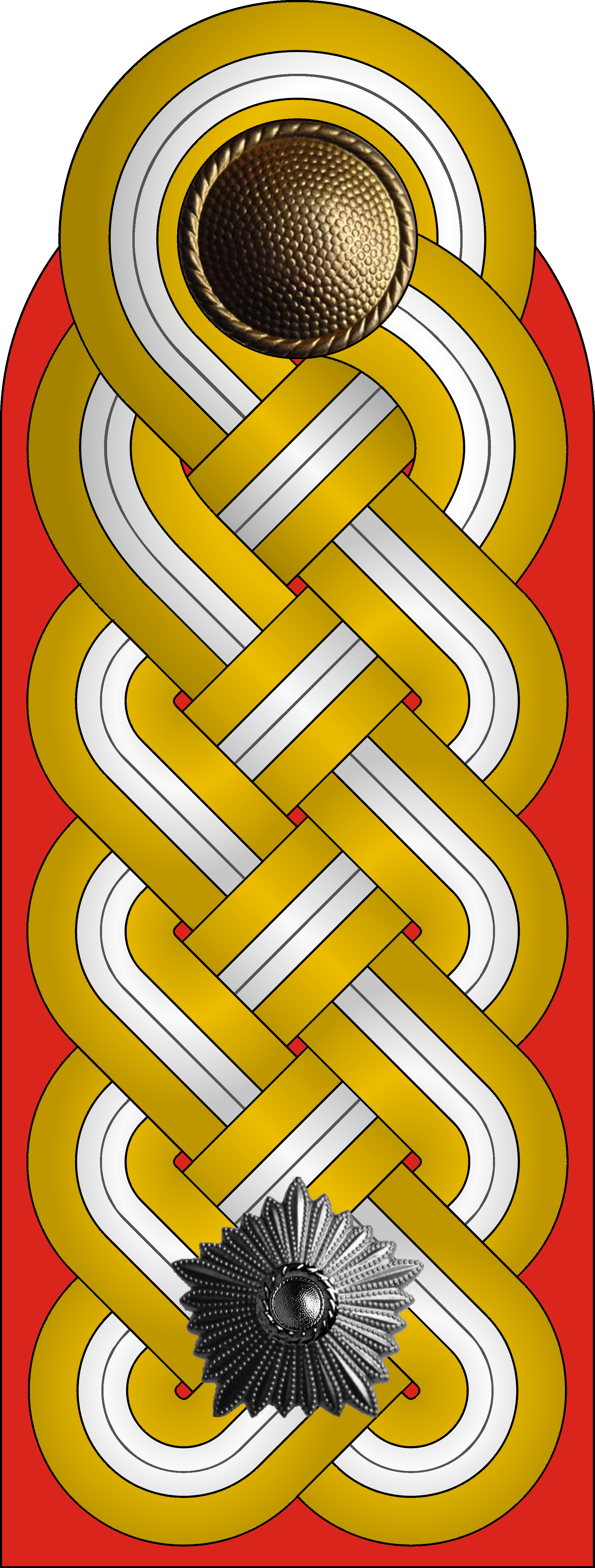
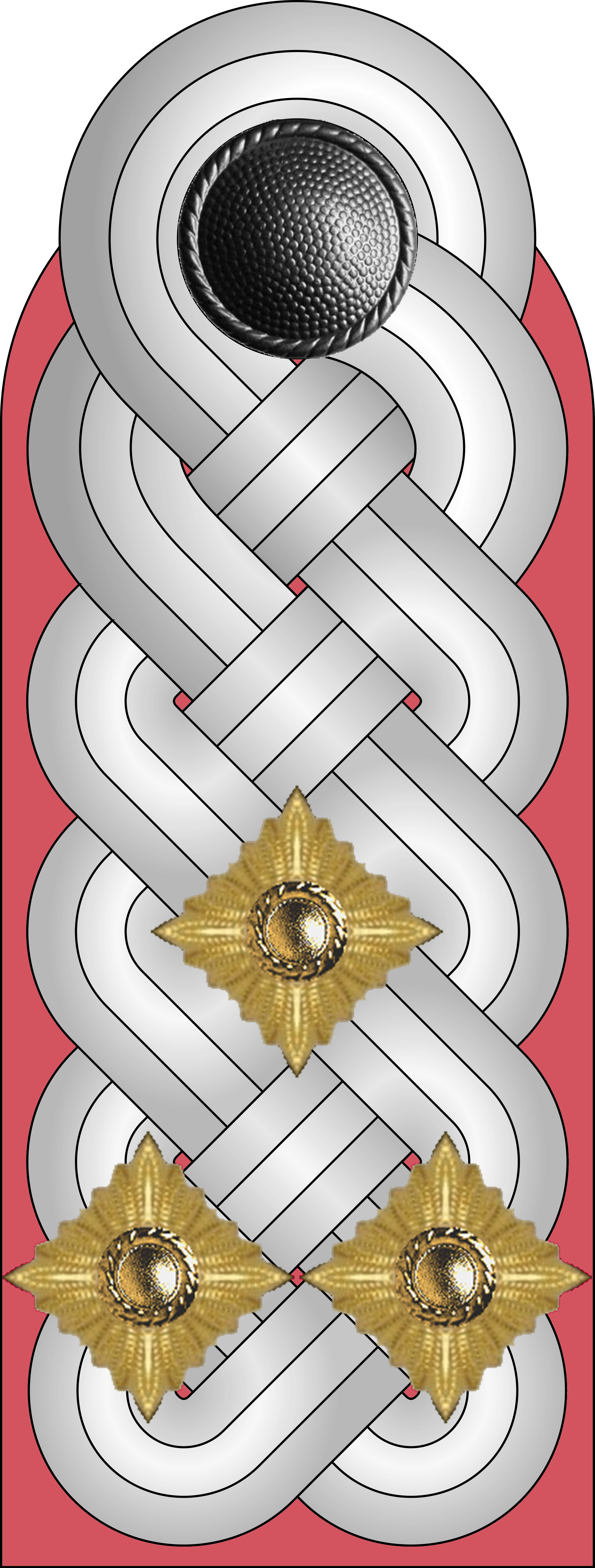
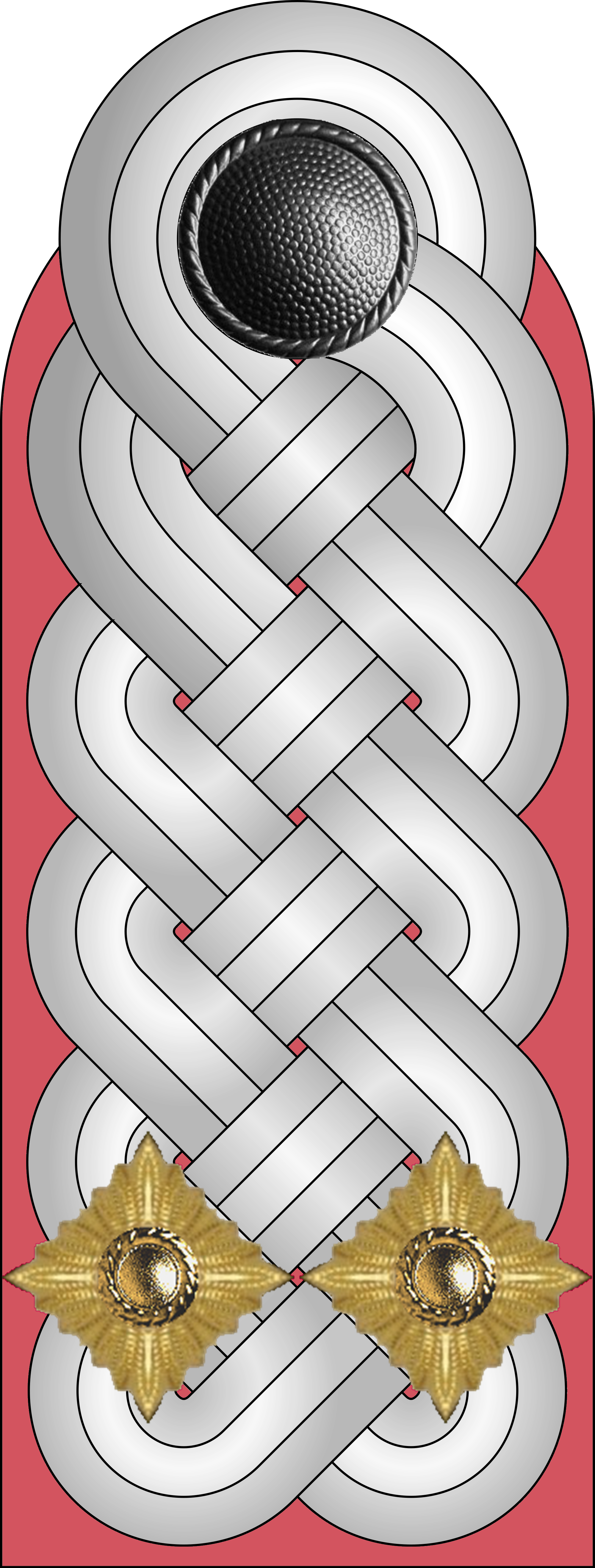
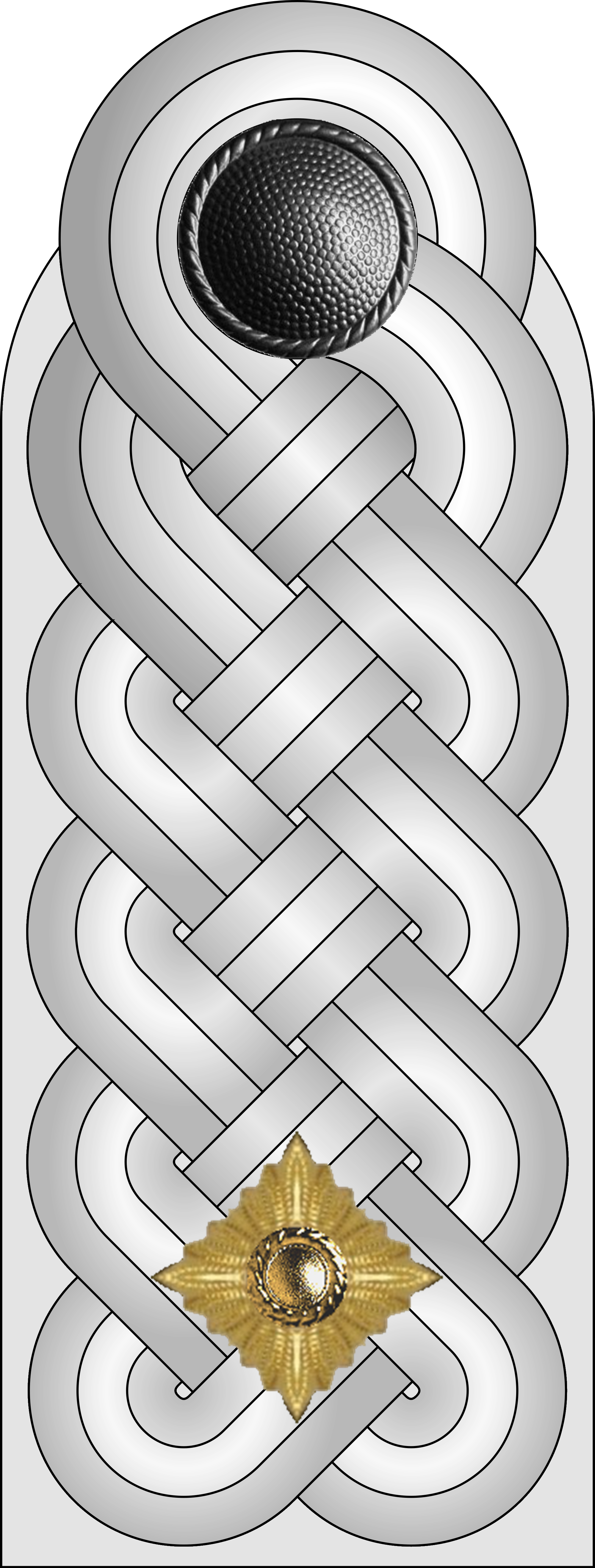
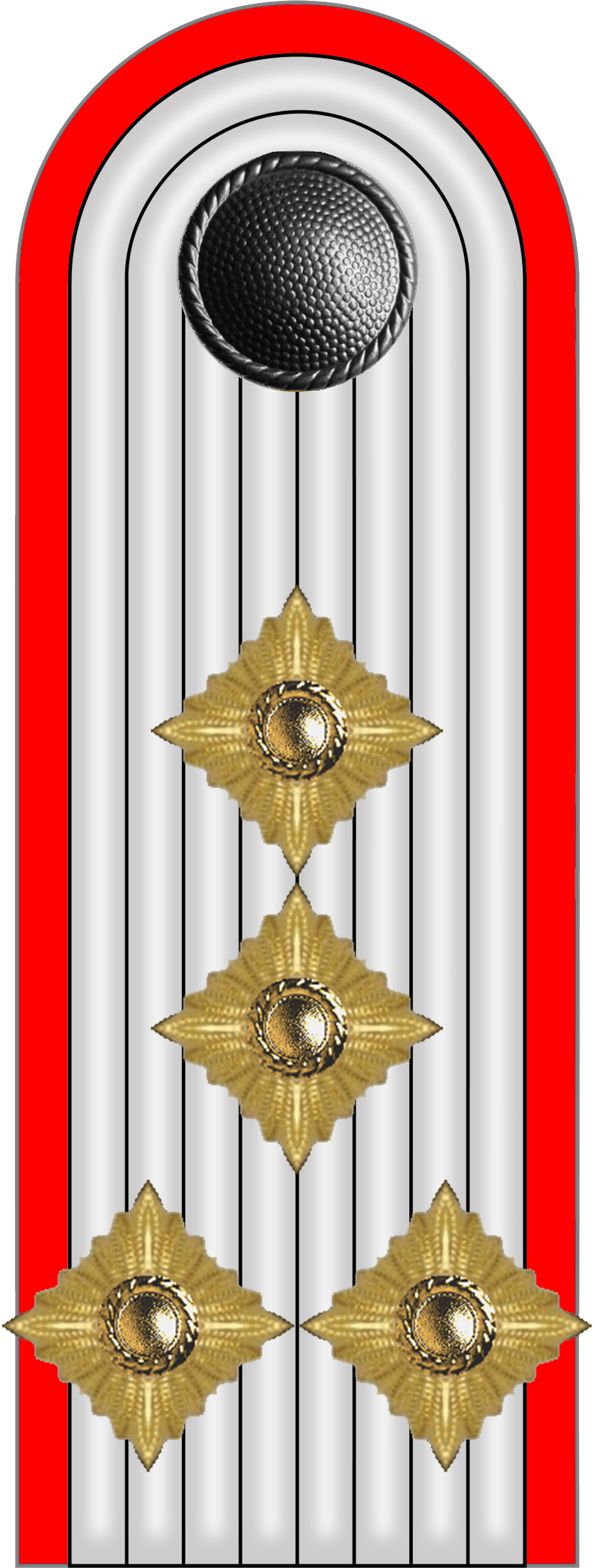
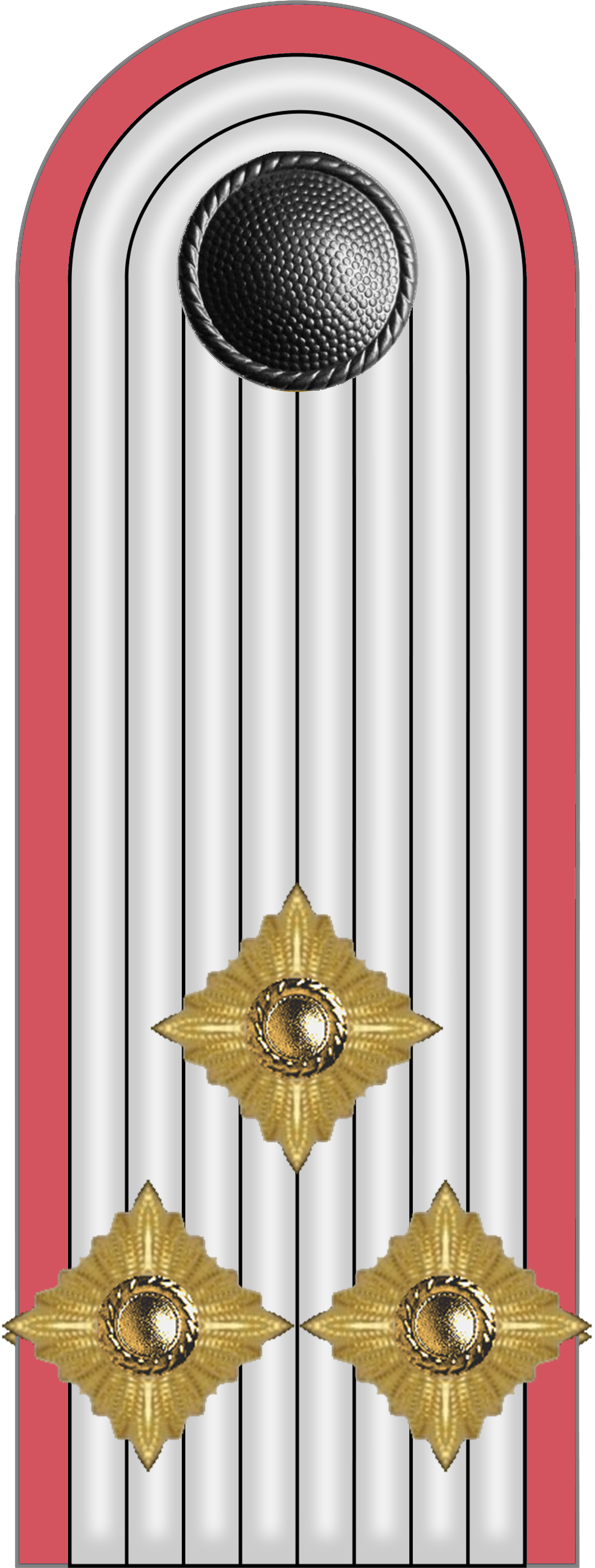
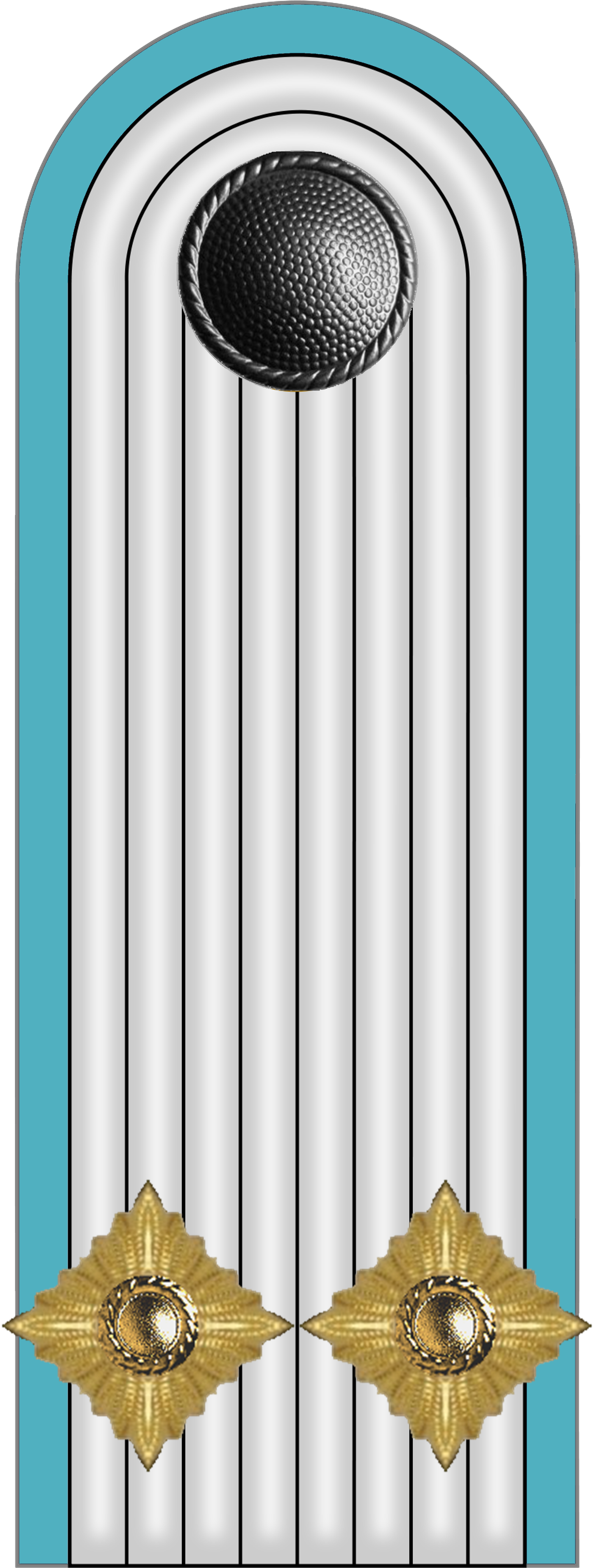
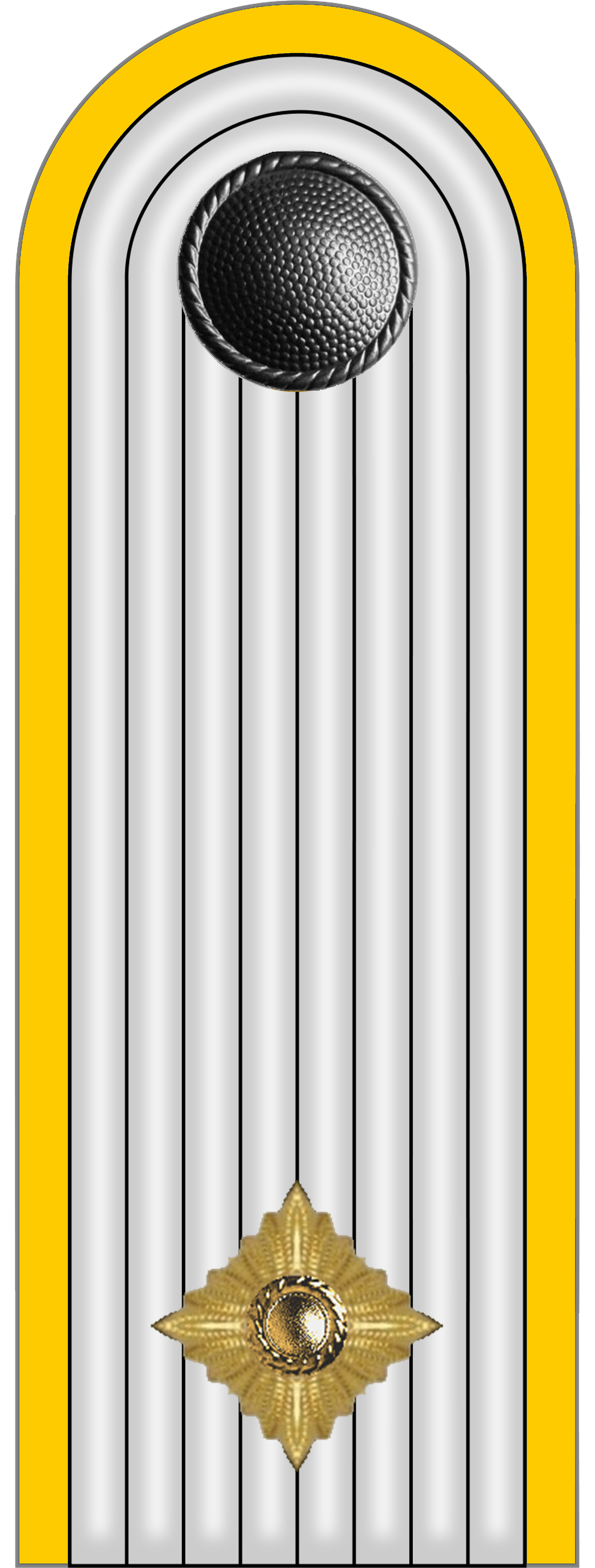
Rank group	General / flag officers					Senior officers			Junior officers
East Germany
East Germany	Marschall der DDR (Note: Unused, war time only.)	Armeegeneral (Note: Reserved for the Minister of National Defence.)	Generaloberst	Generalleutnant	Generalmajor	Oberst	Oberstleutnant	Major	Hauptmann	Oberleutnant	Leutnant	Unterleutnant

=== Officer candidate or officer aspirant (OA) ===
The table below contains the Ofiziersschüler ranks (en: student officers; equivalent to officer candidate or officer aspirant (OA)).

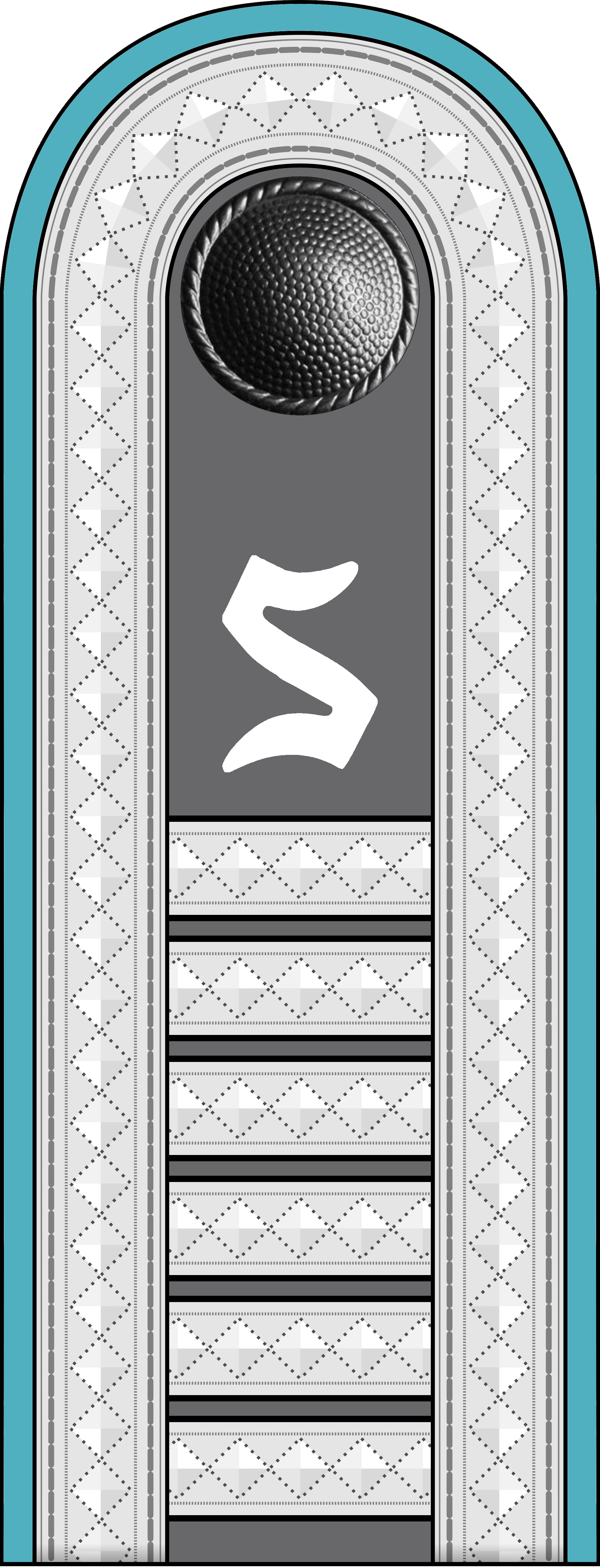
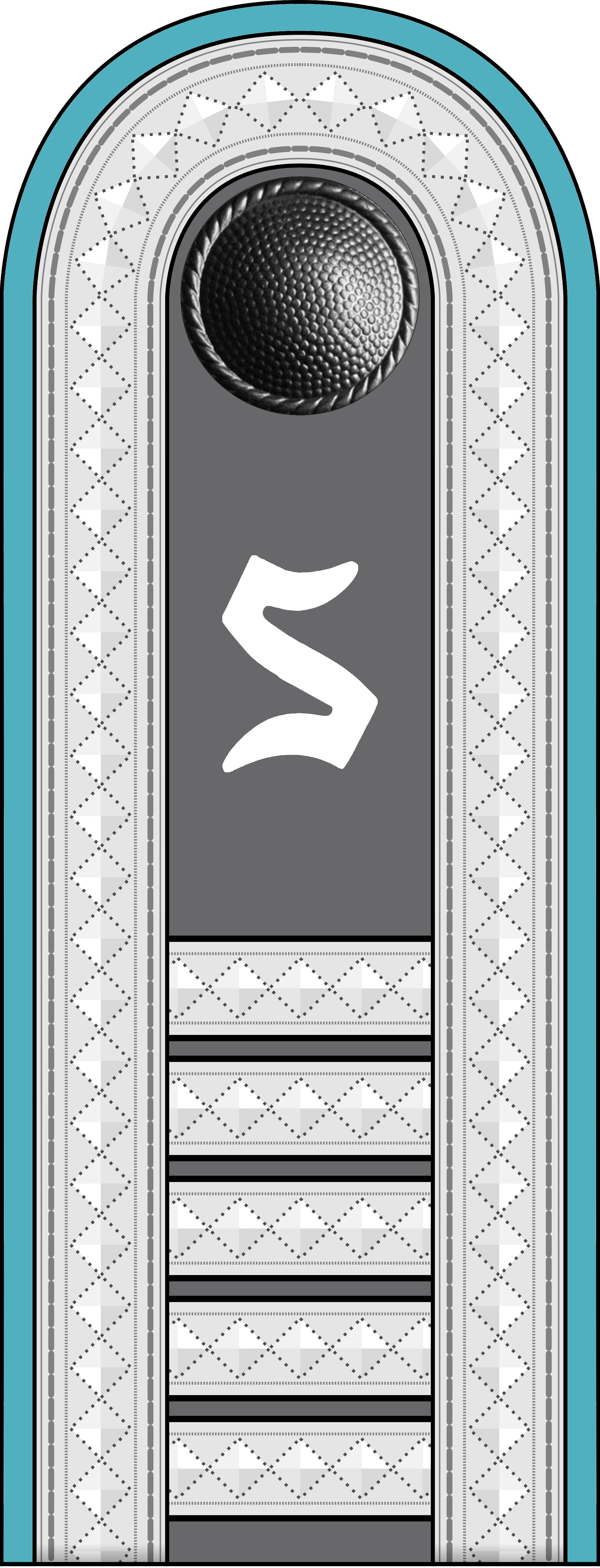
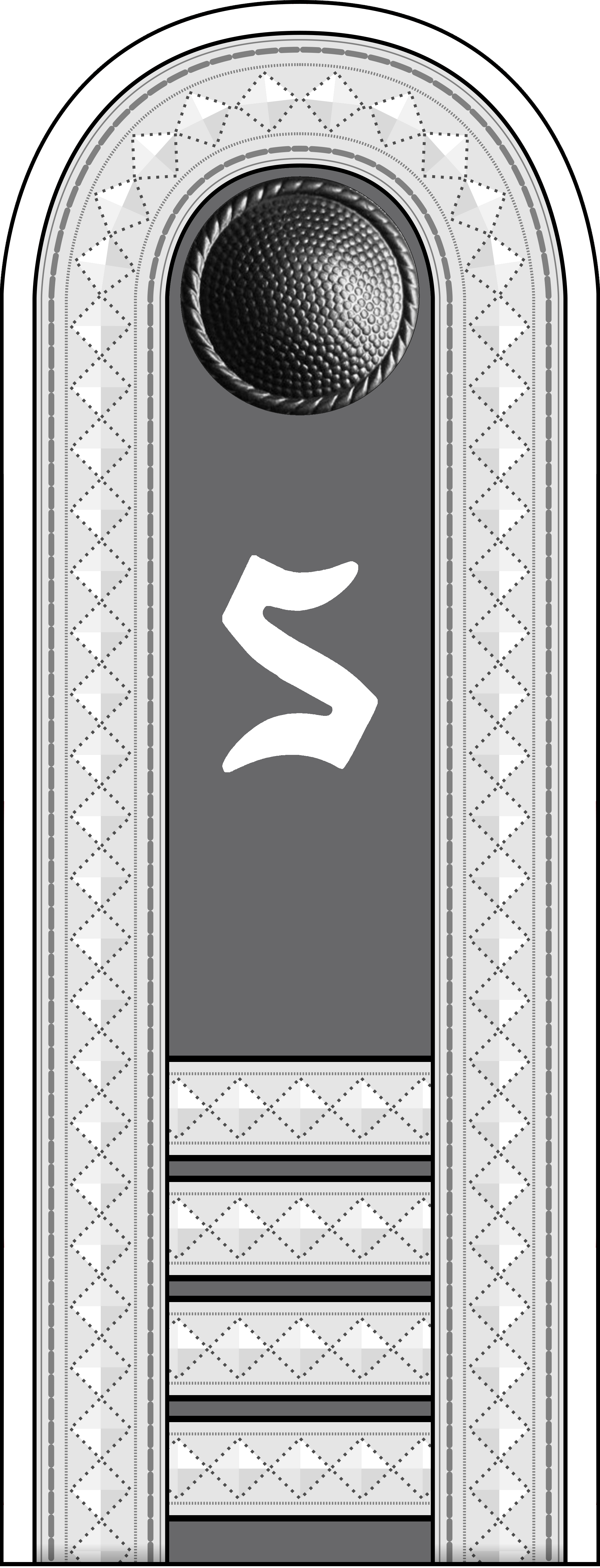
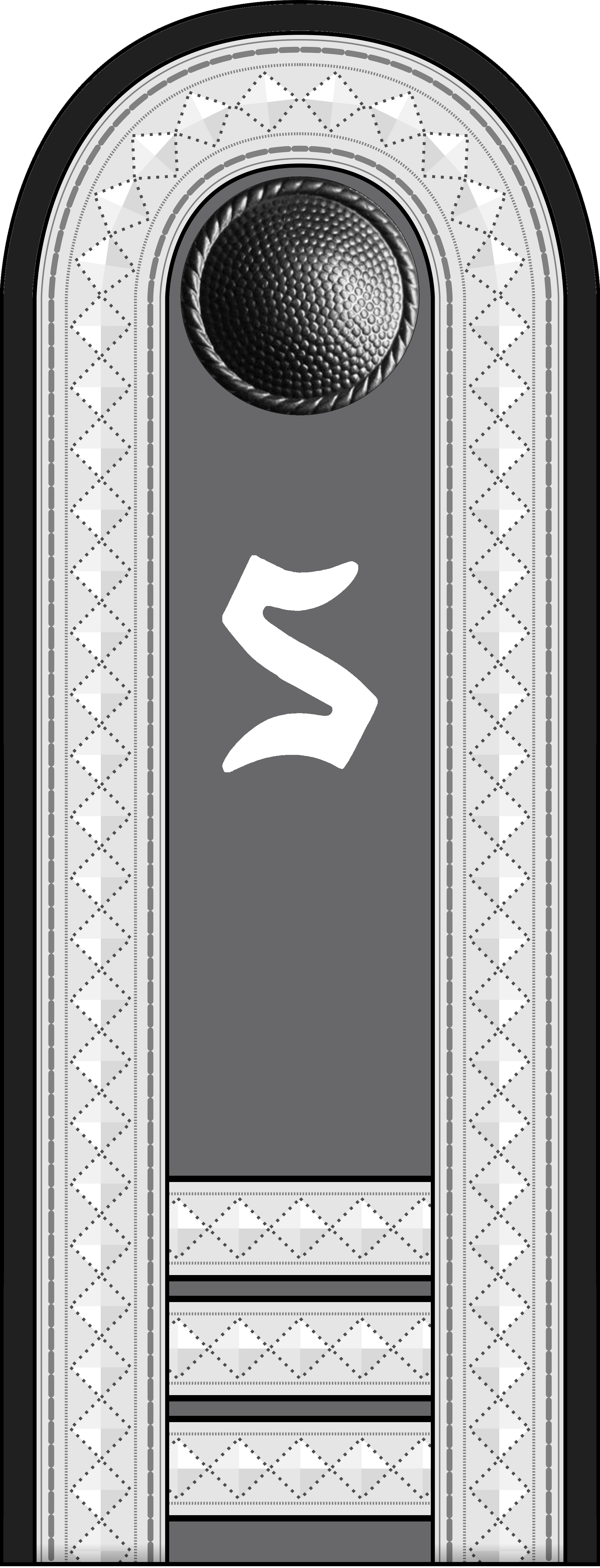
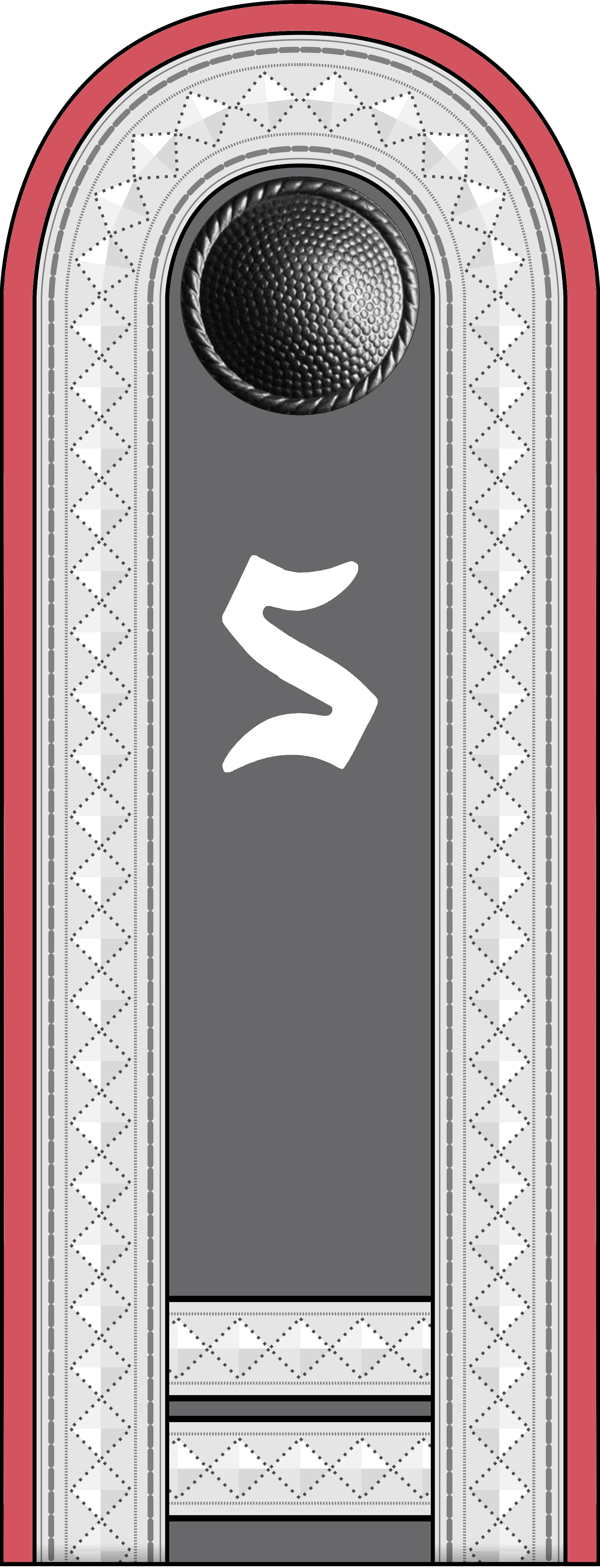
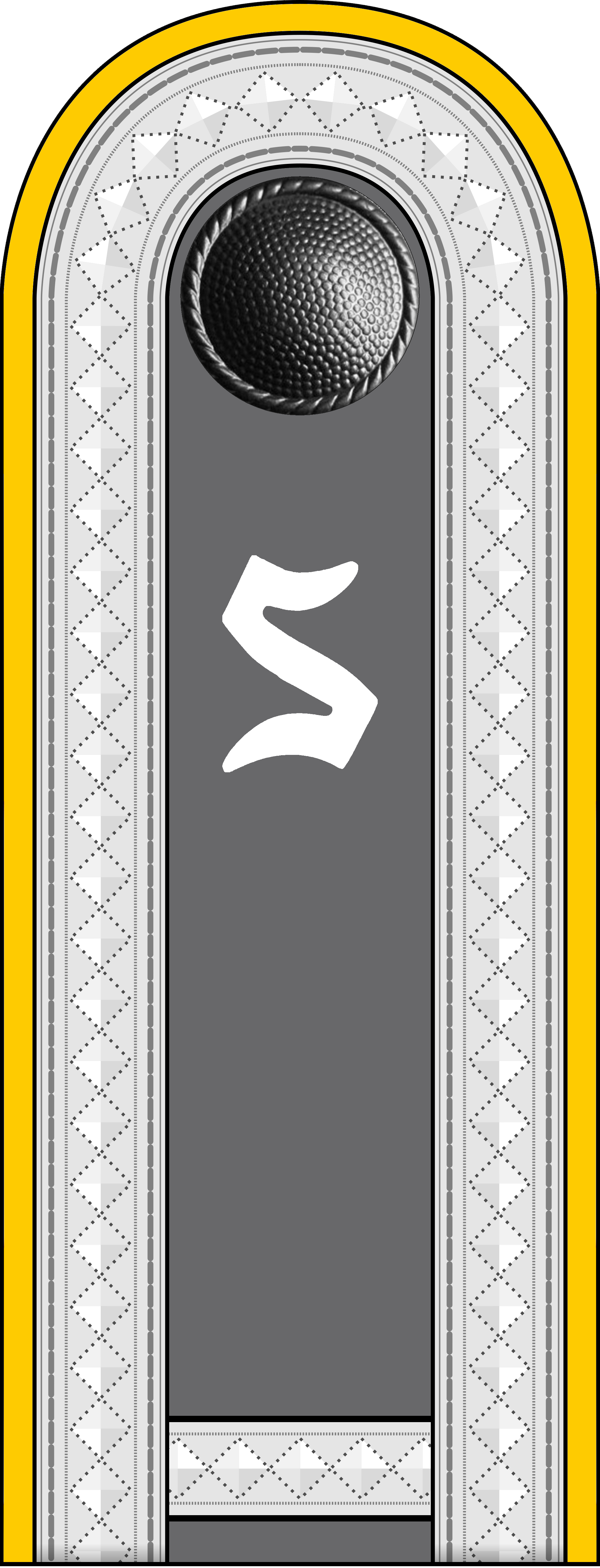
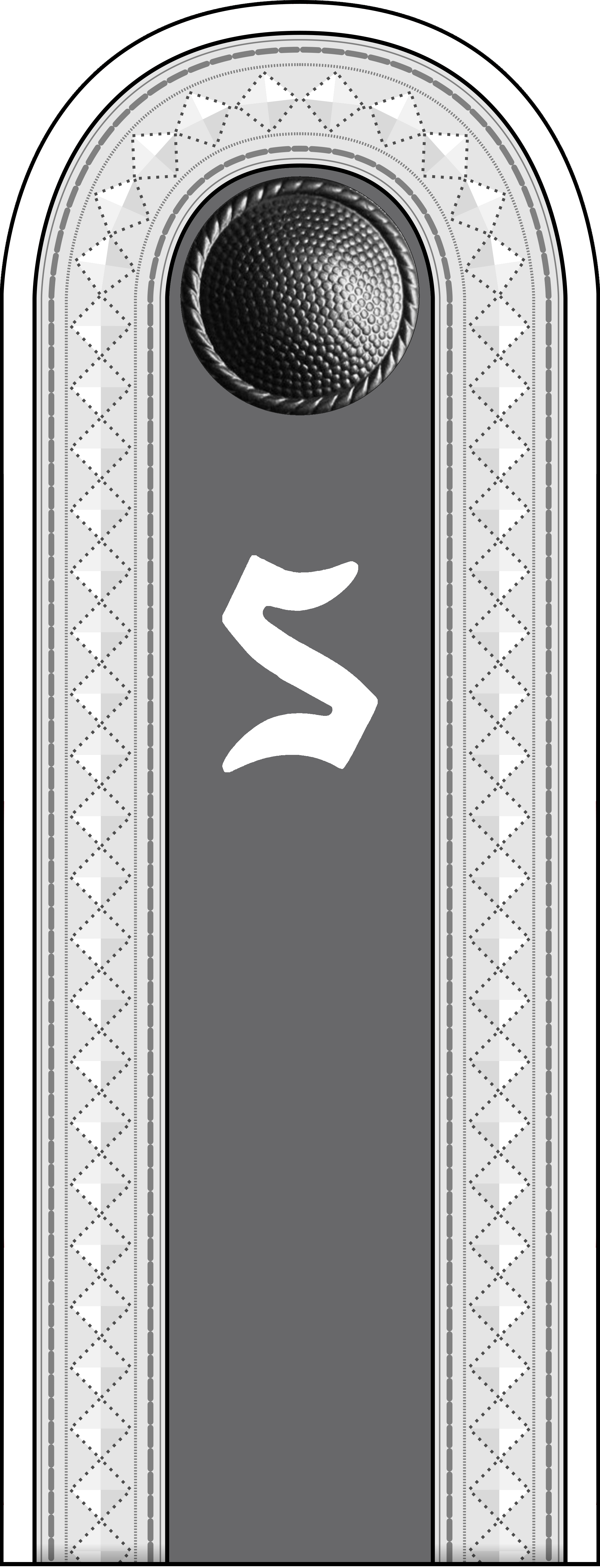
Offiziersschüler (OF(D))
Academic year	6th	5th	4th	3rd	2nd	1st	Preparation course
Shoulder boards
Corps colour/ Troops	Air Force (Luftstreitkräfte)		Motorized infantry (Mot.-Schützen)	Engineers (Pioniere)	Armoured troops (Panzertruppen)	Communications (Nachrichten)	Motorized infantry

=== Warrant officers ===
Fähnrichkorps and Fähnrichschüler of the NPA
Sleeve insignia (1979-1990)	Stabsoberfähnrich	Stabsfähnrich	Oberfähnrich	Fähnrich	Fähnrichschüler
Sleeve insignia (1979-1990)	W-4	W-3	W-2	W-1	W (Student)
	(Staff-senior-Warrant Officer)	(Staff-Warrant Officer)	(Senior-Warrant Officer)	(Warrant Officer)	(Warrant Officer-Cadet)

Sleeve insignia as to 1973-1979
20 years of service	15 years of service	10 years of service

=== NCO and enlisted ranks ===
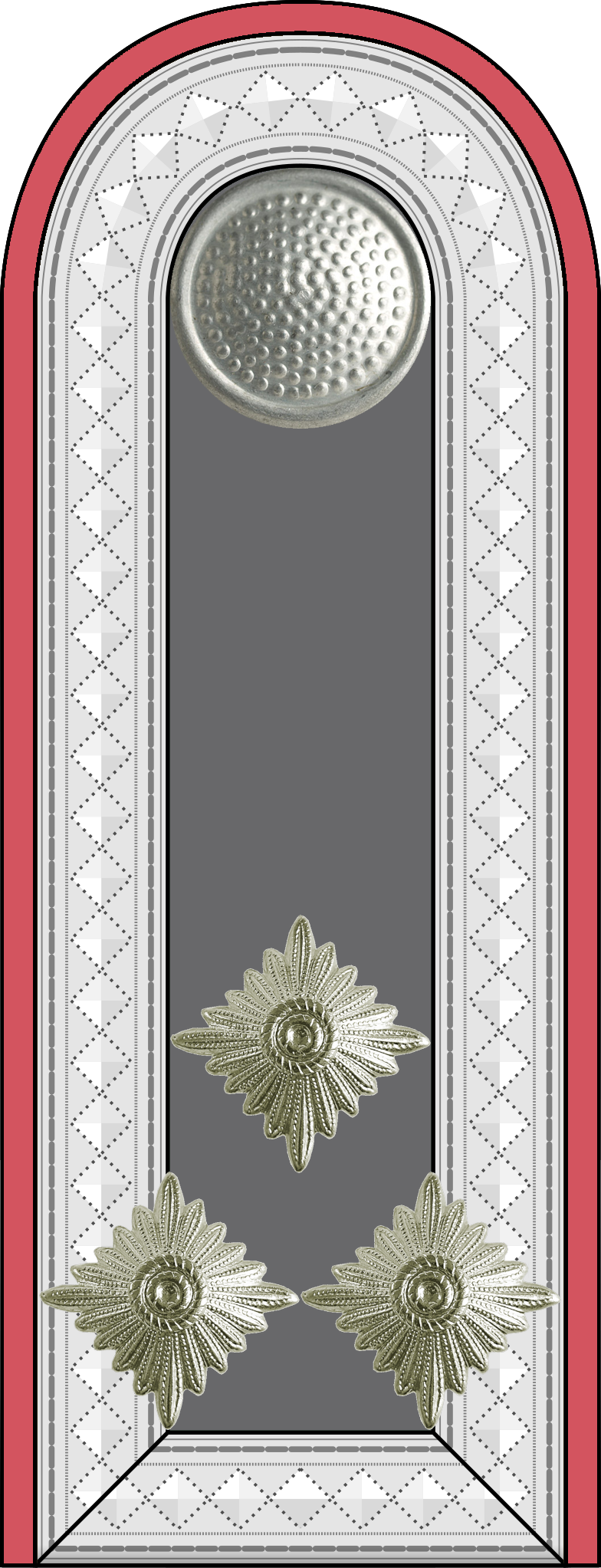
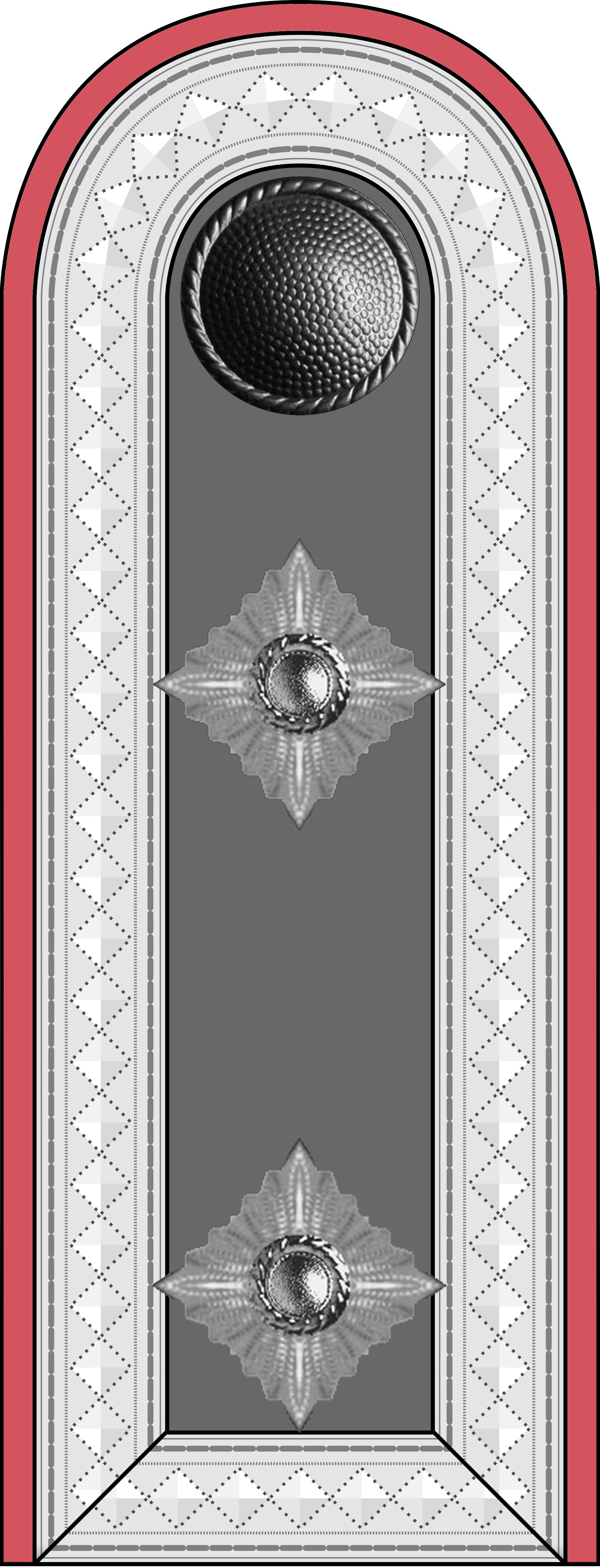
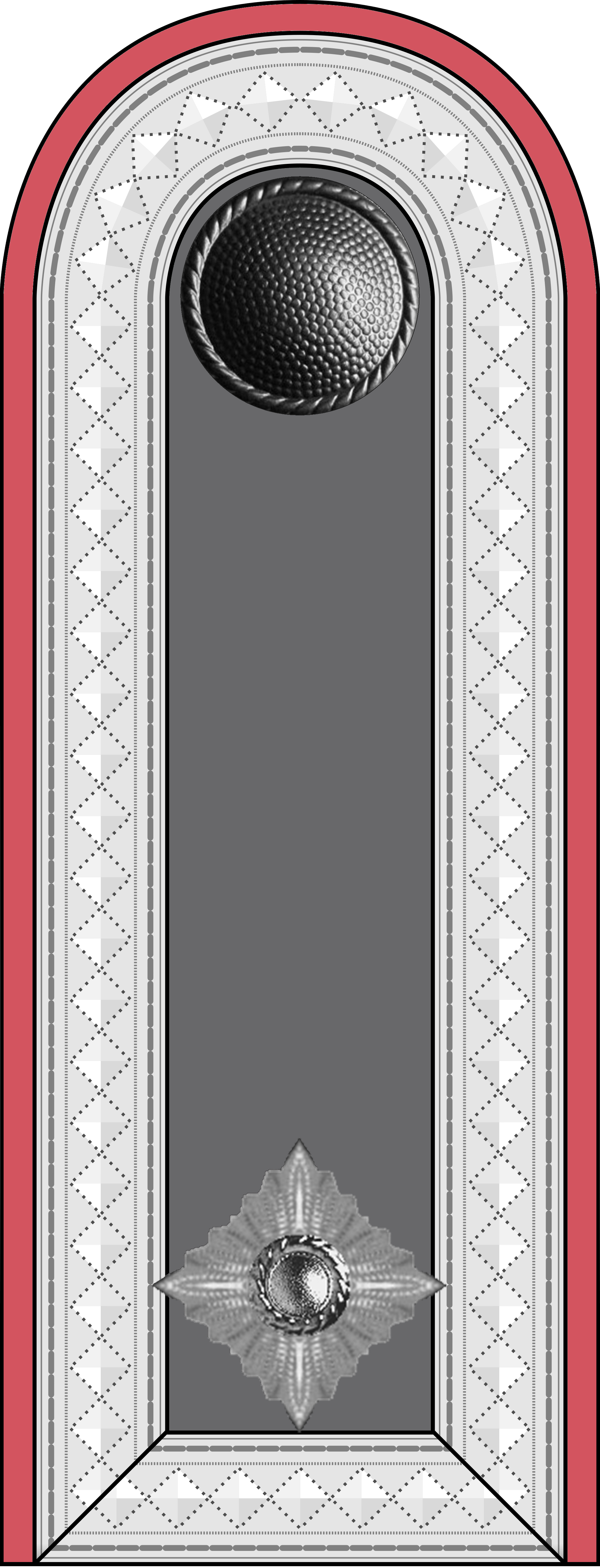
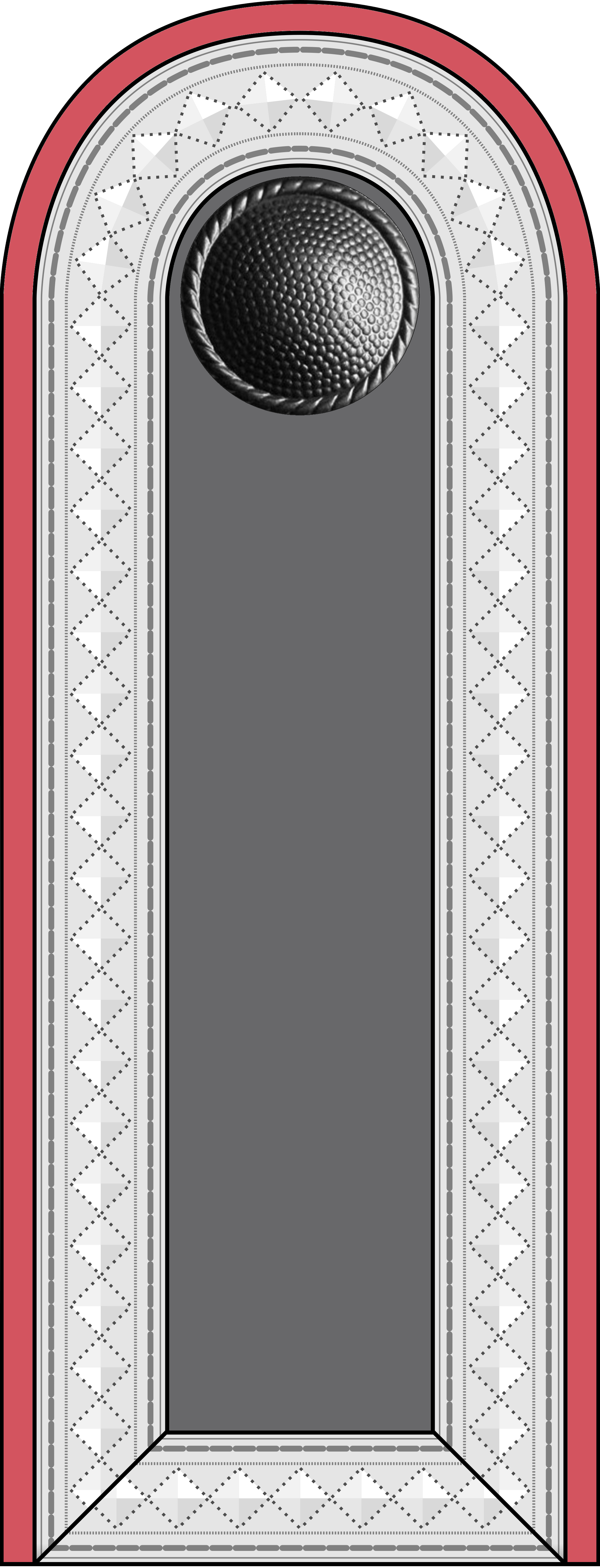
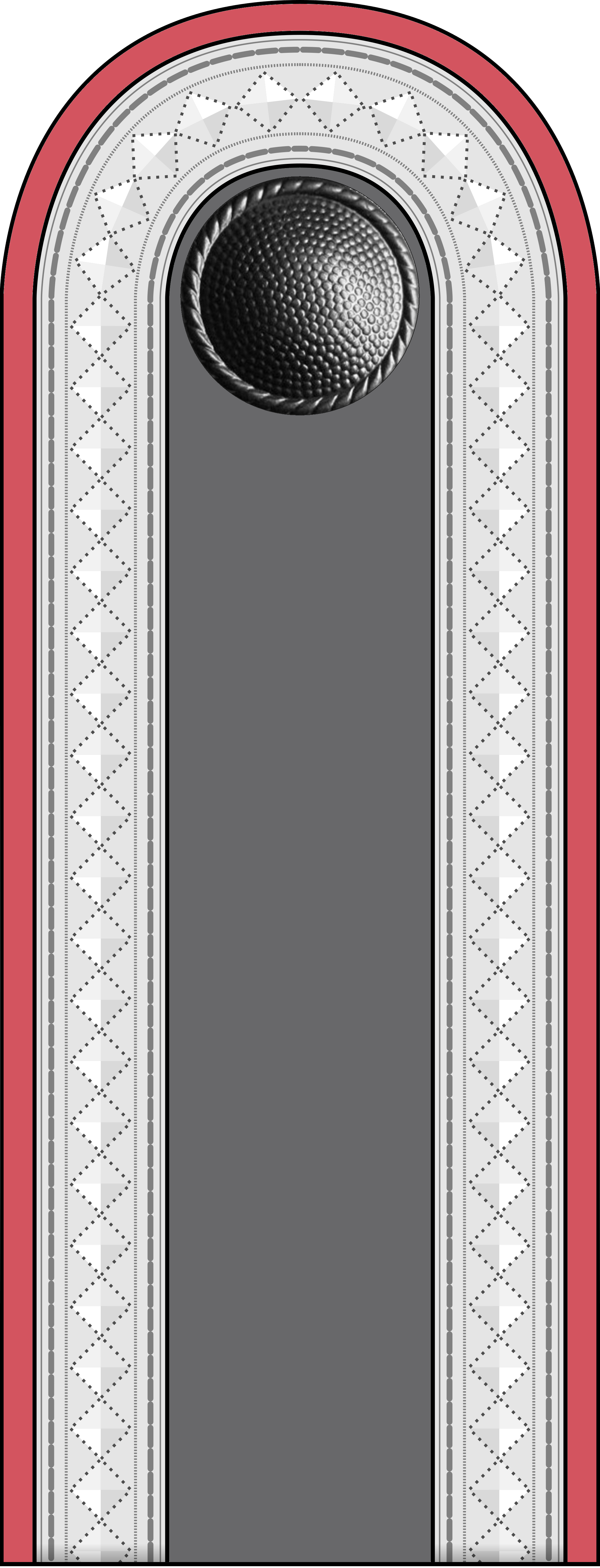
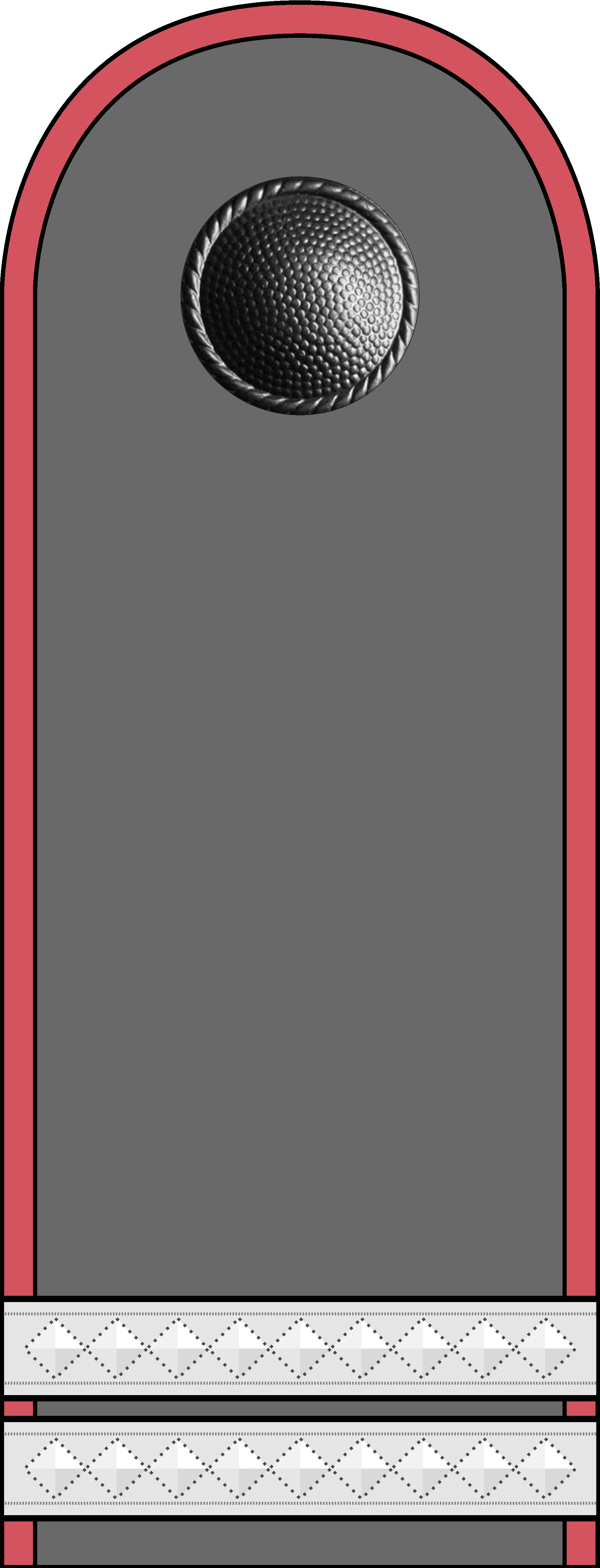
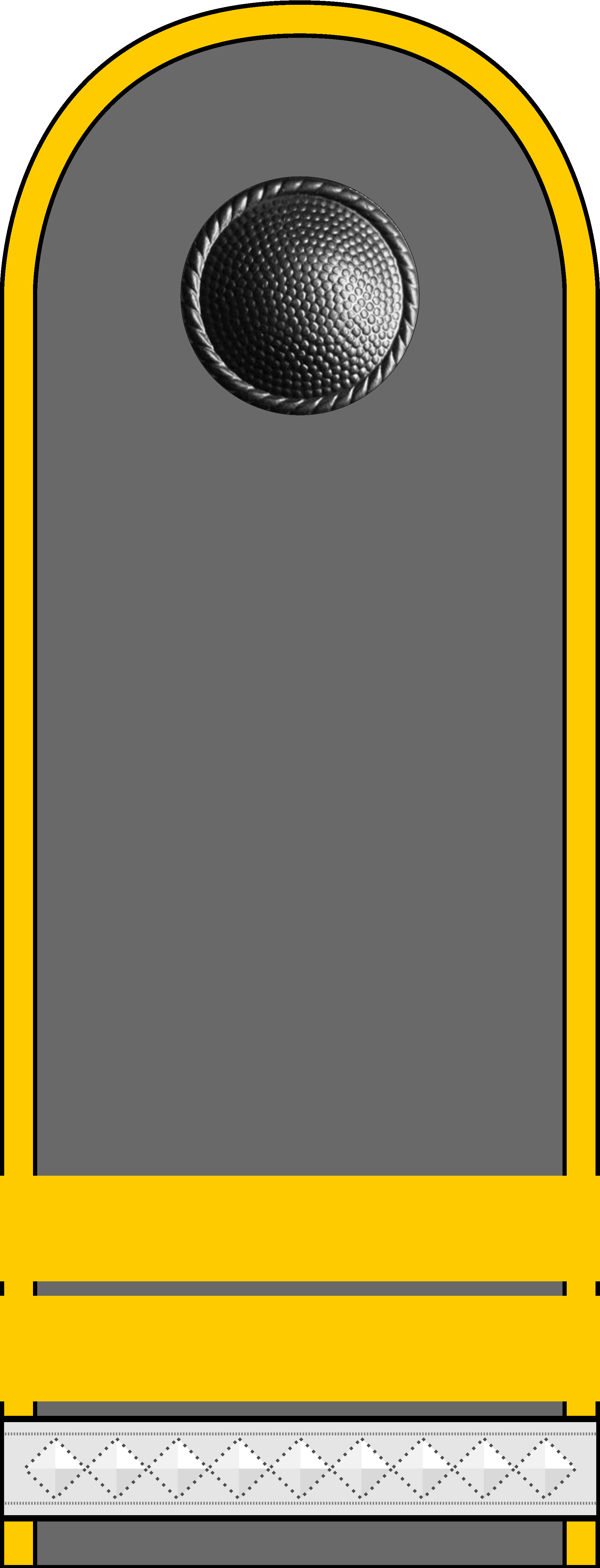
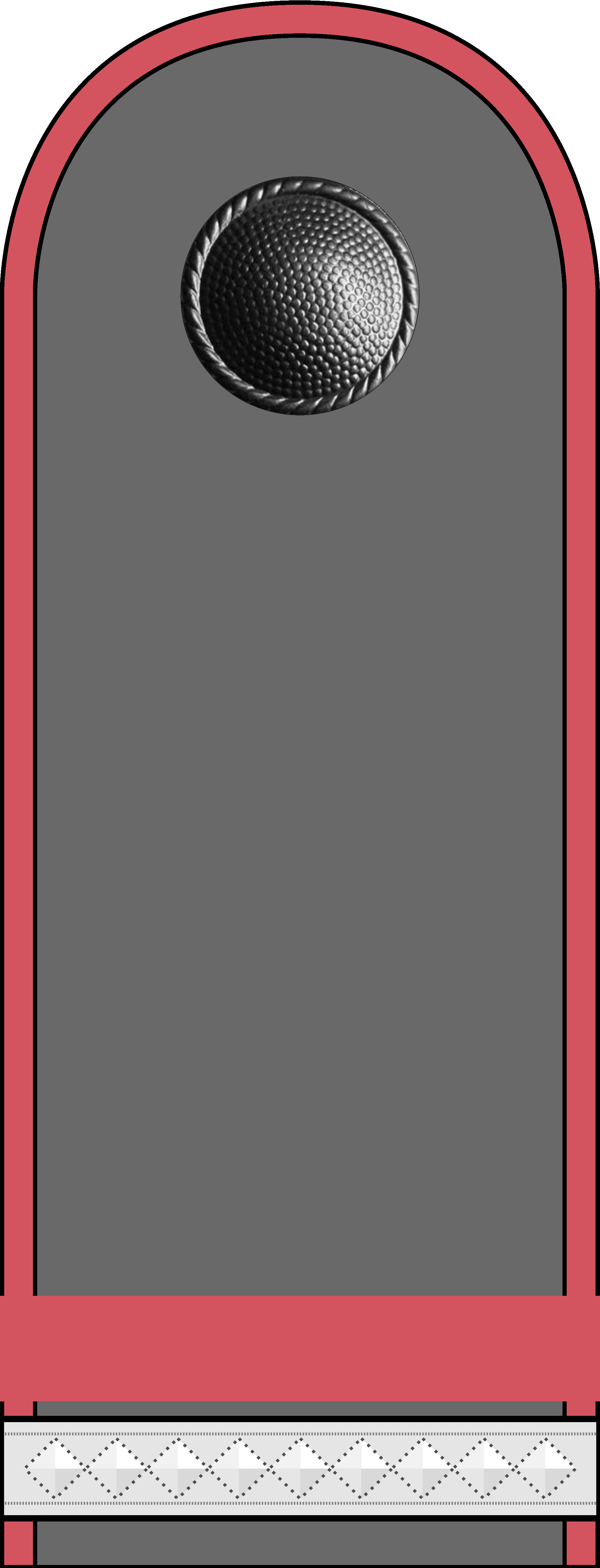
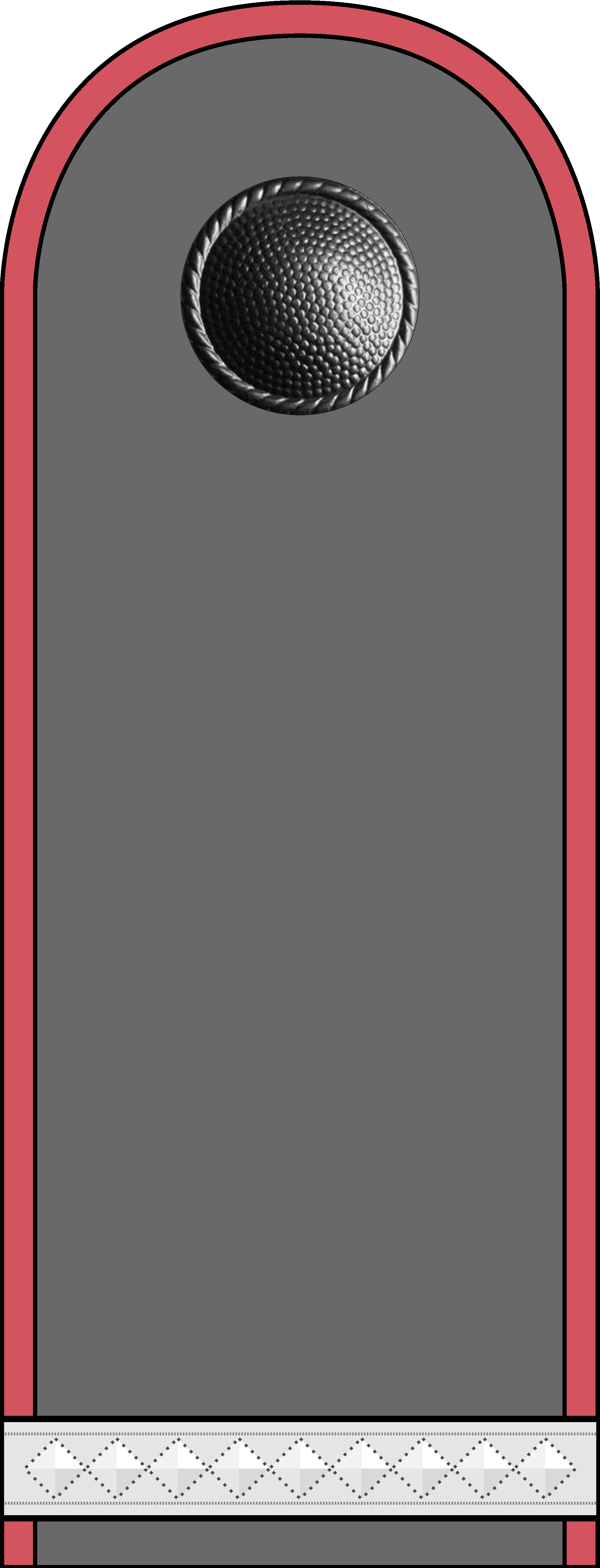
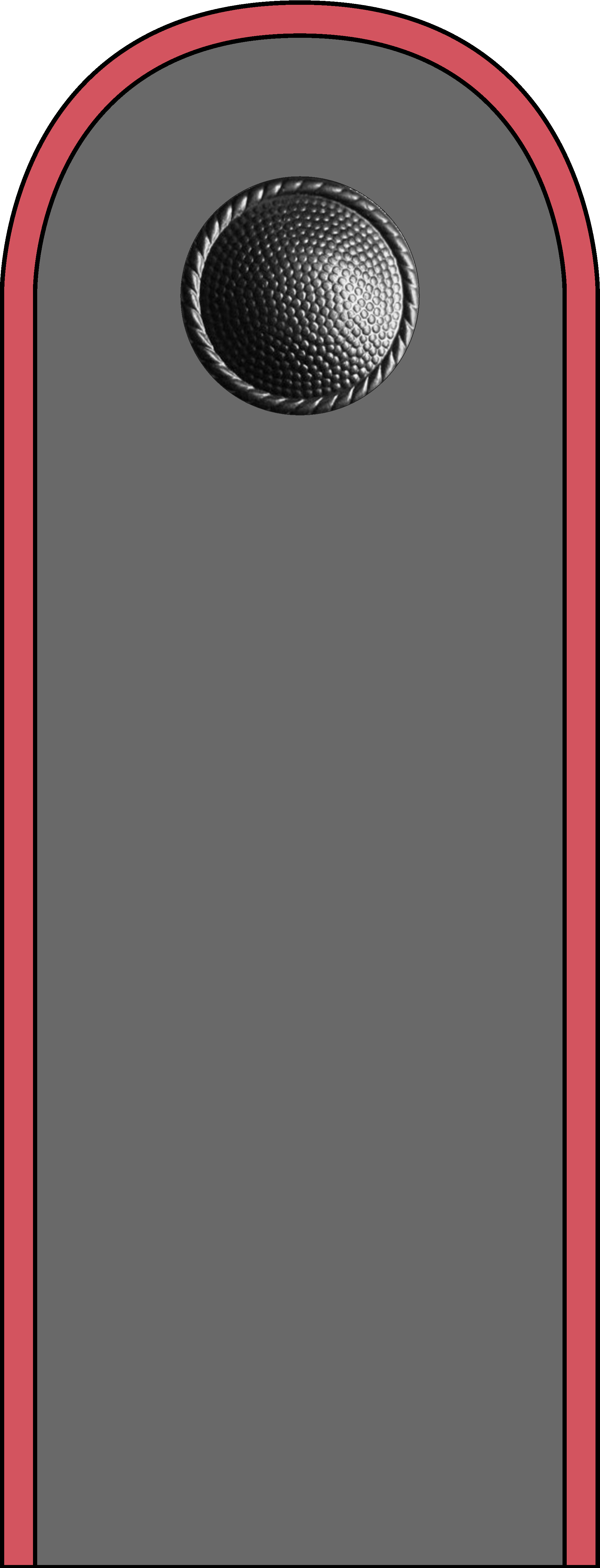
Rank group	Senior NCOs					Junior NCOs			Enlisted
(East Germany) East Germany
(East Germany) East Germany	Stabsfeldwebel	Oberfeldwebel	Feldwebel	Unterfeldwebel	Unteroffizier	Stabsgefreiter	Gefreiter der Ausbildung	Unteroffiziersschüler	Gefreiter	Soldat

== Volksmarine ==
While the sleeve ranks of the Volksmarine officers were of the style used by the Soviet Navy, all shoulder board insignia used were German in origin, with the star arrangement for officers based on the Soviet rank insignia.

=== Officer ranks and insignia ===
Unlike most Warsaw pact navies, the People's Navy also used staff corps insignia on the sleeve following traditional German practice. The sleeve rank insignia shown are those of the line officer corps.

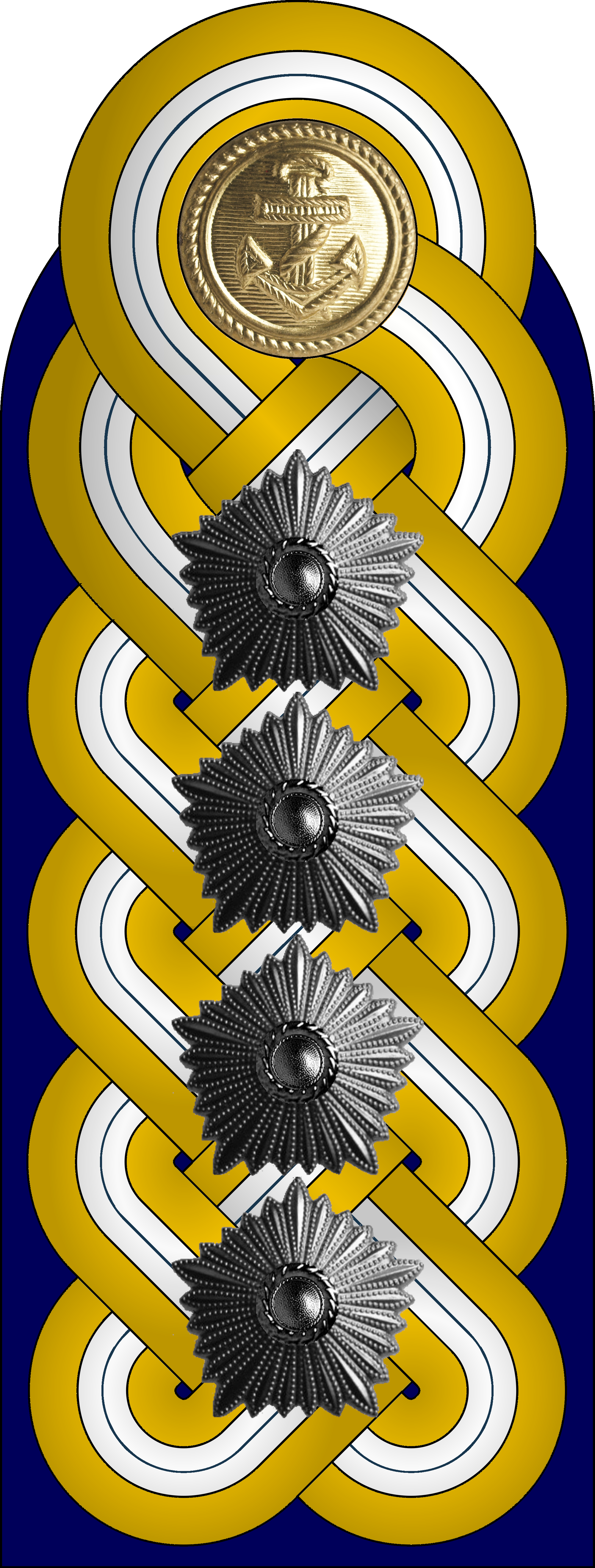
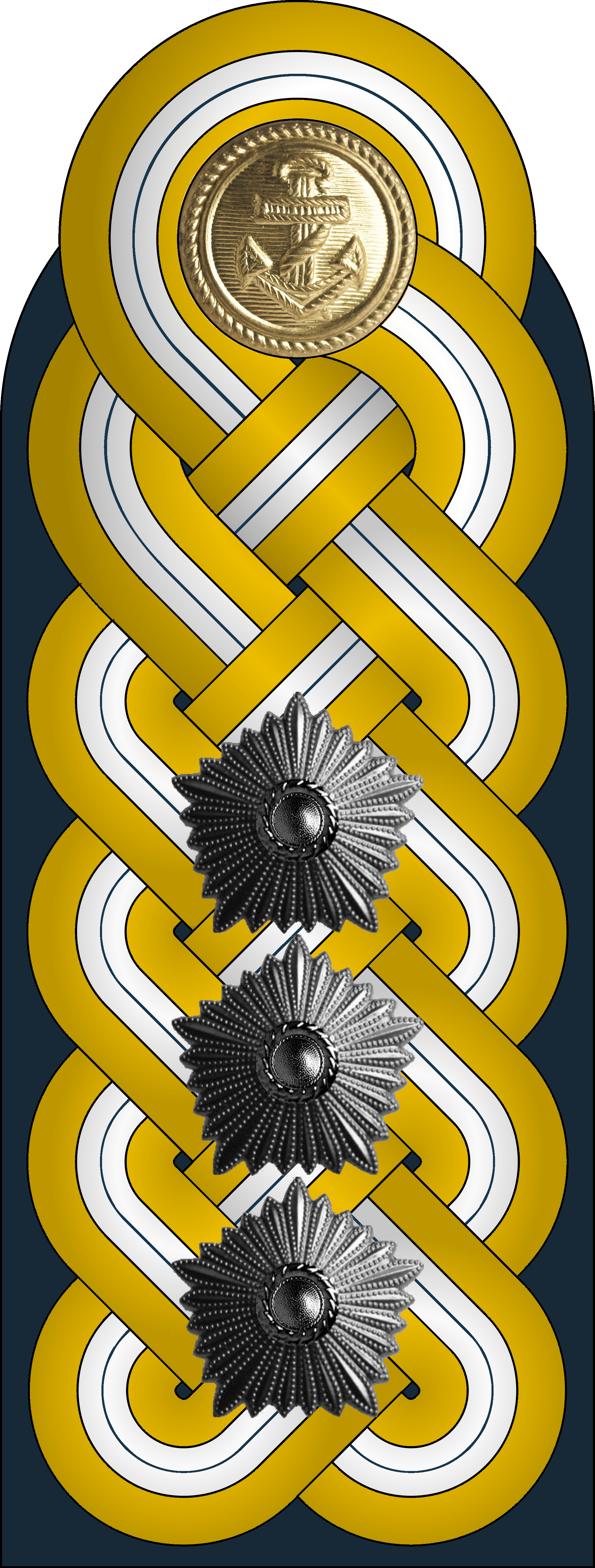
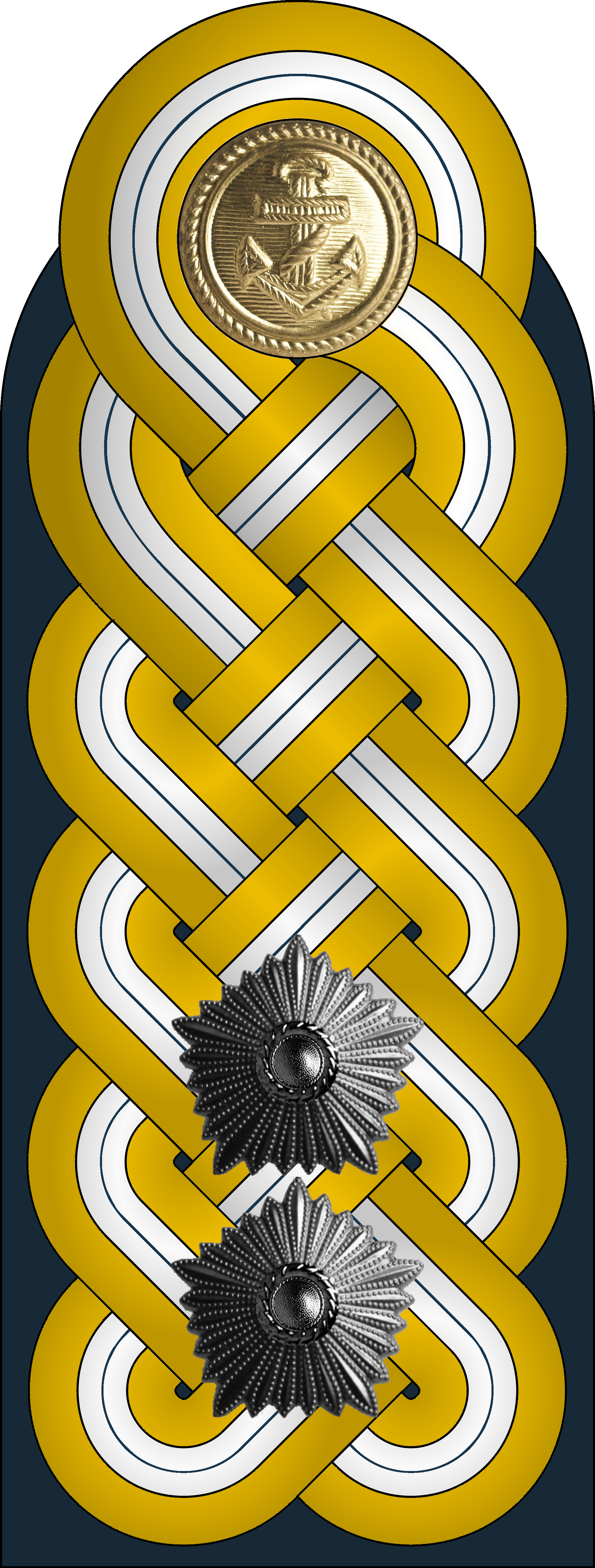
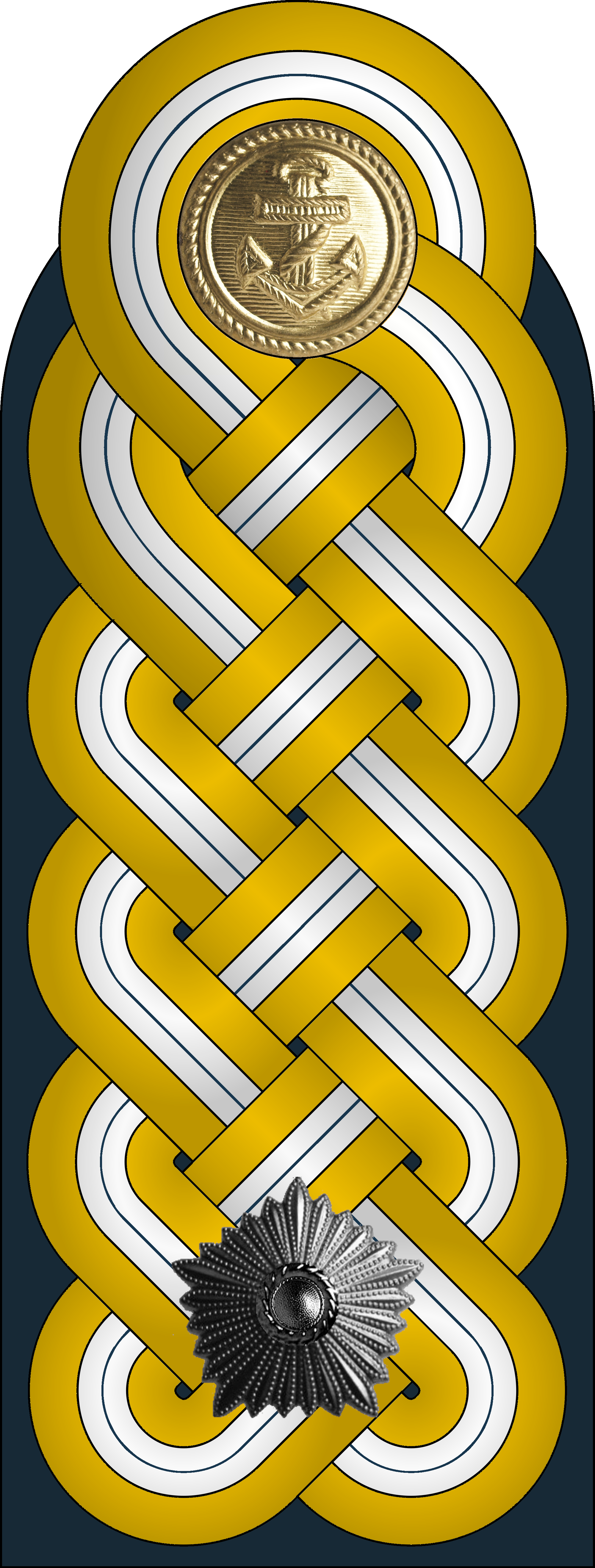
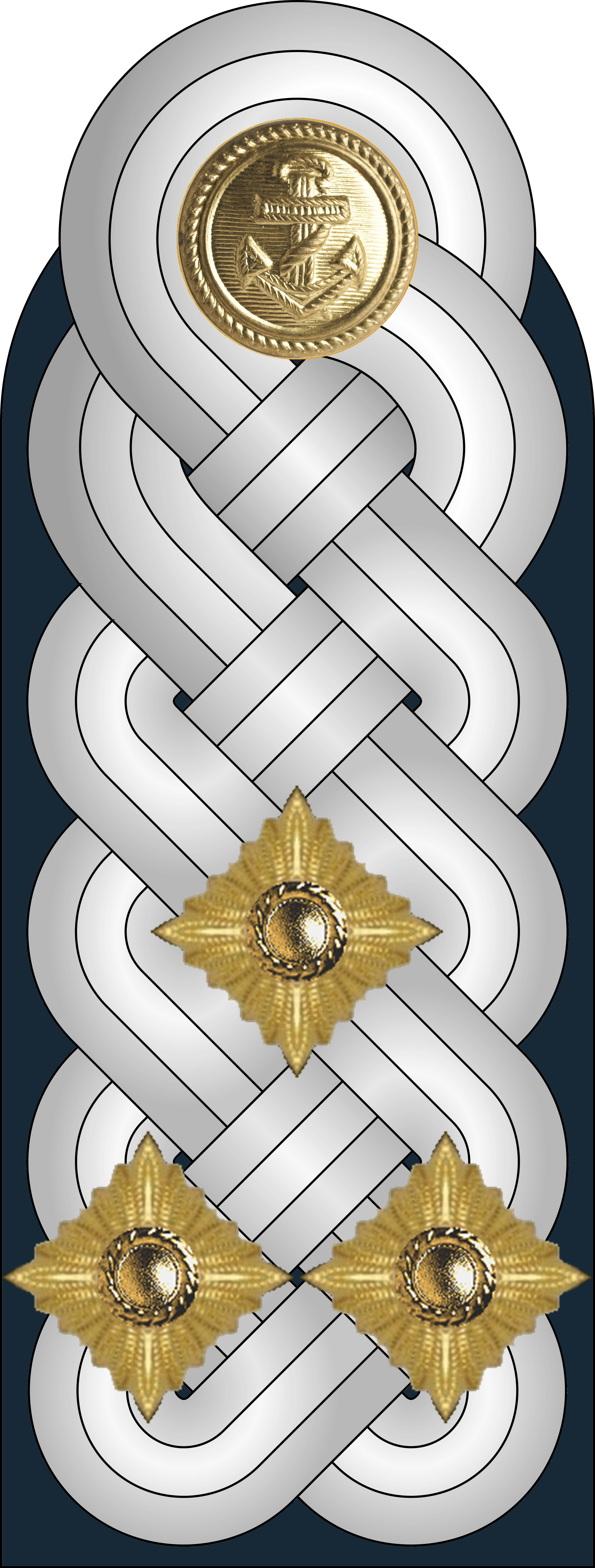
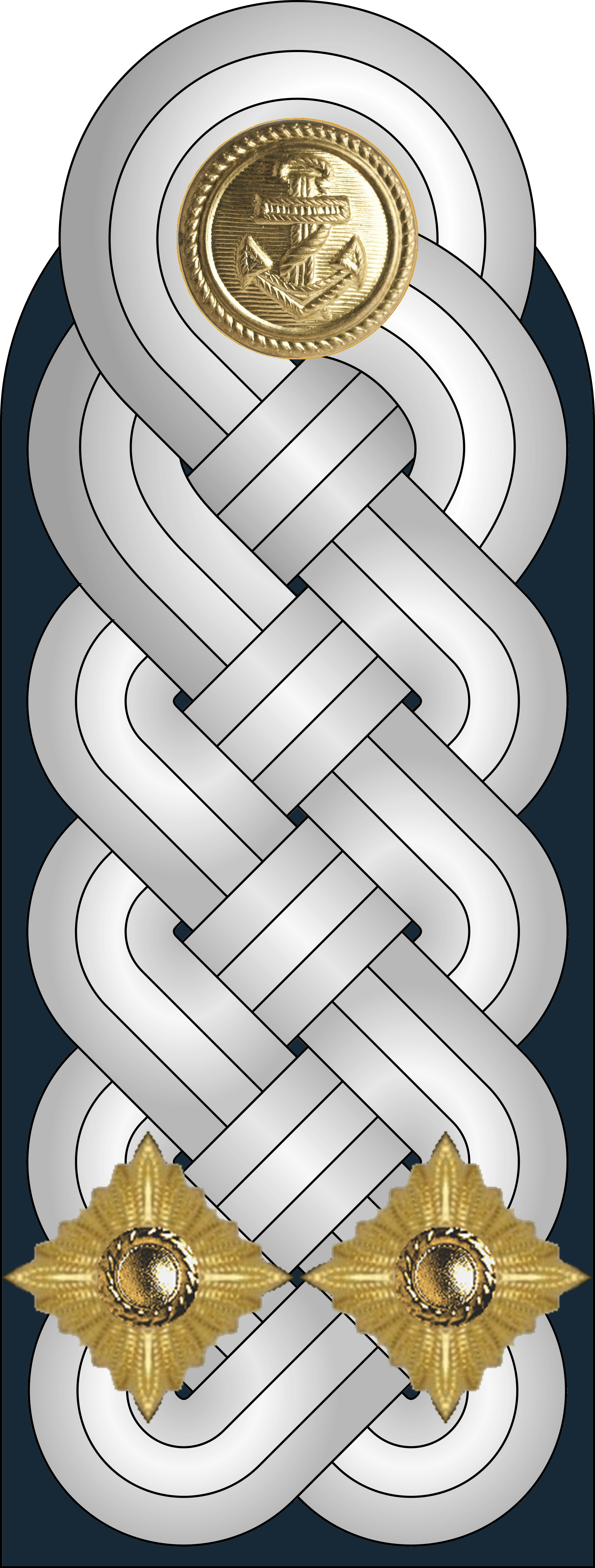
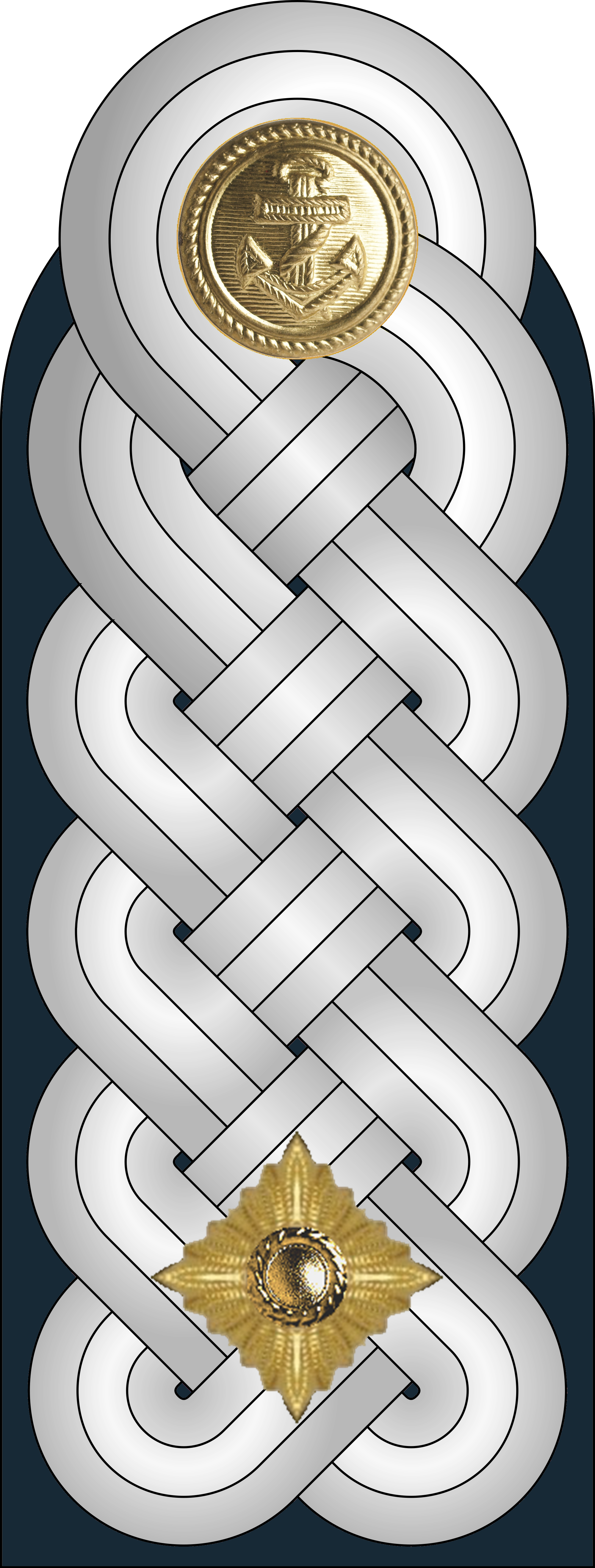
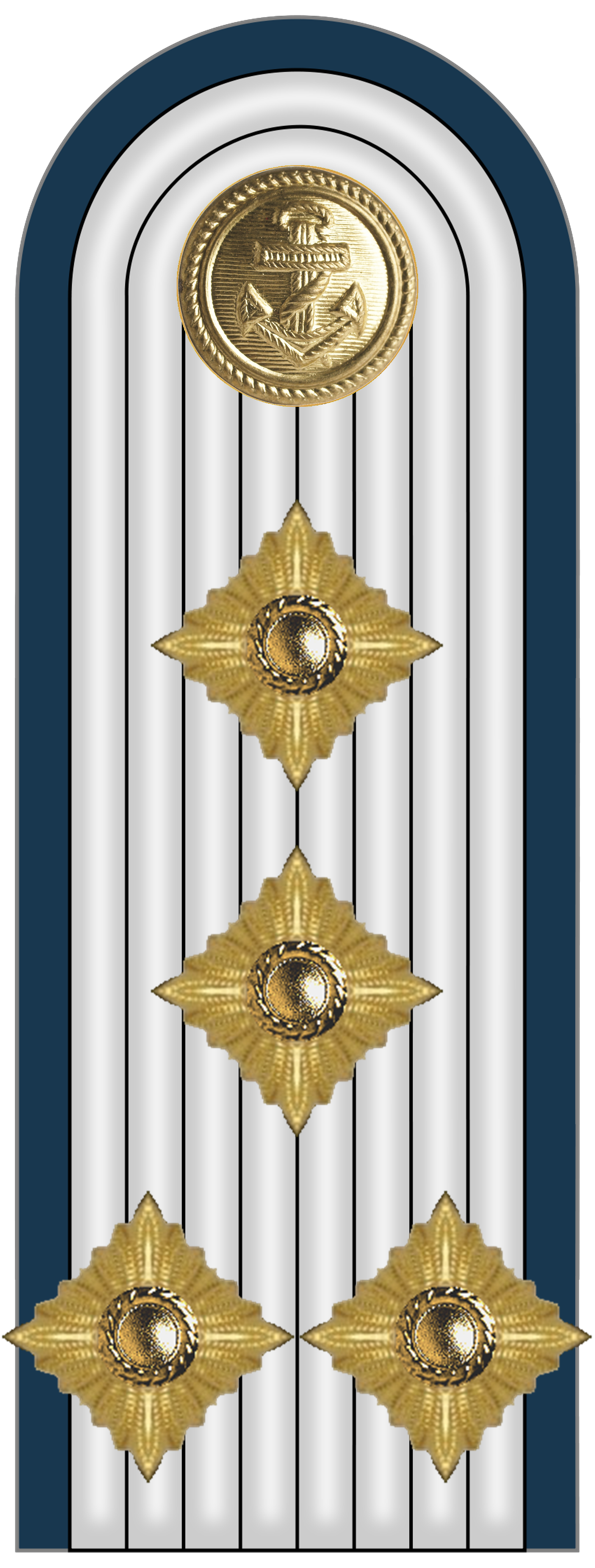
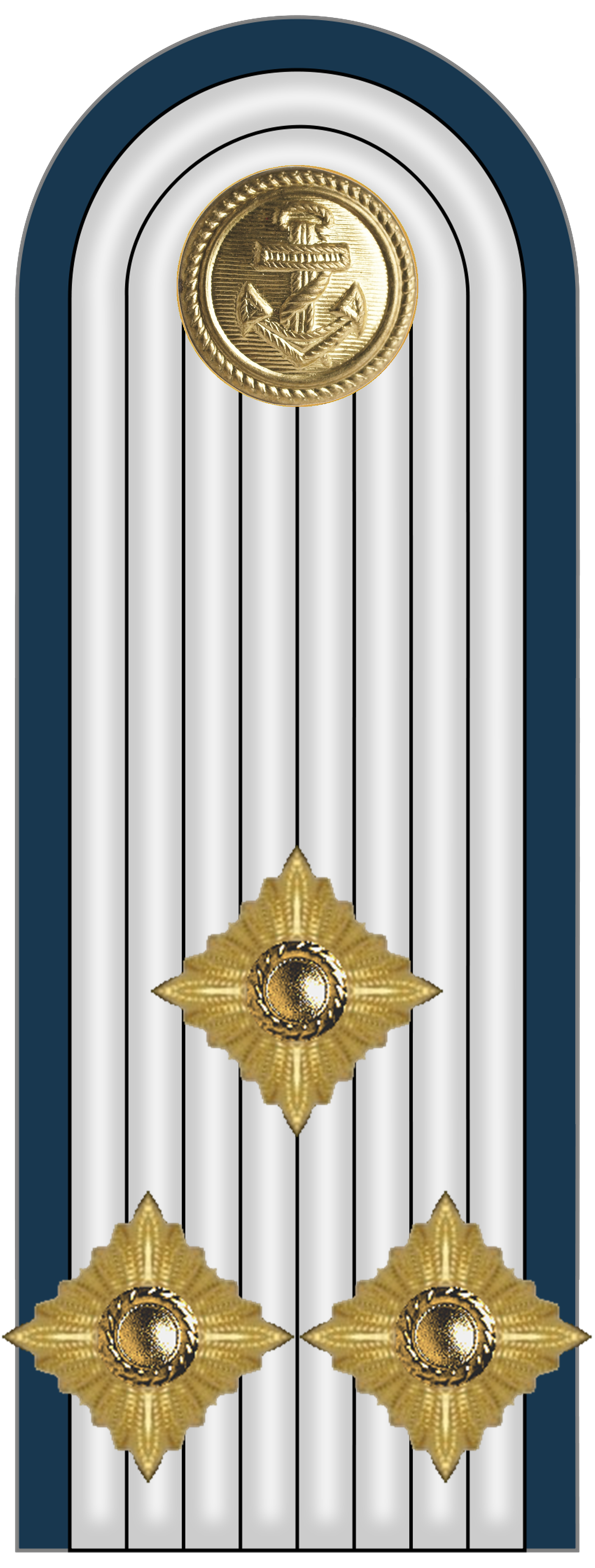
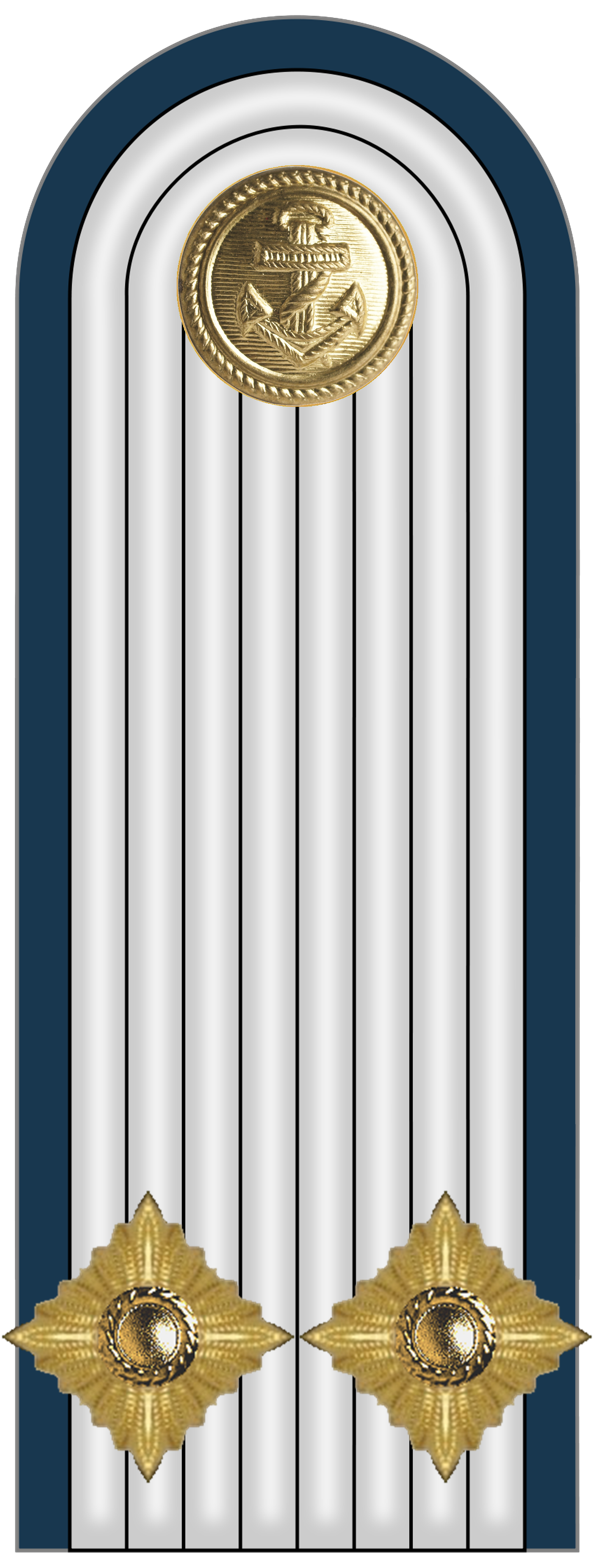
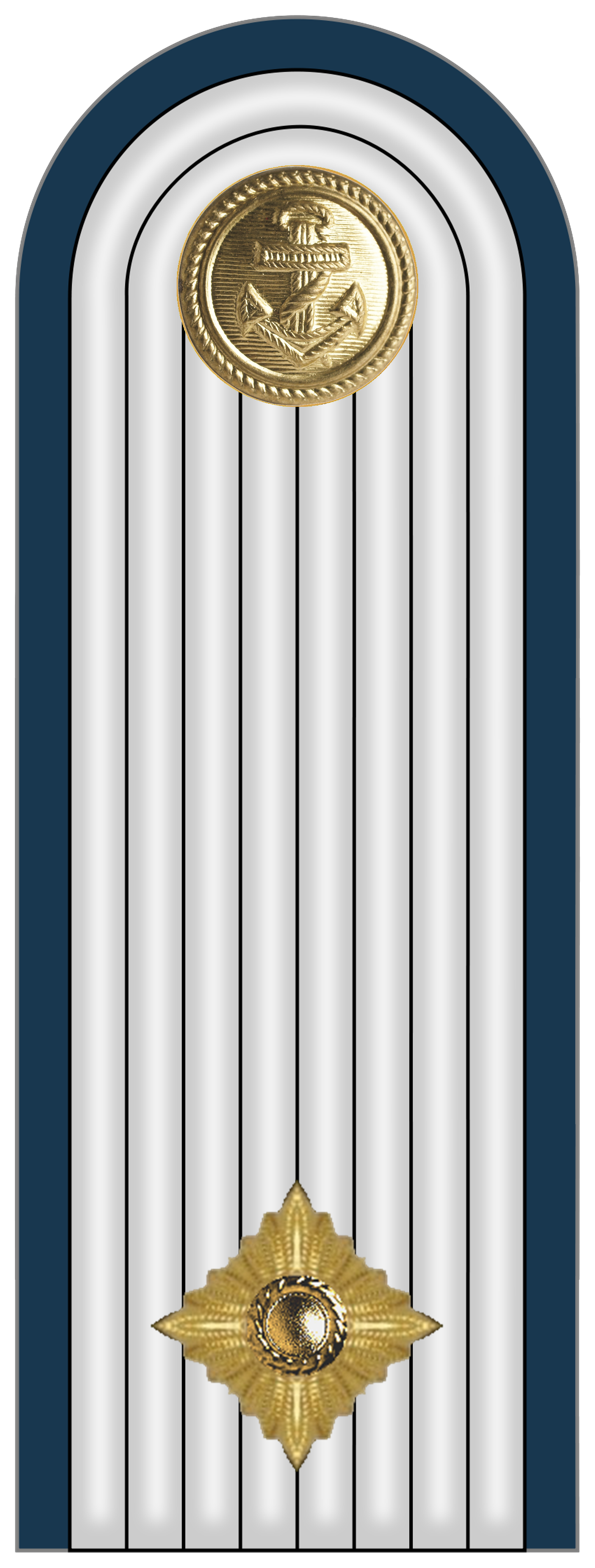
Rank group	General / flag officers				Senior officers			Junior officers
Volksmarine
Volksmarine	Flottenadmiral (Note: Unused; reserved for the Minister of National Defence if a Navy officer. However, the only person this applied to, Theodor Hoffmann, was only promoted to Admiral.)	Admiral	Vizeadmiral	Konteradmiral	Kapitän zur See	Fregattenkapitän	Korvettenkapitän	Kapitänleutnant	Oberleutnant zur See	Leutnant zur See	Unterleutnant zur See

Command flags

Flottenadmiral

Admiral

Vizeadmiral

Konteradmiral

=== Officer candidate or officer aspirant (OA) ===
The table below contains the Ofiziersschüler ranks (en: student officers; equivalent to officer candidate or officer aspirant (OA)).

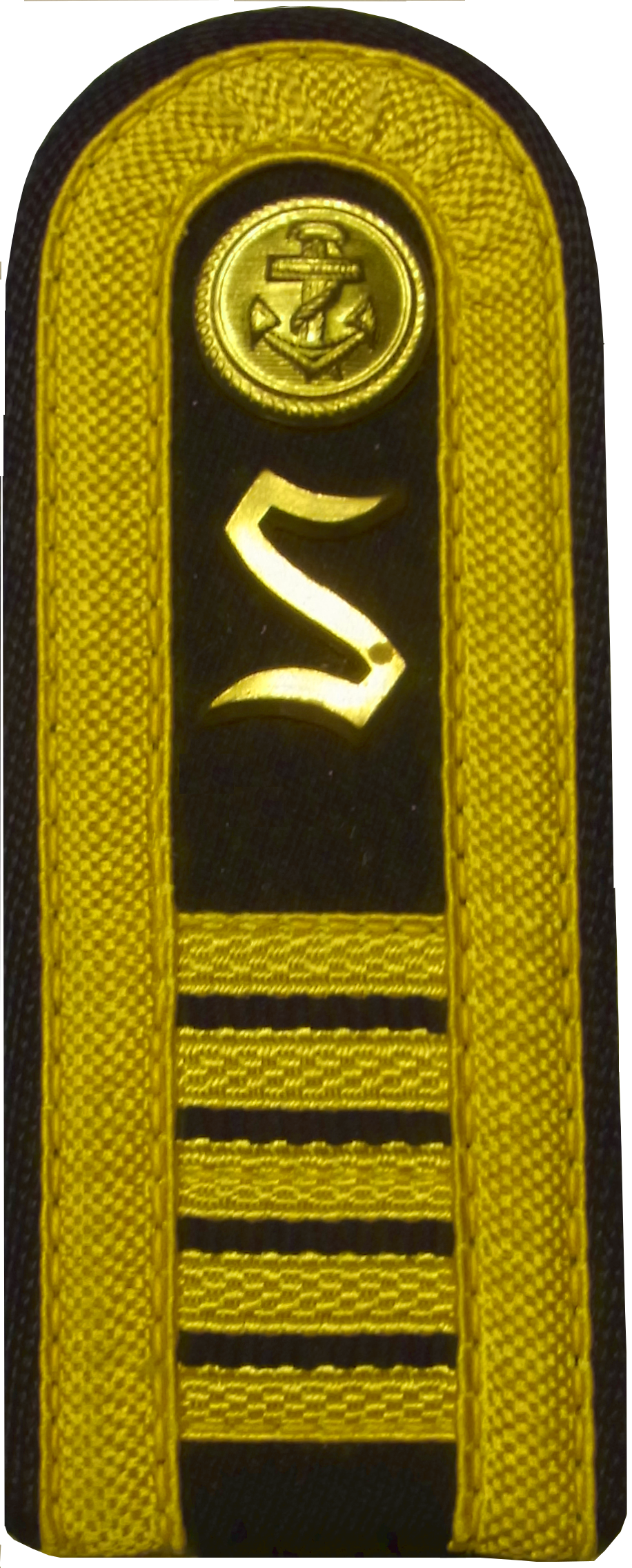
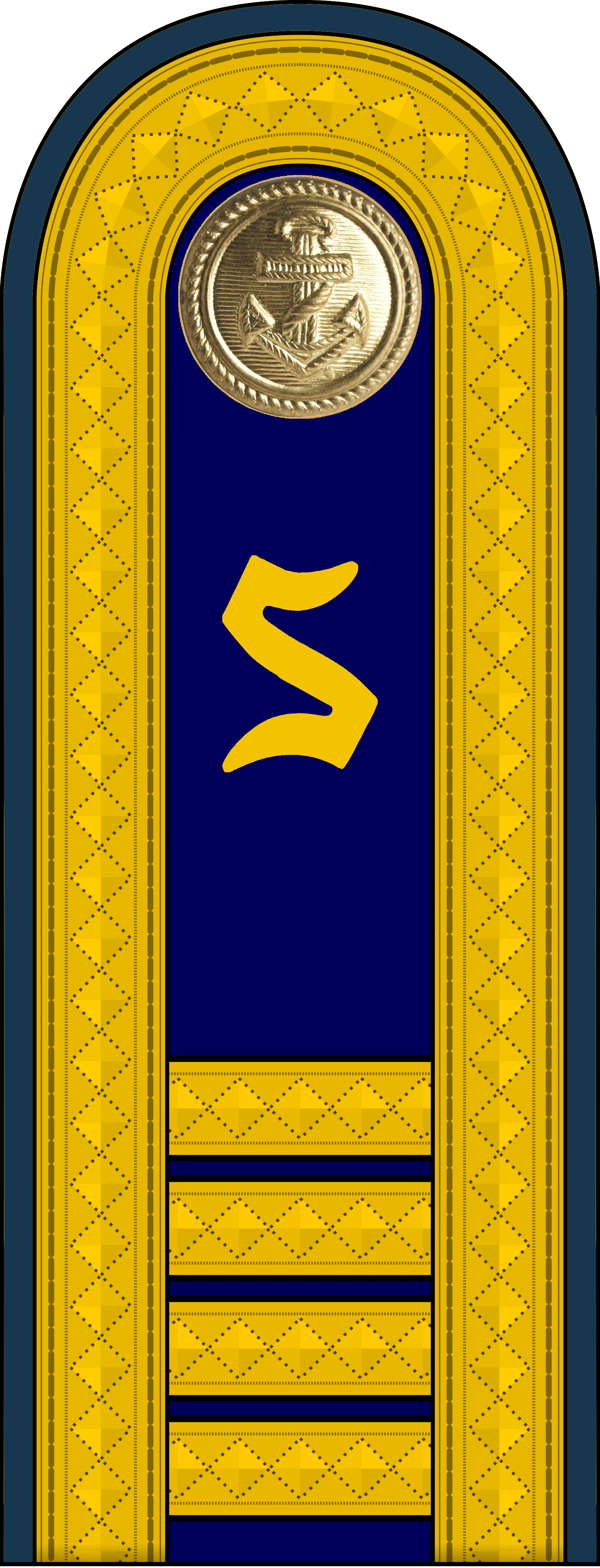
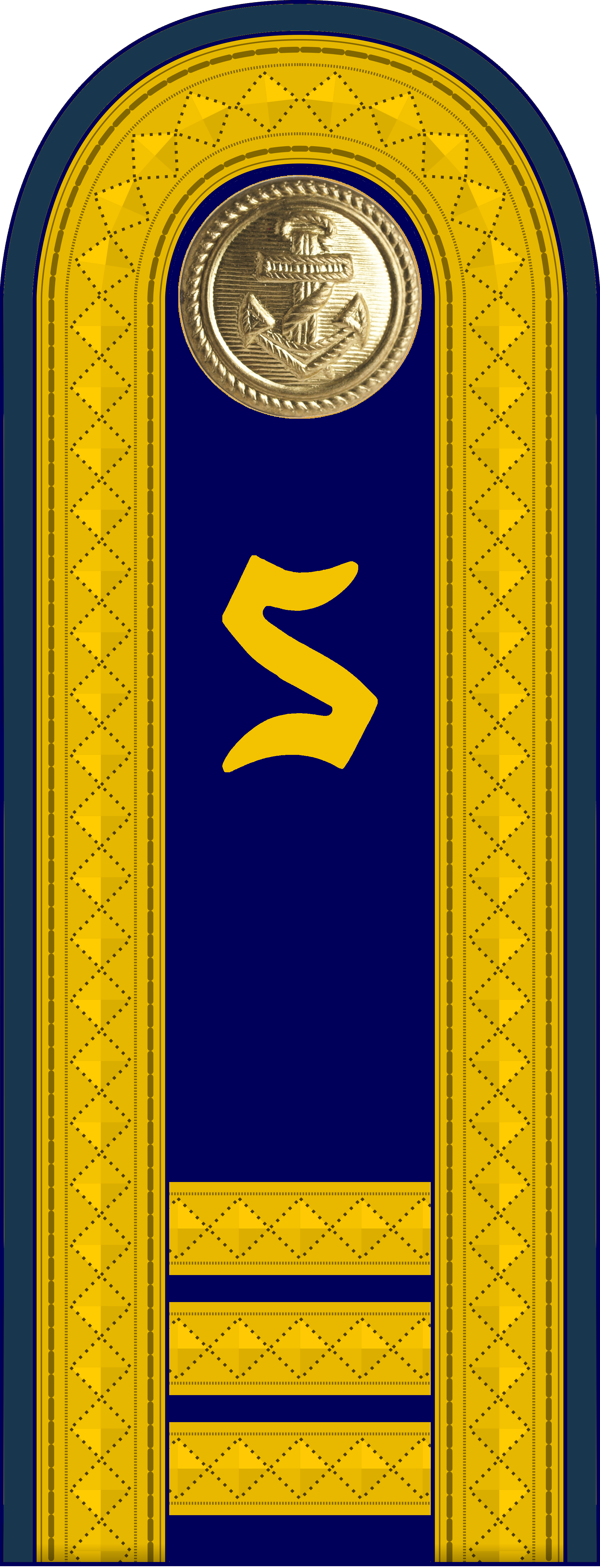
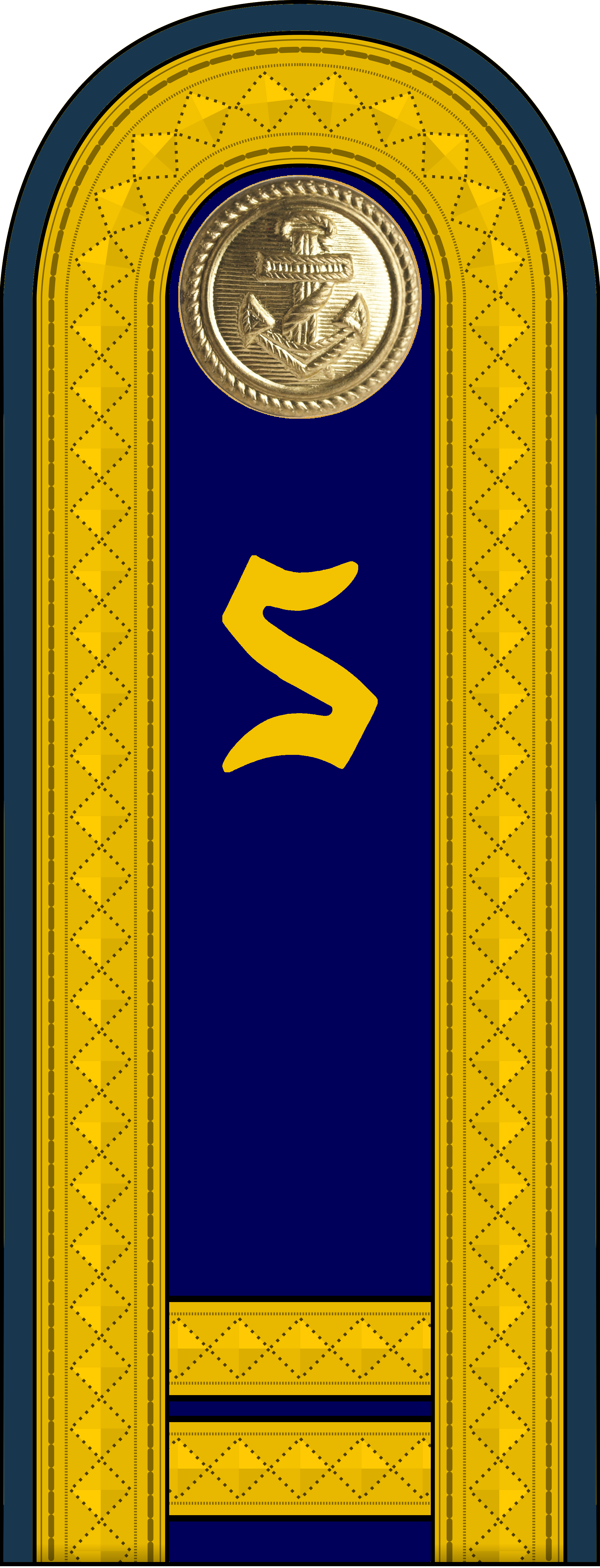
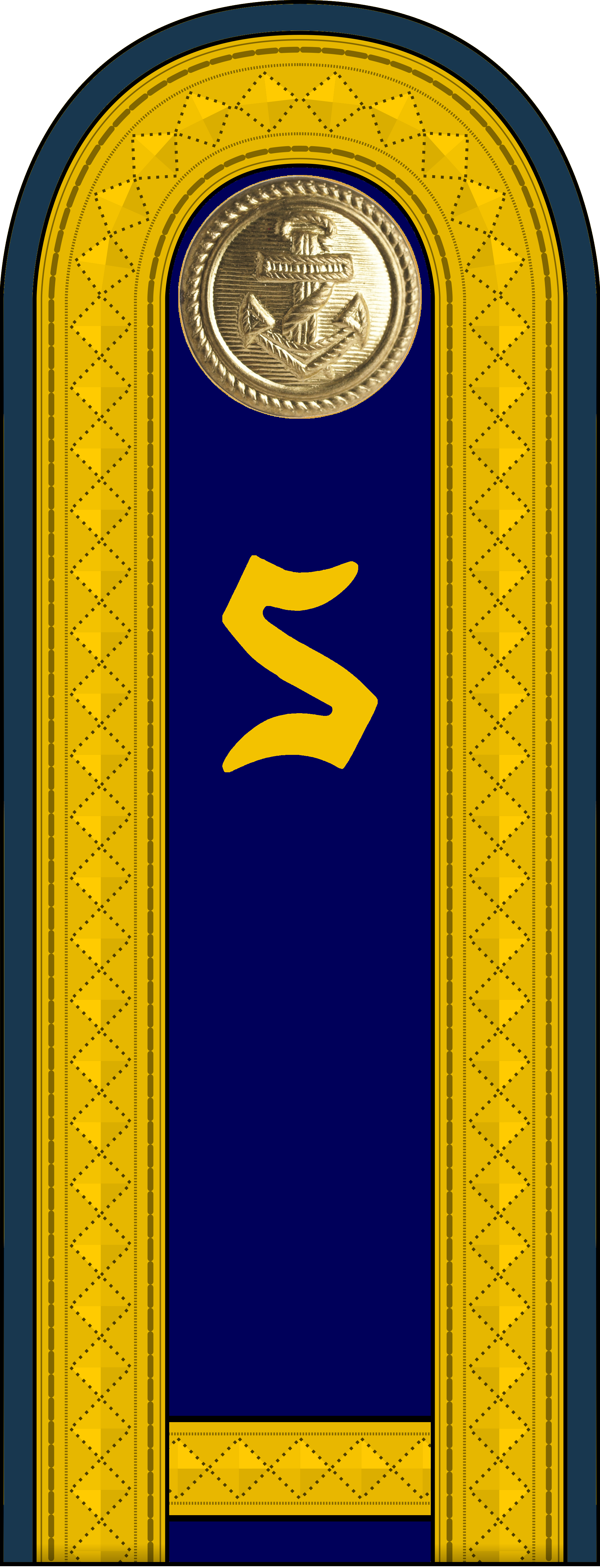
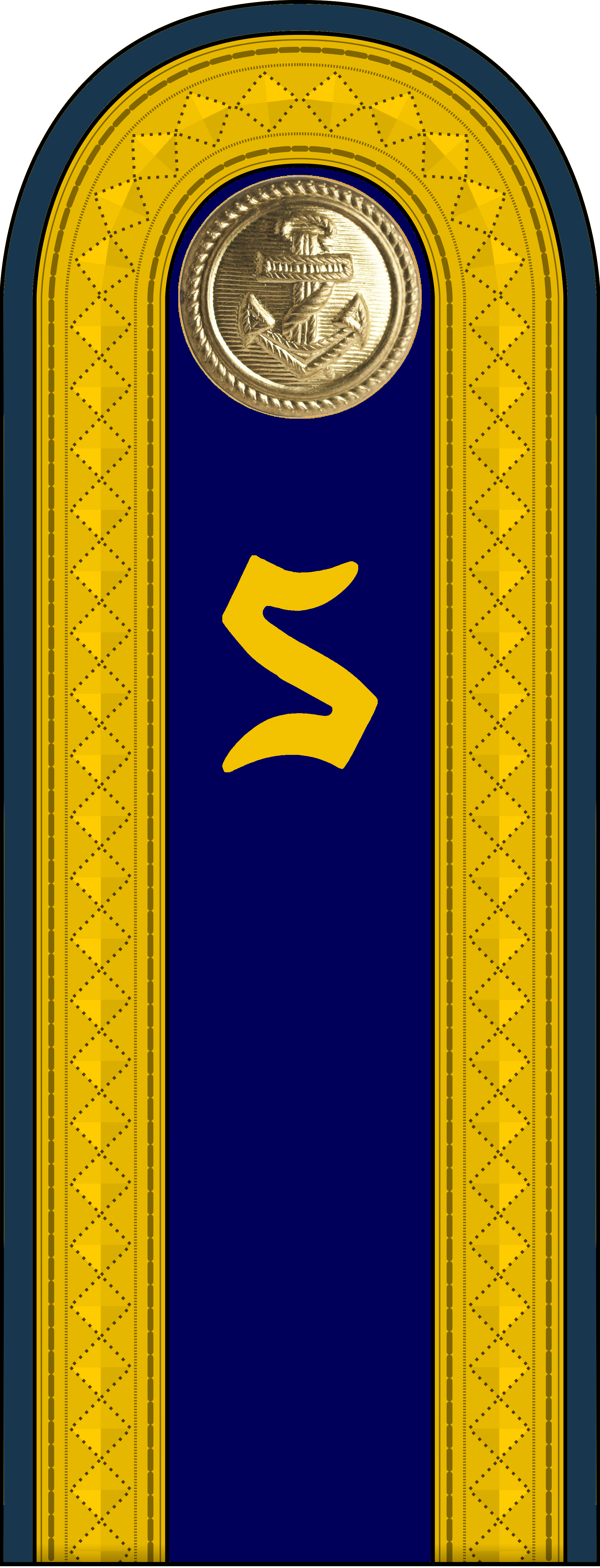
Offiziersschüler
Academic year	6th	5th	4th	3rd	2nd	1st	Preparation course
Shoulder boards

=== Warrant officers ===
Fähnrichkorps and Fähnrichschüler of the NPA
Sleeve insignia (as to 1979–1990) (not to Fähnrich-student)	Stabsoberfähnrich	Stabsfähnrich	Oberfähnrich	Fähnrich	Fähnrichschüler
Sleeve insignia (as to 1979–1990) (not to Fähnrich-student)	W-4	W-3	W-2	W-1	W (Student)
	(Staff-senior-Warrant Officer)	(Staff-Warrant Officer)	(Senior-Warrant Officer)	(Warrant Officer)	(Warrant Officer-Cadet)

Sleeve insignia as to 1973-1979
20 years of service	15 years of service	10 years of service

=== Petty officers and sailors ===
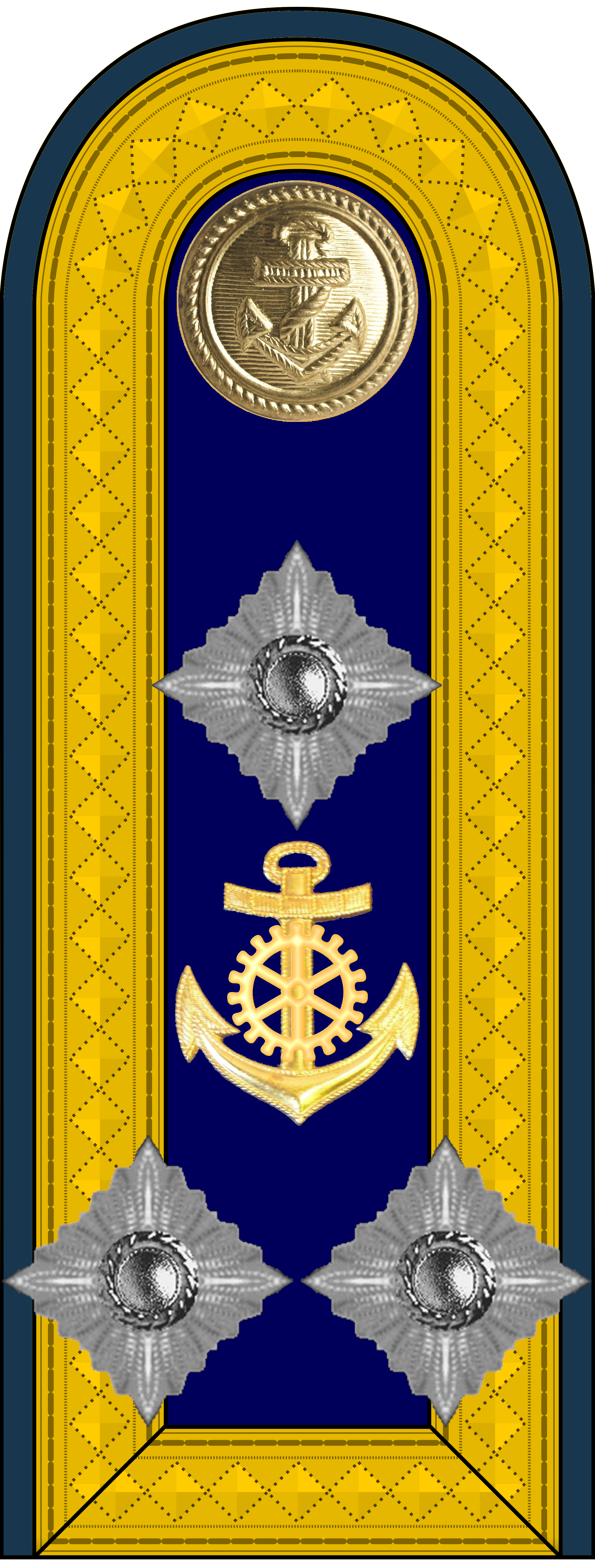
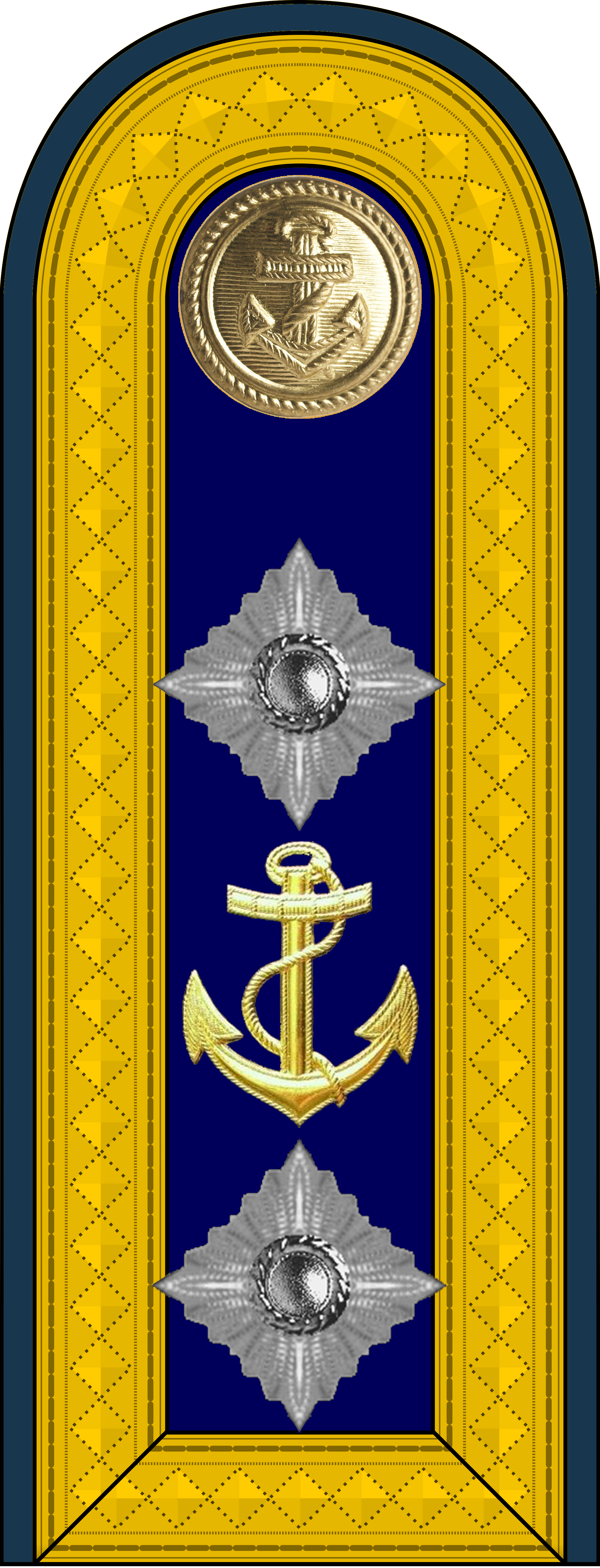
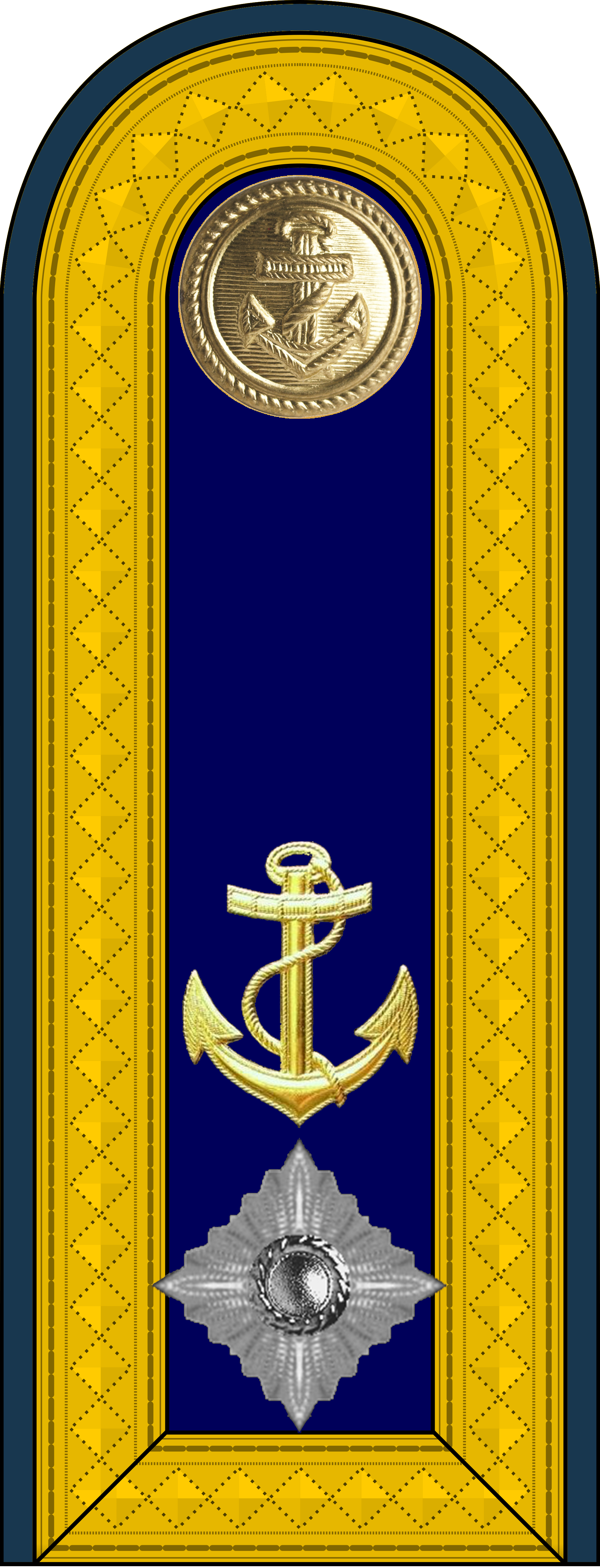
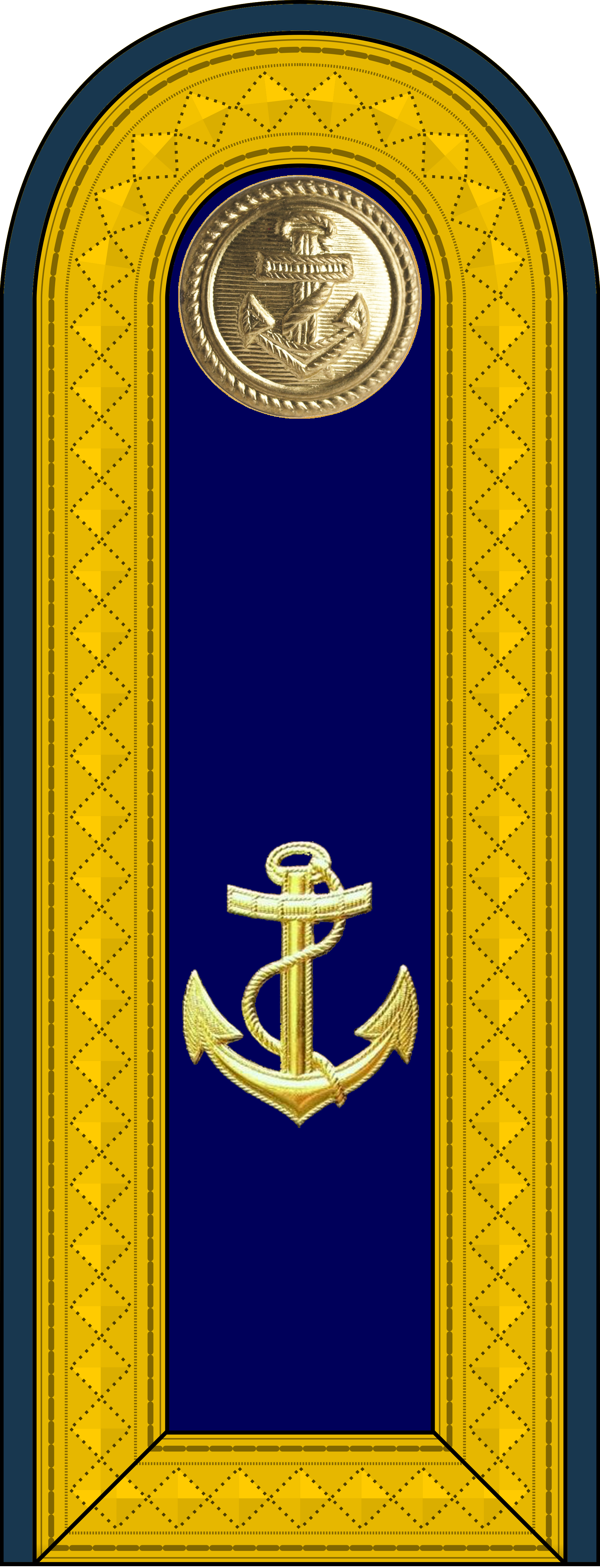
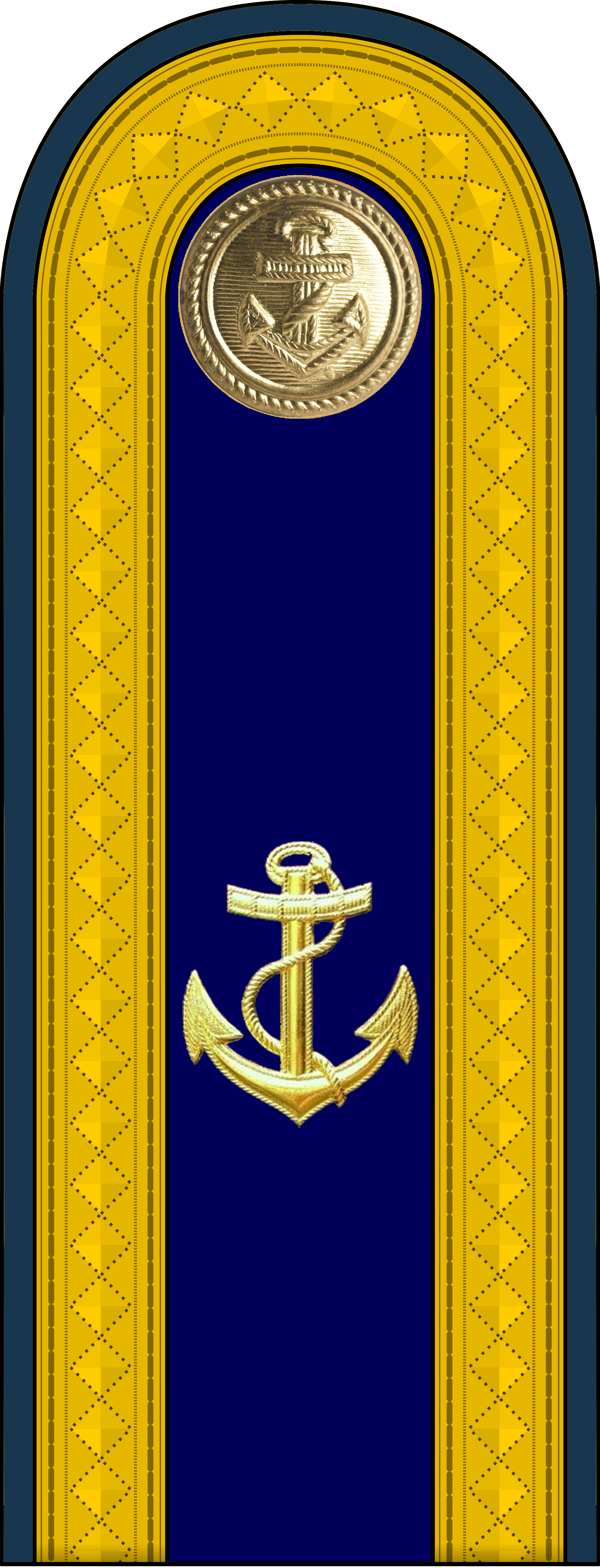
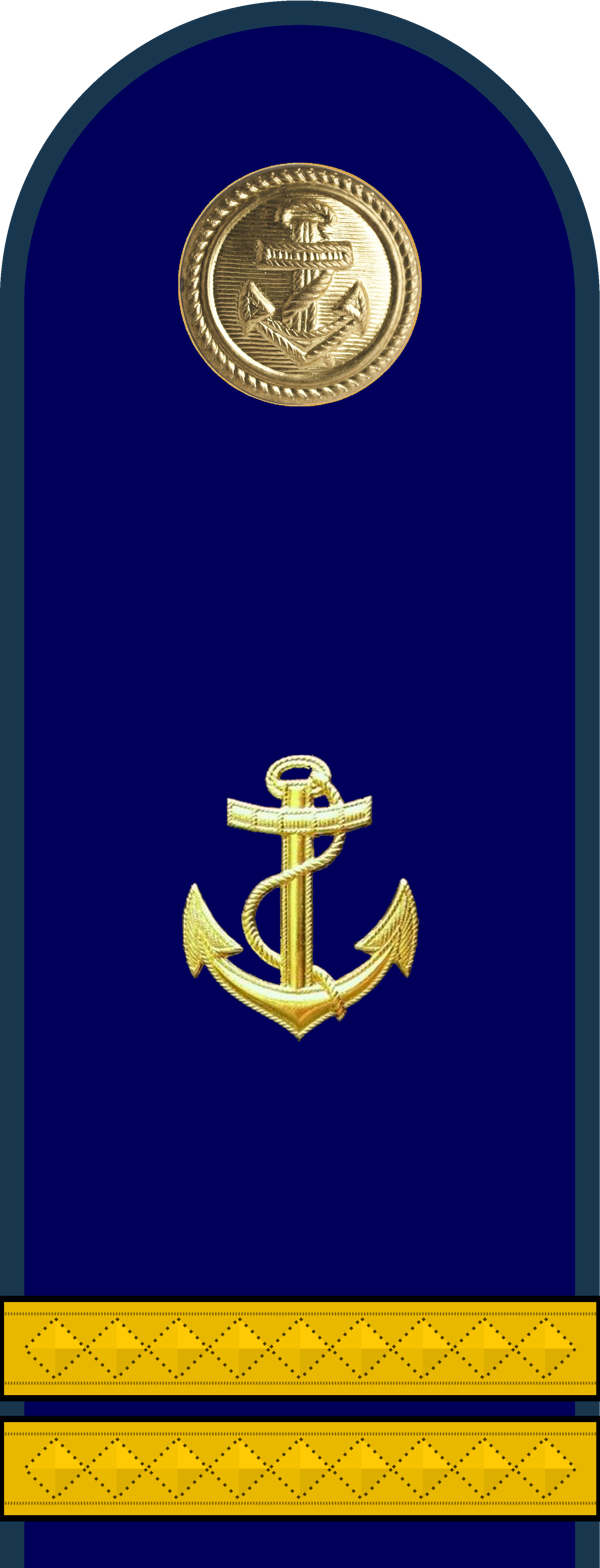
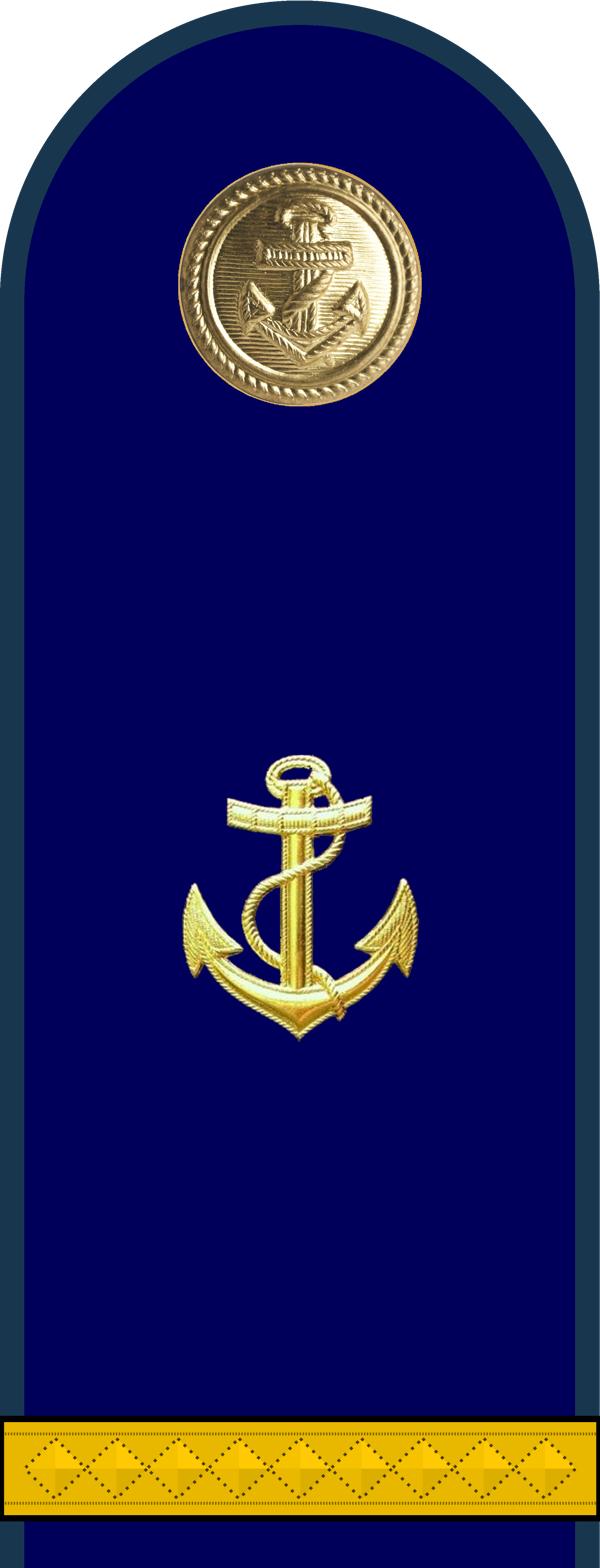
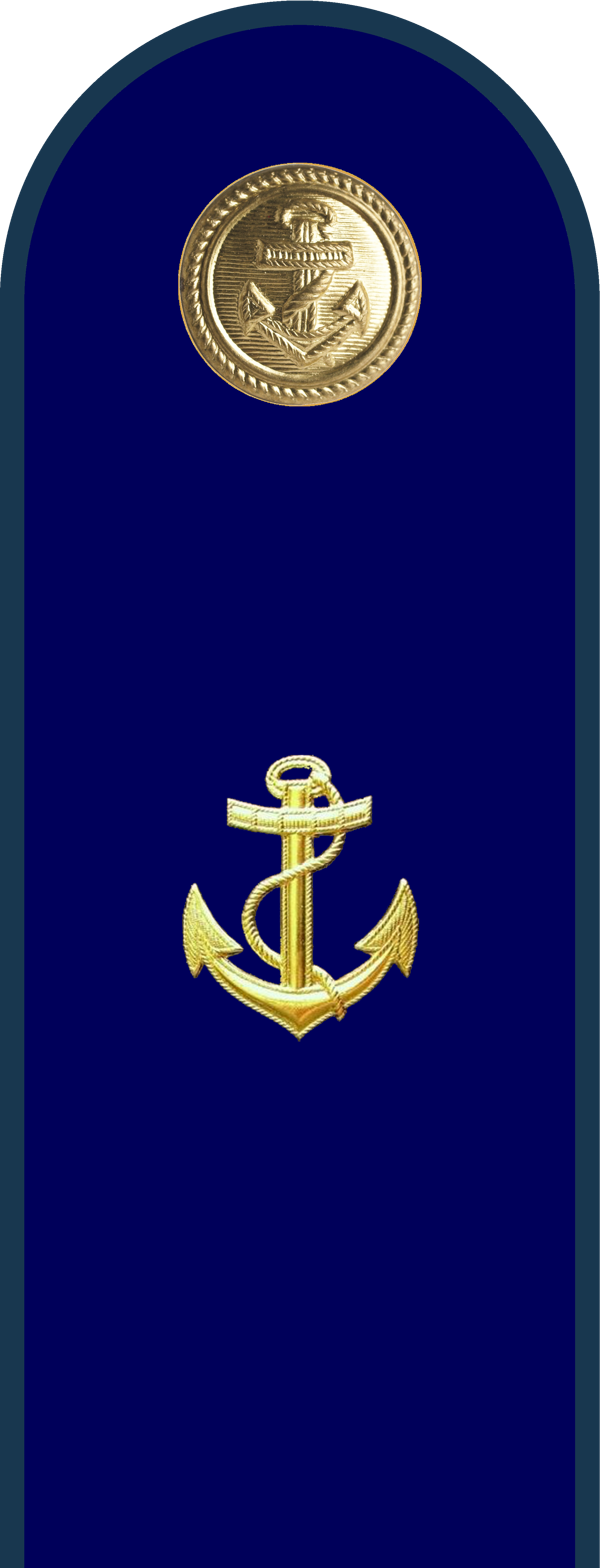
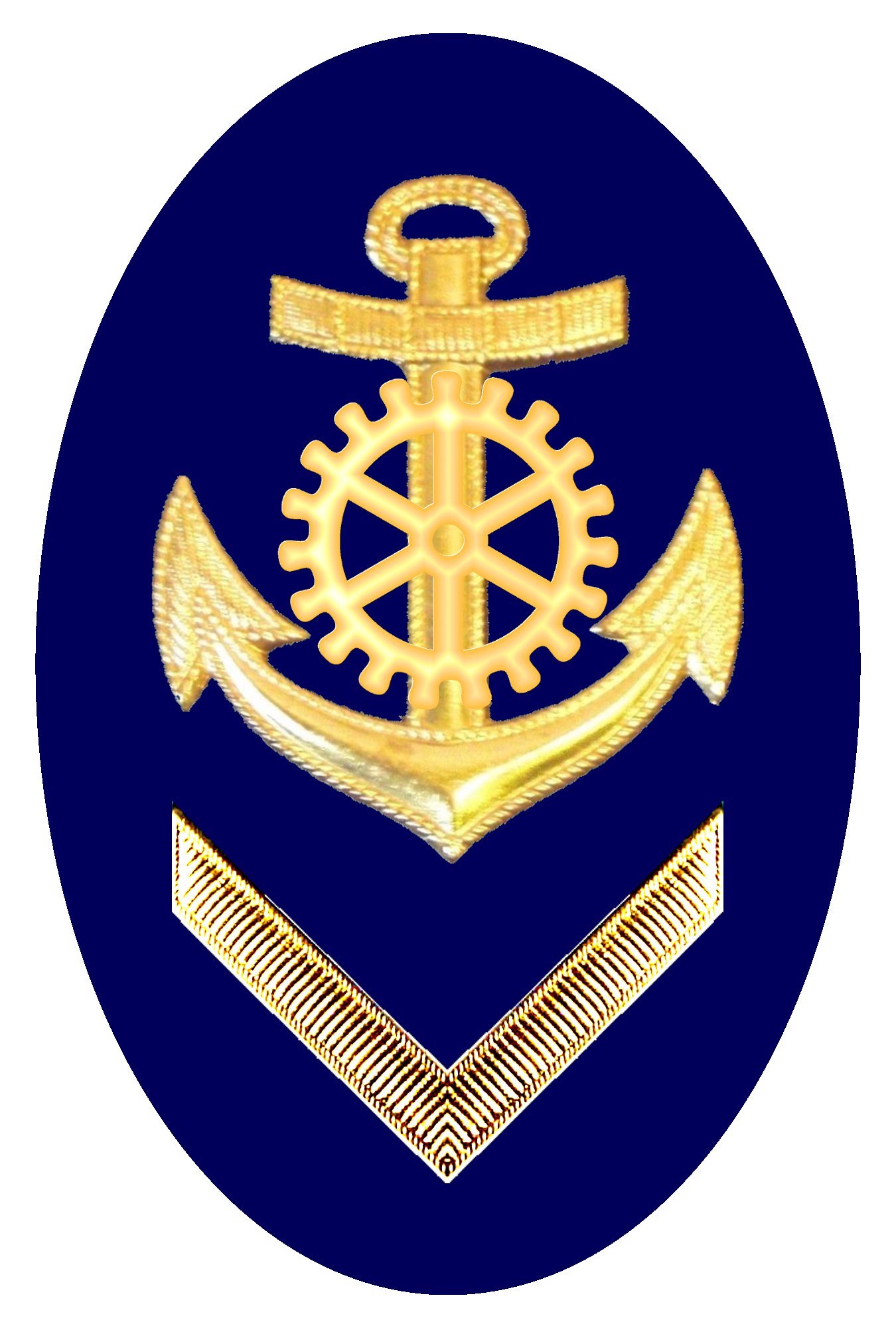
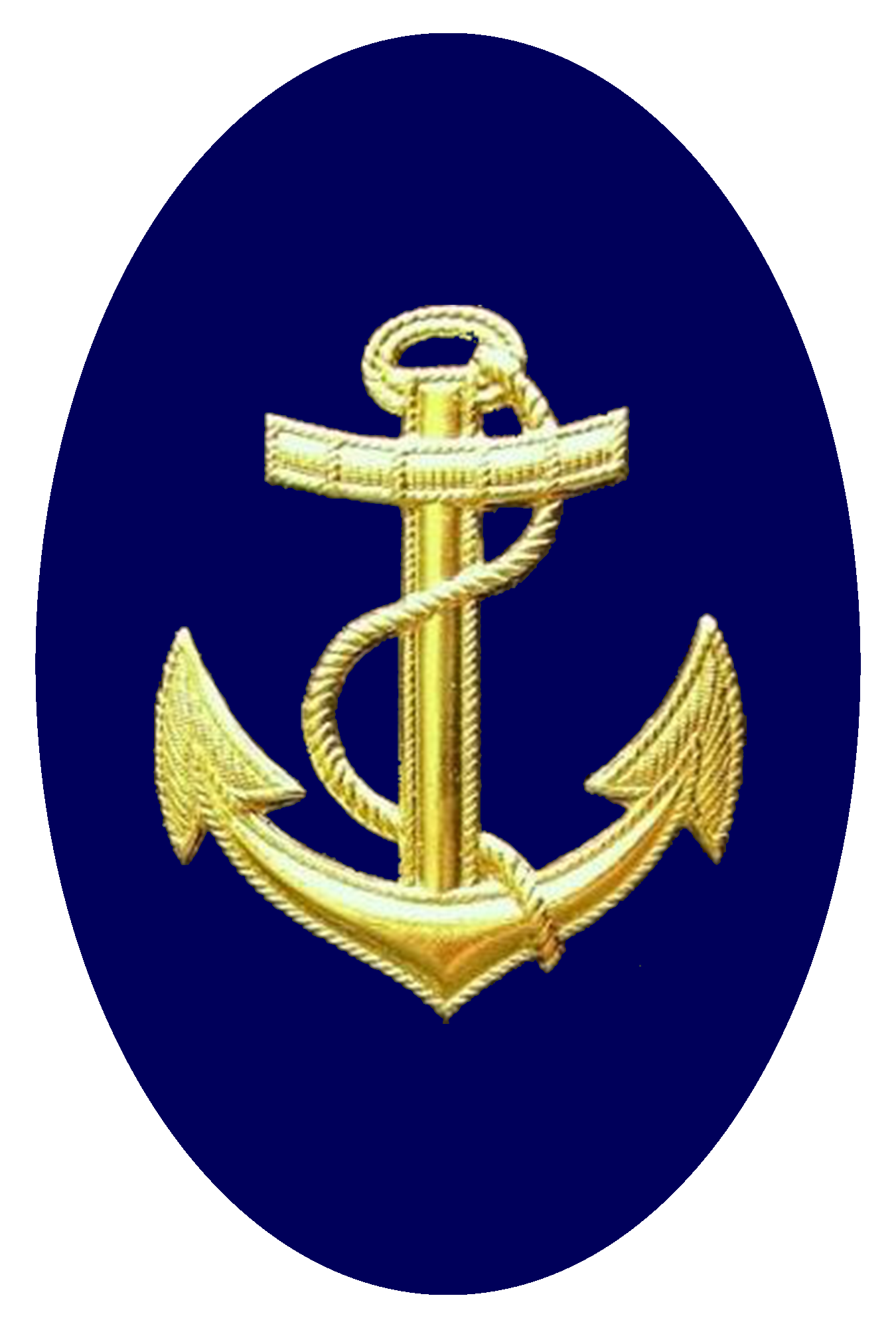
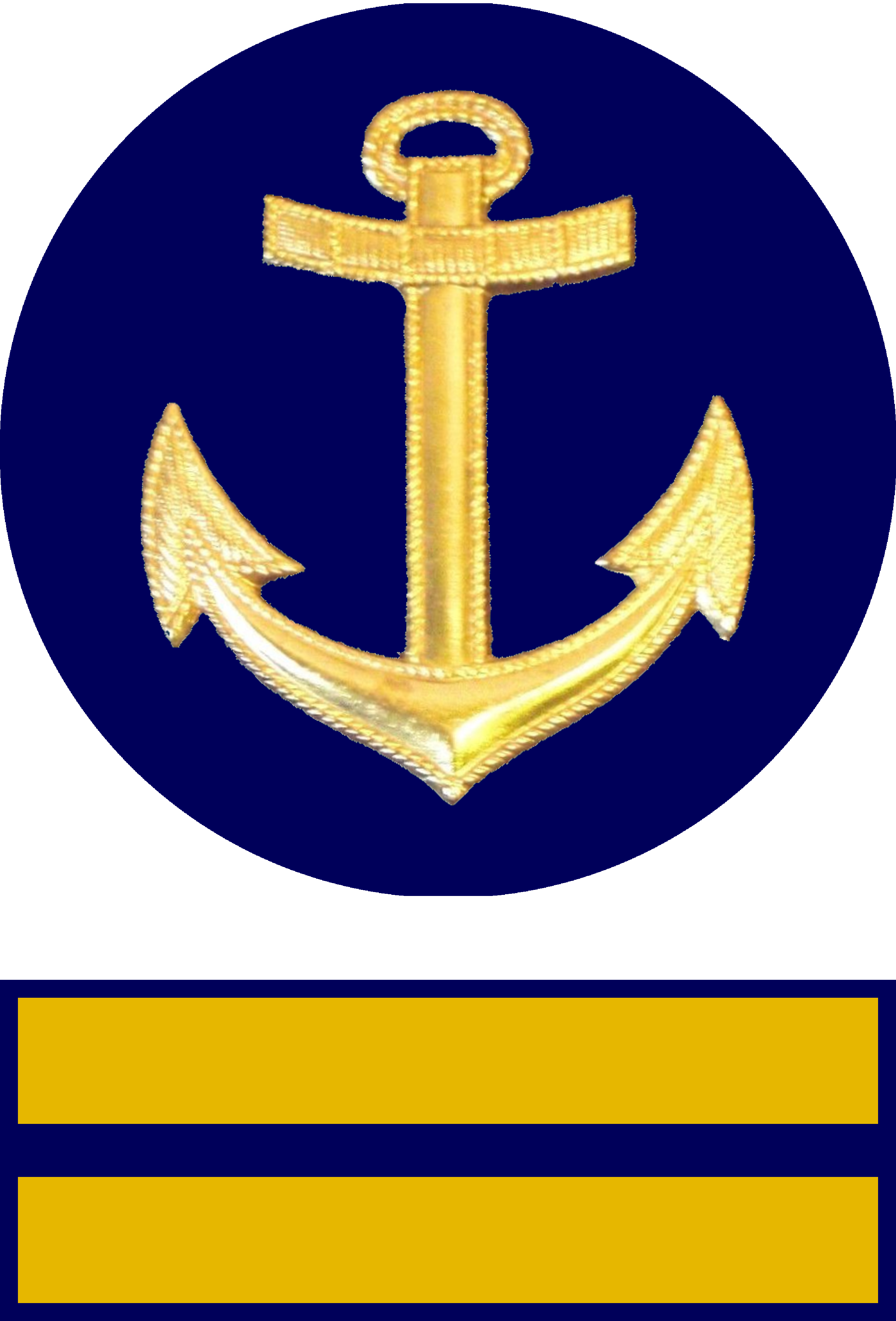
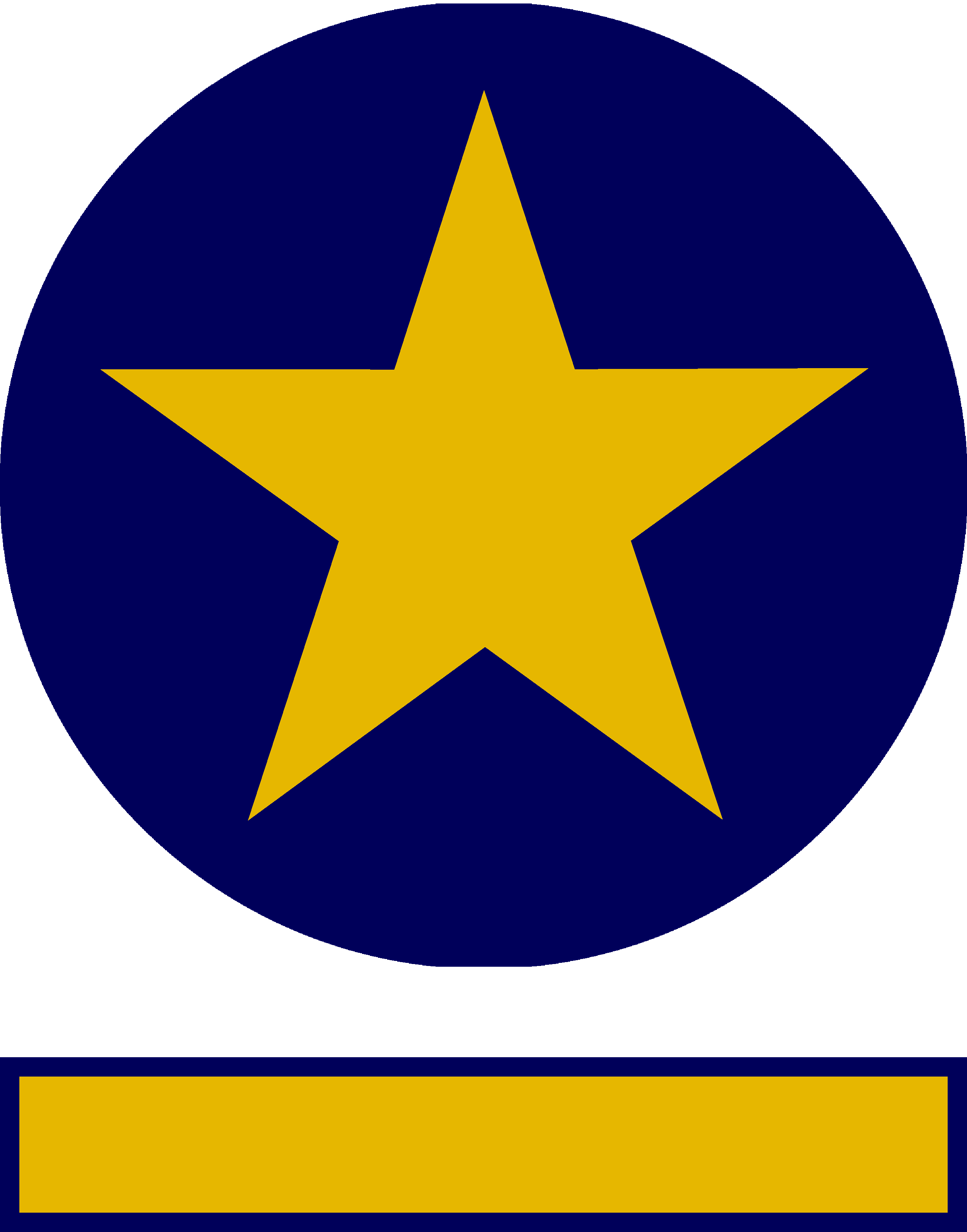
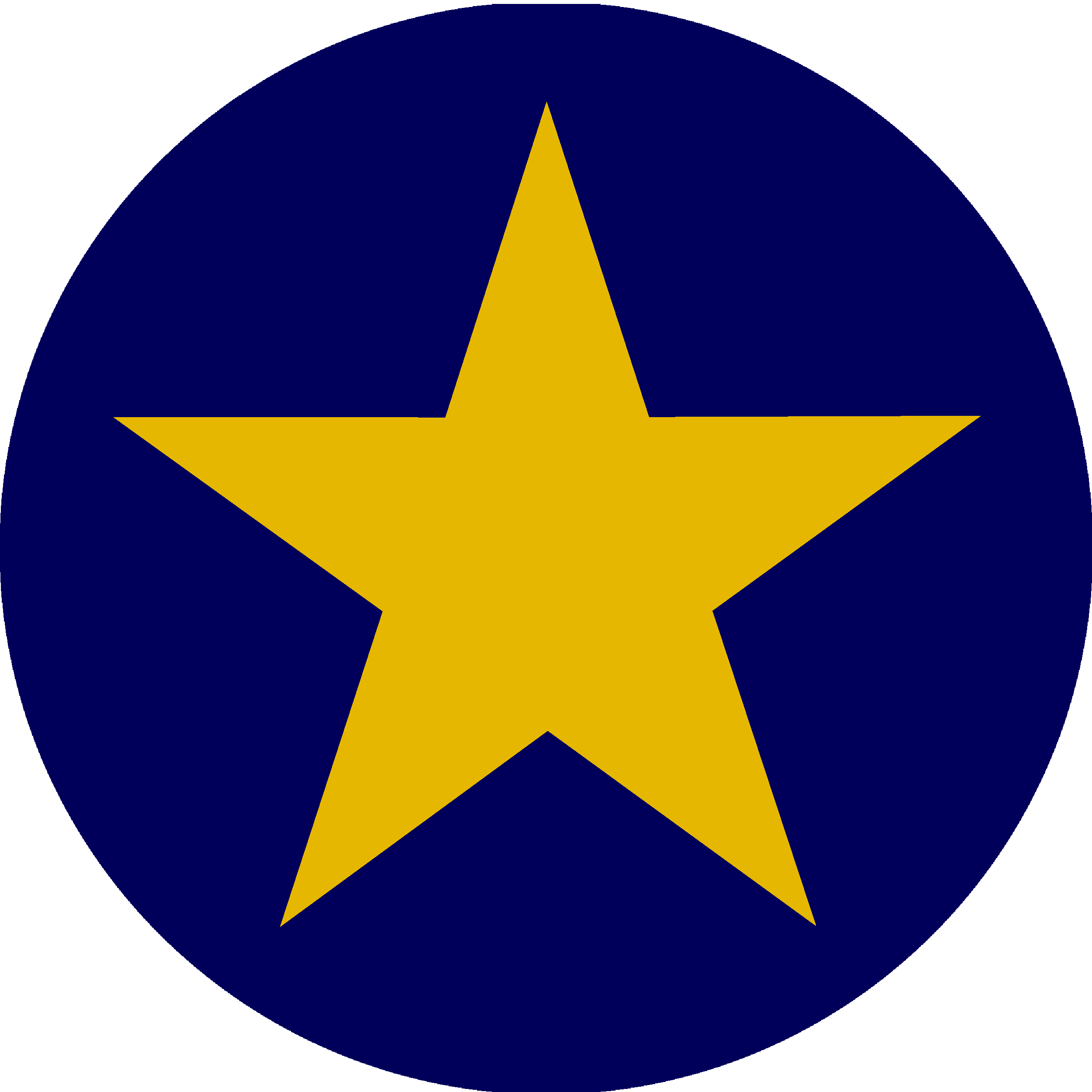
Rank group	Senior NCOs					Junior NCOs	Enlisted
Volksmarine
Volksmarine	Meister to Stabsobermeister wore the career insignia on shoulder straps only
Volksmarine	Stabsobermeister	Obermeister	Meister	Obermaat	Maat	Stabsmatrose	Obermatrose	Matrose

== Other insignia ==
=== Field insignia ===
Officers

Rank group	General officers				Field officers			Junior officers
Insignia
Ground and air forces	Armeegeneral	Generaloberst	Generalleutnant	Generalmajor	Oberst	Oberstleutnant	Major	Hauptmann	Oberleutnant	Leutnant	Unterleutnant

Enlisted

Rank group
Insignia
Ground and air forces	Stabsfeldwebel	Oberfeldwebel	Feldwebel	Unterfeldwebel/ Unteroffizier

=== Aviator and technician suit insignia, 1985-1990 ===
==== Officers ====
Rank group	General officers					Field officers			Junior officers
Insignia
Army, Air force	Marschall der DDR	Armeegeneral	Generaloberst	Generalleutnant	Generalmajor	Oberst	Oberstleutnant	Major	Hauptmann	Oberleutnant	Leutnant	Unterleutnant
Navy	Marschall der DDR	Flottenadmiral	Admiral	Vizeadmiral	Konteradmiral	Kapitän zur See	Fregattenkapitän	Korvettenkapitän	Kapitänleutnant	Oberleutnant zur See	Leutnant zur See	Unterleutnant zur See

==== Officer candidate ====
Rank group
Insignia
Ground, air forces & navy	4th year	3rd year	2nd year	1st year
Ground, air forces & navy	Offiziersschüler

==== Warrant officers ====
Rank group
Insignia
Ground, air forces & navy	Stabsoberfähnrich	Stabsfähnrich	Oberfähnrich	Fähnrich	2nd year	1st year
Ground, air forces & navy	Stabsoberfähnrich	Stabsfähnrich	Oberfähnrich	Fähnrich	Fähnrichschüler

==== Enlisted ====
Rank group	Senior NCOs			Junior NCOs			Enlisted
Insignia
Ground and air forces	Stabsfeldwebel	Oberfeldwebel	Feldwebel	Unterfeldwebel	Unteroffizier	Gefreiter UA	Stabsgefreiter	Gefreiter	Soldat
Navy	Stabsobermeister	Obermeister	Meister	Obermaat	Maat		Stabsmatrose	Obermatrose	Matrose

== See also ==
- Corps colours (NPA)
- Glossary of German military terms
