= Marshal of the German Democratic Republic =

Highest military rank in East Germany (1982–89)

Marshal of the German Democratic Republic Marschall der Deutschen Demokratischen Republik
- Technician suit insignia

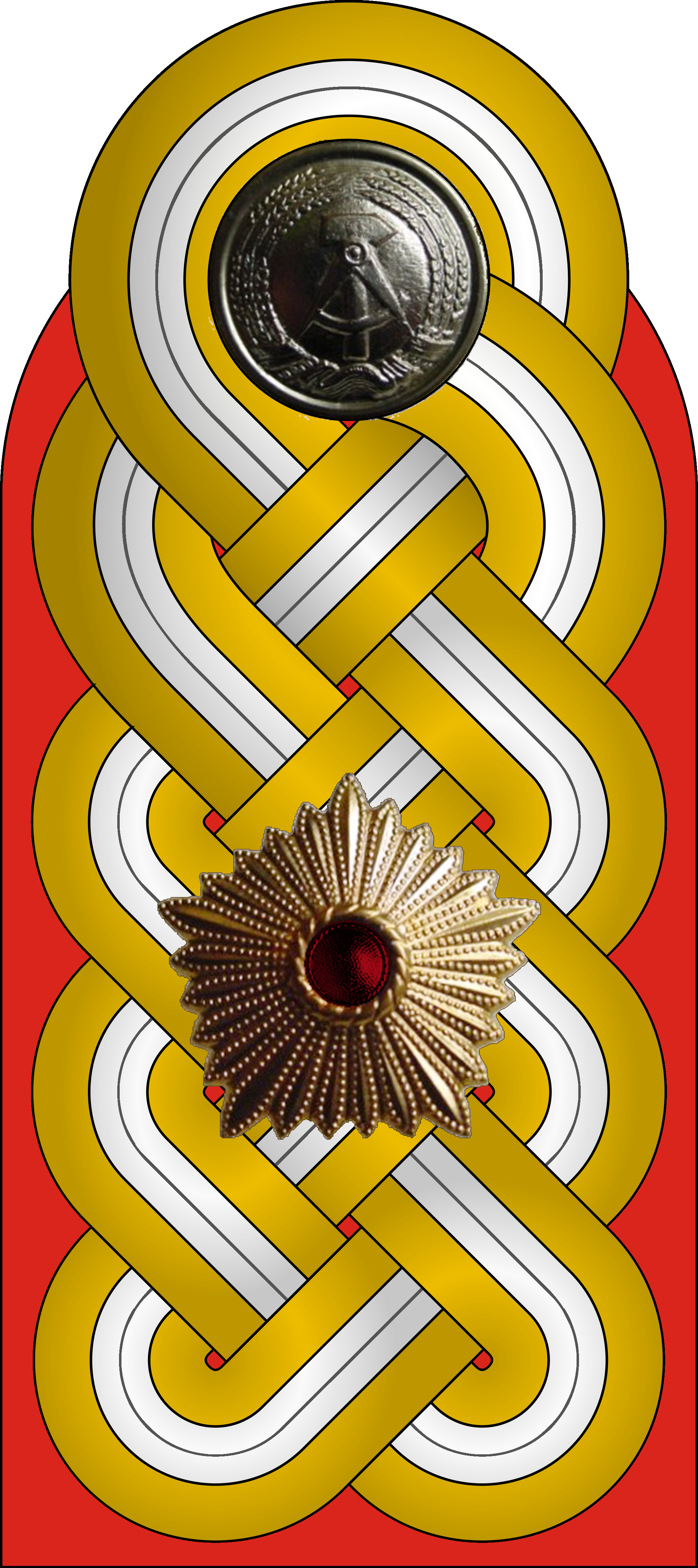
- Shoulder board
- Country: German Democratic Republic
- Service branch: Land Forces
- Abbreviation: Marschall der DDR
- Formation: 25 March 1982
- Abolished: November 1989
- Next lower rank: Army General

Marshal of the German Democratic Republic (German: Marschall der Deutschen Demokratischen Republik), was the highest rank in the National People's Army of the former German Democratic Republic (GDR). It was never held and was abolished in 1989.

== History ==
The rank of Marschall der DDR was established on 25 March 1982 by decree of the Staatsrat der DDR (State Council of the GDR), but never bestowed. The Staatsrat could promote a general to this rank for exceptional military achievement. The rank was an imitation of the supreme Soviet rank, that of Marshal of the Soviet Union.

Some believe that this rank would only have been granted in wartime and was created as a result of changes in Warsaw Pact military planning. During wartime, a Marschall der DDR was to command an operational army group that included all East German forces including Police and Stasi troops. Prior to this change, all East German forces were under the direct control of the Soviet military command.

In November 1989, the acting Minister for National Defense, Admiral Theodor Hoffmann, abolished this rank.

== Design ==
Several designs were considered for the Marshal shoulder board. The final design was a shoulder board 118 mm long and 48 mm wide consisting of interlaced gold and silver cord backed by a red cloth material on which was placed a five-pointed, gilded star with a red ruby in the center. According to Klaus Wather's Uniformeffekten der bewaffneten Organe der DDR Band II, 12 pairs of these shoulder boards were made.

Drawings were also made of a Soviet-style "Marshal's star" to be worn on a red neck ribbon but this item was never produced.

Also planned were Marshal rank insignia for the new field uniform. This consisted of a 90 x 60 mm rectangular badge of stone-grey cloth for mounting on the upper uniform sleeve. On this badge was woven a large five-pointed gold colored star with a red center over a 20 mm long horizontal gold bar. For the cap there was an oval badge 50 × 30 mm with the same design as the sleeve insignia.

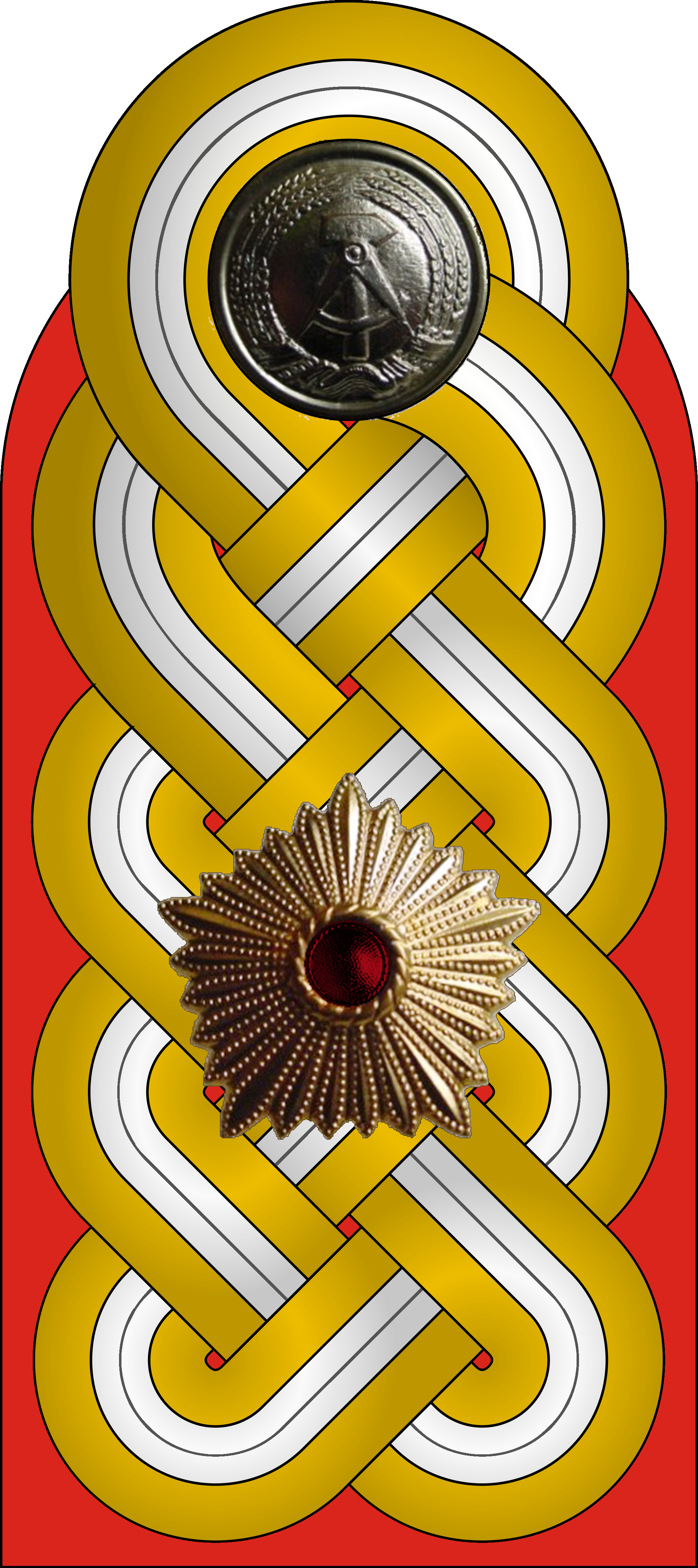
Shoulder board

Collar patches

Field uniform cap insignia

== See also ==
- Military ranks of East Germany
- Corps colours (NPA)
