= Stabsfähnrich (East Germany) =

Military rank in the National People's Army of East Germany from 1979 to 1990

Stabsfähnrich

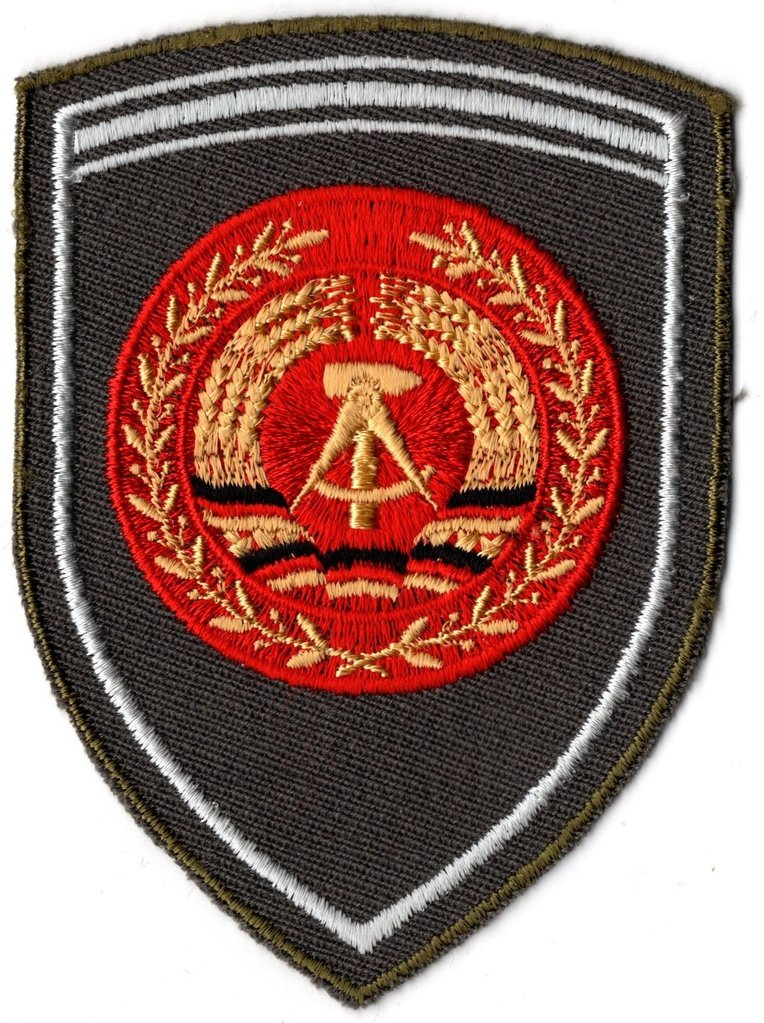
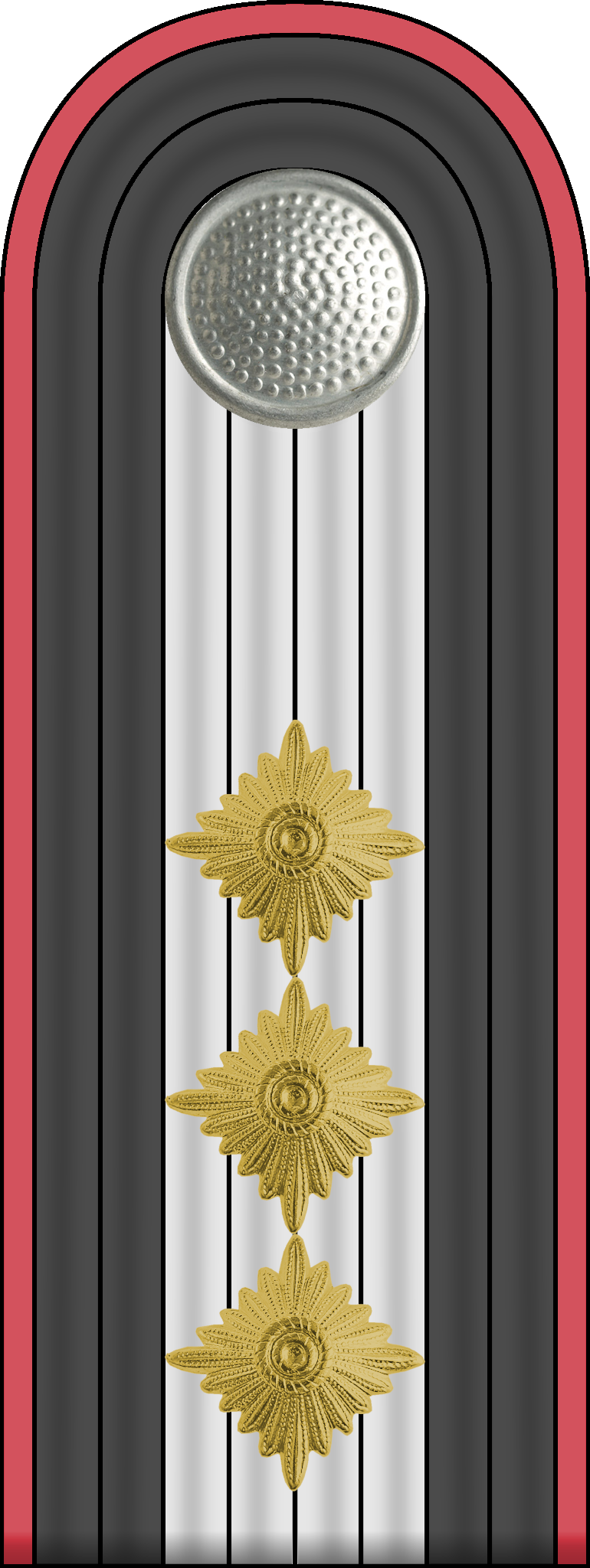
sleeve badge / shoulder board

Rank insignia
NPA Fänrich rank
Utilisation
1979-1990
Rank group
Fähnrich
Army, Air Force, Navy
Stabsfähnrich
NATO
equivalent
WO-3

Stabsfähnrich (short: StFähnr / in lists: SFR; en: Staff-fähnrich) was a military rank in the Army of the German Democratic Republic (GDR) from 1979 to 1990.

Stabsfähnrich did belong to the autonomous "Fähnrich rank group" between commissioned officer (CO) and non-commissioned officer (NCO) ranks. The position of the "Fähnrich rank group" might have been compared to the Warrant Officer (WO) rank group in Anglophone armed forces.

The bottom up approach in that rank group was as follows:

- Fähnrich WO-1, (en: Fähnrich)
- Oberfähnrich (WO-2), (Senior-fähnrich)
- Stabsfähnrich WO-3, (Staff-fähnrich)
- Stabsoberfähnrich WO-4, (Staff-senior-fähnrich)

junior rank Oberfähnrich	(NPA rank); Stabsfähnrich	senior rank Stabsoberfähnrich

rank insignia Volksmarin

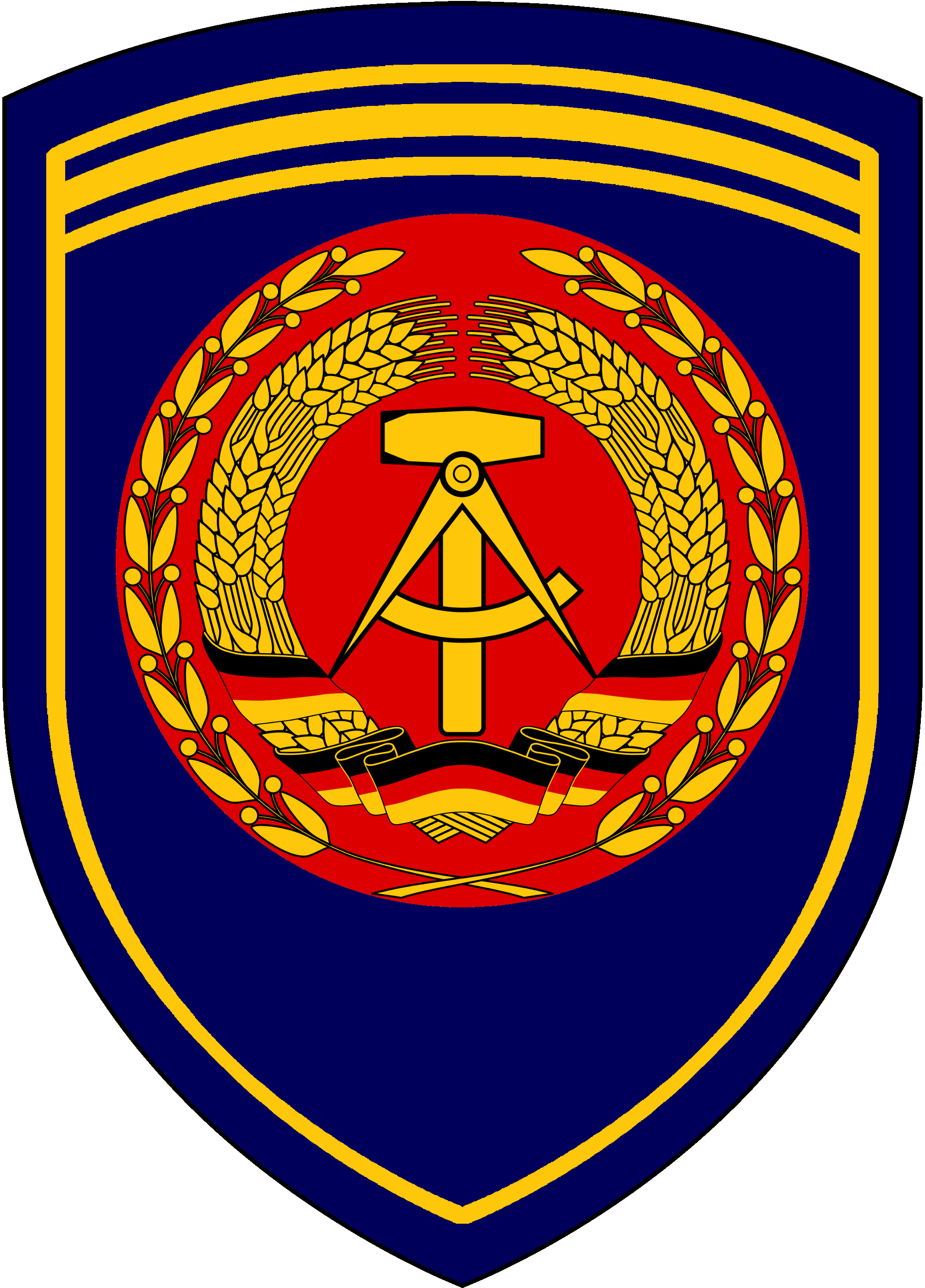
sleeve badge

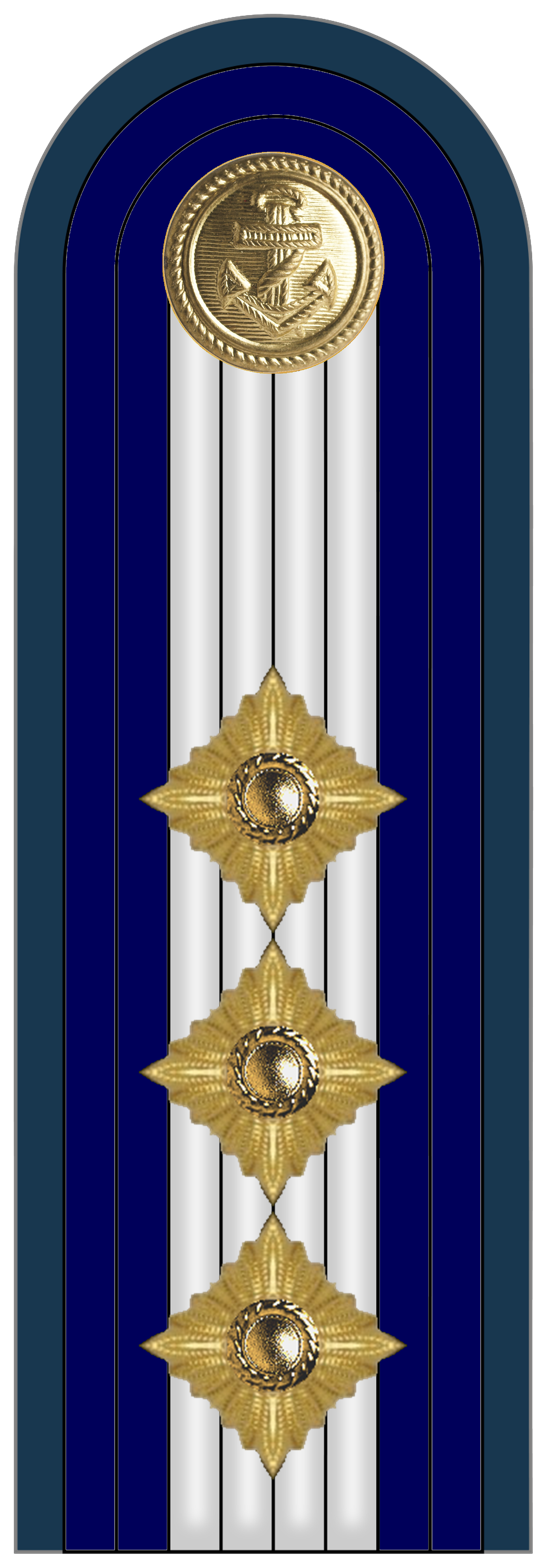
shoulder board

corps colour
(naval blue)
