= Army general (East Germany) =

Military rank

Army general Armeegeneral
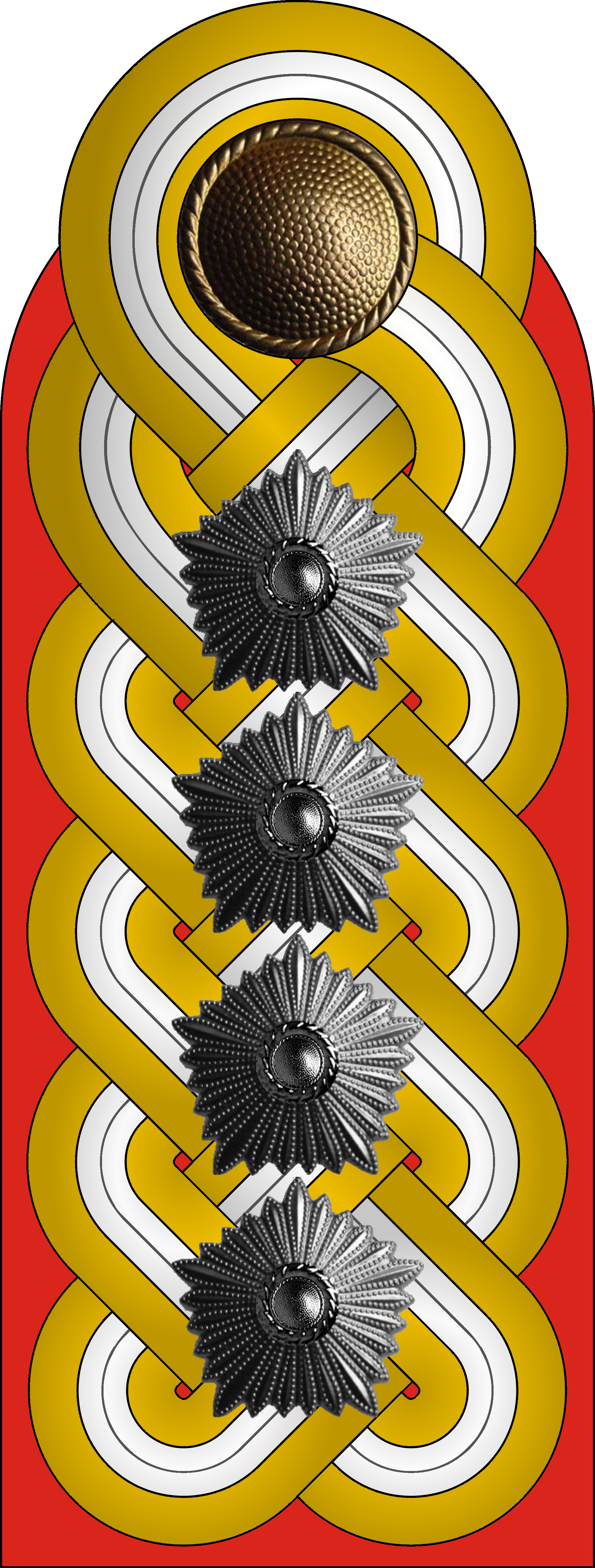
- Collar patches / shoulder board

- Insignia worn on camo uniforms
- Country: German Democratic Republic
- Service branch: National People's Army; Stasi; Volkspolizei
- Formation: 1 March 1956
- Abolished: 2 October 1990
- Next higher rank: Marshal of the German Democratic Republic
- Next lower rank: Generaloberst
- Equivalent ranks: Flottenadmiral

Army general (German: Armeegeneral), was the highest peacetime general officer rank in the so-called Armed Organs of the GDR (Bewaffnete Organe der DDR), that is, the Ministry of National Defence, the Stasi, and the Ministry of the Interior. It is comparable to the four-star rank in many NATO armed forces. It was aligned with Soviet military doctrine and other armed forces of the Warsaw Pact.

The rank was reserved to minister level exclusively. Consequently, in the National People's Army service branches, Landstreitkräfte, Luftstreitkräfte/Luftverteidigung, Border troops, and Volksmarine there was no equivalent. However, if a Navy flag officer was designated or appointed Minister of National Defence he would be promoted to Flottenadmiral. When the armed organs of the GDR were disbanded in October 1990, the rank was abolished.

== Rankholders ==
East German officers who achieved the rank were:

Name	Portrait	Position	Year of Rank
Willi Stoph		Minister of National Defence	1959
Heinz Hoffmann		Minister of National Defence	1961
Erich Mielke		Minister for State Security	1980
Friedrich Dickel		Minister of Interior	1984
Heinz Keßler		Minister of National Defence	1985

== Insignia ==
Armeegeneral / Flottenadmiral (OF-9)
GDR MFS	GDR MOD	GDR Ministry of Interior
Armeegeneral	Flottenadmiral	Armeegeneral

== Army general in other countries ==
The rank widely used in other armed forces of socialist countries, such as:

- Bulgaria: Армейски генерал (Armeyski general)
- Czechoslovakia: Armádní generál / Armádny Generál
- Hungary: Hadseregtábornok
- Poland: Generał armii
- Romania: General de armată
- Soviet Union: Генерал армии (General armii)
- Yugoslavia: Генерал армије

Junior Rank; Generaloberst	GDR; Armeegeneral (Flottenadmiral)	Senior rank Marshal of the GDR (wartime only)

== See also ==
- General (Germany)
- Military ranks of East Germany
- Corps colours (NPA)

== Bibliography ==
- Keubke, Klaus-Ulrich; Kunz, Manfred (2005). Militärische Uniformen in der DDR 1949–1990 (in German). E.S. Mittler & Sohn. ISBN 978-3-8132-0915-0.
- Wollert, Günter (1984). NVA Kalender 1985 (in German). Militärverlag der DDR.
