= Unterleutnant =

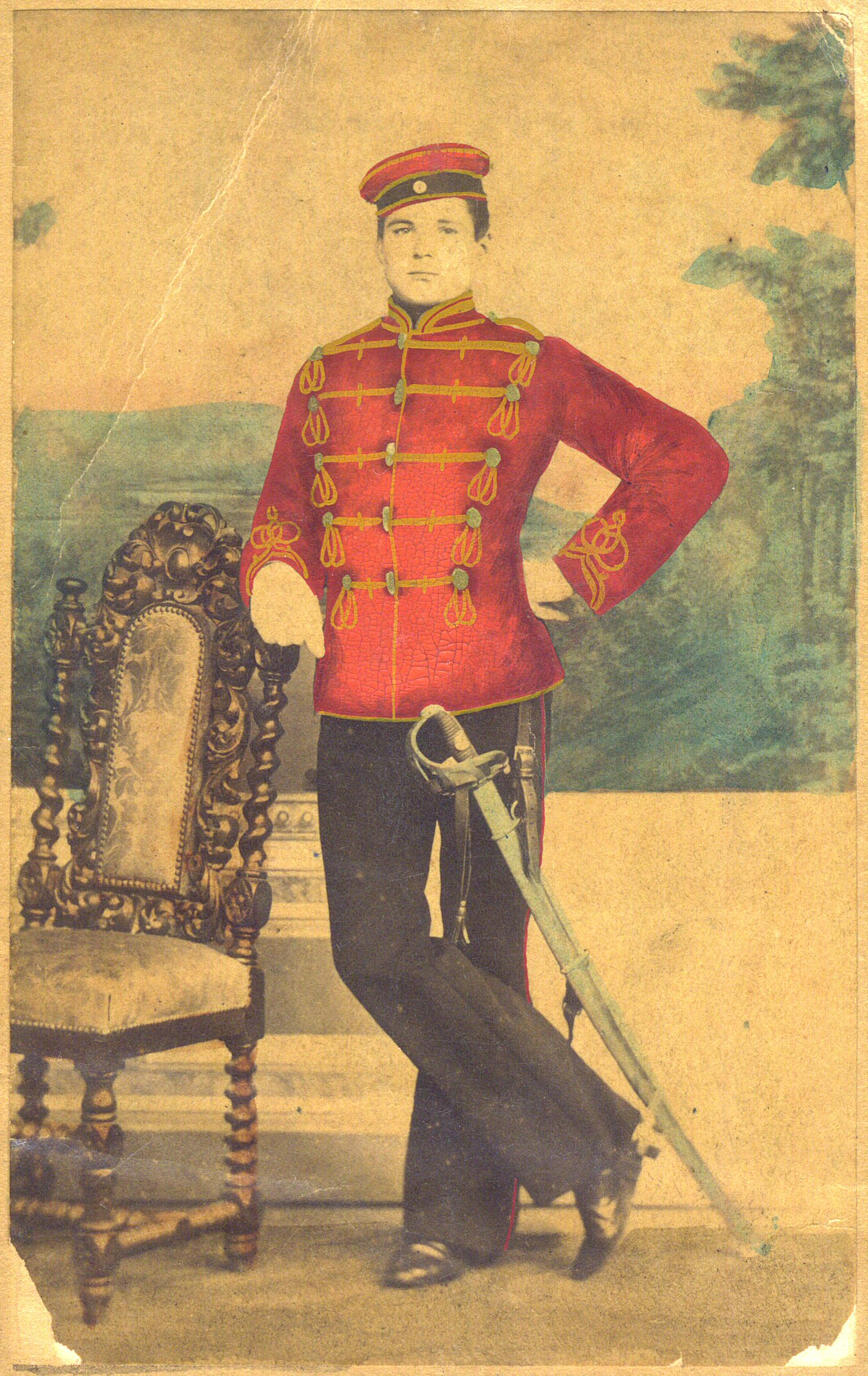
Prussian "Unterleutnant" (1870)

Unterleutnant (NPA-original abbreviation Ultn.; German: Unterleutnant, lit. 'under-lieutenant' or 'sub-lieutenant') was an officer rank of the armies of East Germany and other nations. The rank was first introduced in 1662–74 by France and was also adopted by some other countries' armed forces. In the East German National People's Army from 1956 to 1990, Unterleutnant was the lowest commissioned officer rank. It belonged to the rank group of lieutenants or subaltern officers. The equivalent rank of the Volksmarine was Unterleutnant zur See (en: "sub-lieutenant at sea").

== Germany ==
=== Empire, Weimar Republic, Third Reich, Federal Republic ===
In a number of German armed forces of the 19th century before German unification in 1871 there was the following graduation: Oberleutnant (Premierlieutenant) and Leutnant (Secondelieutenant); without the rank Unterleutnant.

However, until 1898 there was the rank Unterleutnant zur See in the Imperial German Navy. This rank was equivalent to the Secondelieutenant of the Imperial German Army (de: deutsches Heer).

In the Reichswehr, Wehrmacht, and Bundeswehr there was never a rank Unterleutnant.

=== German Democratic Republic ===
==== National People´s Army ====
Unterleutnant (Ultn.)

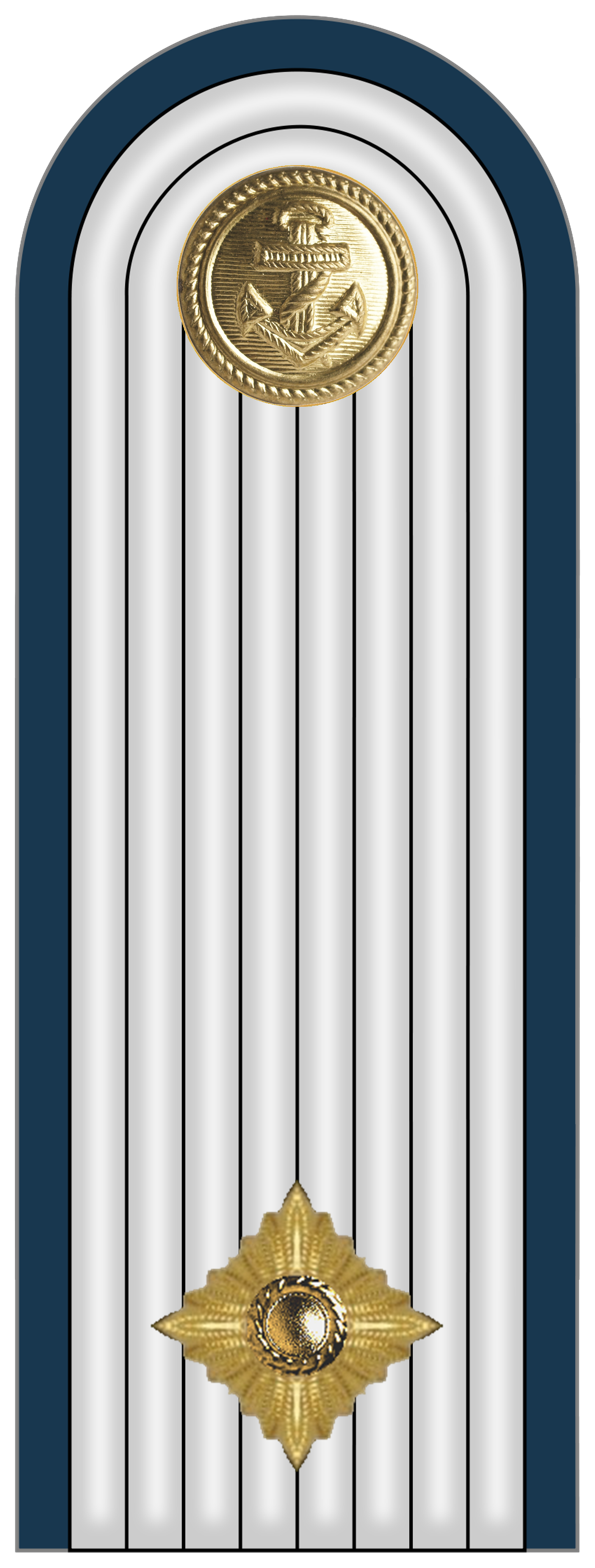
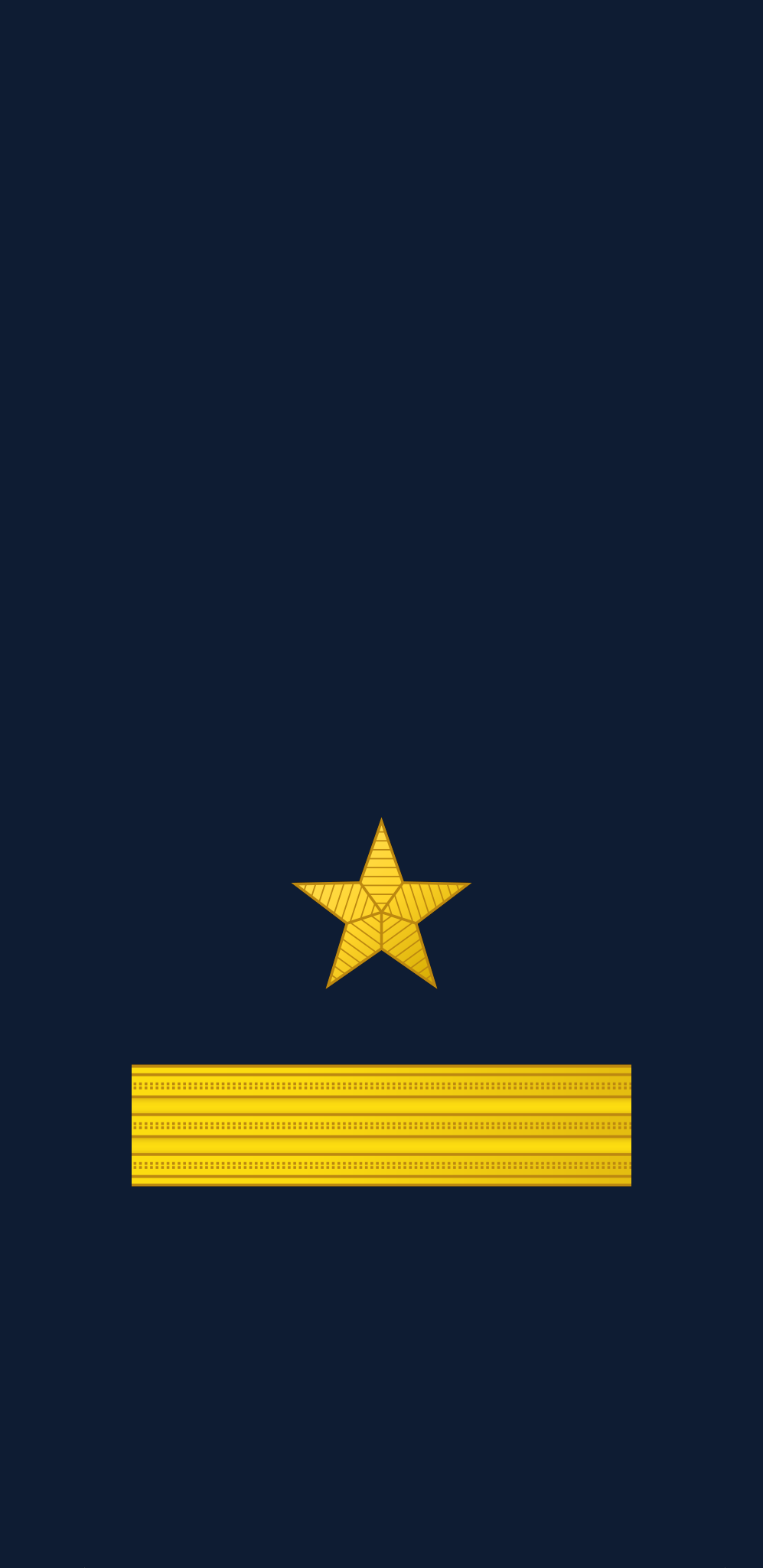
Engineer corps / Volksmarine

Rank insignia
NPA officer rank
Introduction
1956
Rank group
Commissioned officers
Army / Air Force
Unterleutnant
Navy
Unterleutnant zur See

Depending on the former Soviet military doctrine as well as to the other armed forces of the Warsaw Pact, in the so-called GDR armed organizations, the Unterleutnant was the lowest officer rank.

In the NPA and in the GDR border troops the lieutenant officer sub-rank group consisted of Oberleutnant, Leutnant and Unterleutnant.

This officer rank could be assigned to military appointments as follows: officer of the operations service, political officer, officer of the technical service, supply, procurement, and military justice service.

Graduation to that particular officer rank was normally possible depending on the officer's education and training. Promotion to the following Leutnant rank was achievable after two years of service, and to Hauptmann (captain) after three more years.

After successfully passing out of the officer course (normally three years) on a NPA officers' school, officer students (de: Offiziersschüler) normally graduated to the rank Unterleutnant. The best school-leavers of the appropriate course could be promoted to the next higher rank, Leutnant. On establishing of the final examination of the Officers' High schools and diploma course of study, all graduates were promoted to the rank of Leutnant.

The equivalent rank of the Volksmarine was initially Unterleutnant zur See. Later the designation was changed to Unterleutnant. However, in individual linguistic usage the traditional wording Unterleutnant zur See was used continuously.

==== Education ====
Since then the status of NPA persons in uniform with the rank Unterleutnant changed from professional soldier to longer-service volunteer (de: „Offizier auf Zeit“ – OaZ). The minimum service time was three years, and the so-called Abitur (en: final examination, qualifying for university entrance) was mandatory. In 1982 the minimum service time was raised to four years. Normally the one year lasting military education and study had to be accomplished on an officer's high school. By passing the final examination, the aspirant could be promoted to the Unterleutnat rank. This was followed by the first line officer assignment in one of the NPA services or branches of service. An Unterleutnant could usually be appointed to platoon leader. Pertaining to special abilities, knowledge, or qualification – special assignment could be possible as well.

Under certain circumstances, e.g. successful completion of a reserve officer's training course during high school study, suitable graduates could be appointed to Unterleutnant of the Reserve (de: Unterleutnant der Reserve).

In some cases particular able Stabsfeldwebel or Fähnrich (NPA) could be appointed to Unterleutnant.

junior rank Stabsoberfähnrich	National People's Army rank Unterleutnant (Unterleutnant zur See)	senior rank Leutnant

==== Volkspolizei ====
In the GDR Volkspolizei Unterleutnant der VP (official: "Unterleutnant der Deutschen Volkspolizei DVP") was the lowest commissioned officer rank as well. Normally officer students, graduated from officer's training course, could be promoted to that rank. However, the best graduate of the particular year could be promoted to the next higher rank, Leutnant of the VP.

Members of the GDR Ministry of Interior, graduated from the Ministry of Interior Officers high school "Artur Becker", another high school facility or university, were normally promoted to Leutnant of the VP. Depending on the course of study, duration, and academic or university degree, achieved, promotion to higher ranks could be possible.

== Other countries ==
=== Sweden ===
The underlöjtnant rank was introduced in 1835 to replace the former fänrik and kornett ranks, and until 1926 was the lowest commissioned officer rank of the Swedish Armed Forces. The fänrik rank was reintroduced in 1914 with the same status as underlöjtnant, but it was subsequently moved one level below underlöjtnant in 1926. Underlöjtnant was removed from the Swedish Armed Forces rank structure in 1937.

== See also ==
- Ranks of the National People's Army
- Ranks and insignia of NATO
- ru:Младший лейтенант, Mladshy leytenant
- Midshipman
- Ensign (rank)
- Second lieutenant
- Pilot officer
