= Fähnrichschüler =

- Country: East Germany
- Service branch: Landstreitkräfte; Volksmarine; Luftstreitkräfte; Grenztruppen; Staatssicherheitsdienst
- Formation: c. 1973
- Abolished: 1990
- Next higher rank: Fähnrich

Fähnrichschüler (transl. Ensign student, abbreviated FRS) were German Democratic Republic soldiers who were in training for a career as Fähnrich in the Armed Forces of East Germany. The two-year training was offered in the National People's Army, the Border Troops and in parts of the Ministry for State Security.

== Training ==
The Fähnrich corps was supposed to provide highly specialized "long service members" below the officer level and close a skills gap in the technical careers. While NCOs had the Meisterabschluss Meisterprüfung, the officers completed their training at the East Germany's officers' colleges with a Diploma in engineering, military science, or social sciences. For Fähnrichs of the NVA a specialized technical education was aimed for.

First advanced senior NCOs, usually in the rank of Stabsfeldwebel, were promoted to the rank of Fähnrich, even without them having a specialist technical college qualification. This allowed them to retain specialists who would otherwise have retired after their ten years of service.

Later, only Fähnrichschüler could be appointed Fähnrich if they had successfully completed a two-year training course at a military technical school or an officers' colleges. This training was carried out partly within the branch of the armed forces the person was serving in, for example, for the NVA Air Forces this was carried out at the Military Technical School "Harry Kuhn". During this training, the soldiers wore Fähnrichschüler ranks that corresponded to their service branch.

== Development after 1989/90 ==
After German reunification in October 1990, the remaining Fähnrichschüler and Offiziersschüler students, were taken into the Bundeswehr and kept until they could complete their diplomas. The ranks were removed in 1992 and 1993 respectively.

== Rank insignia ==
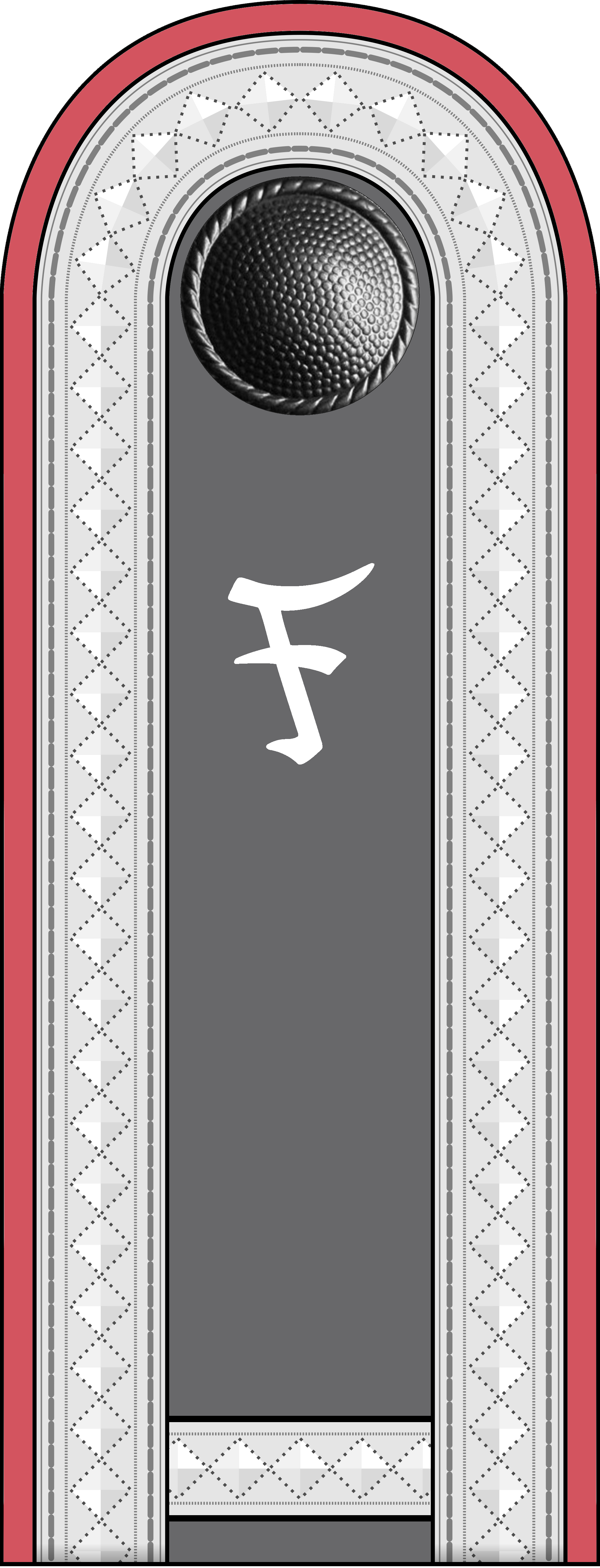
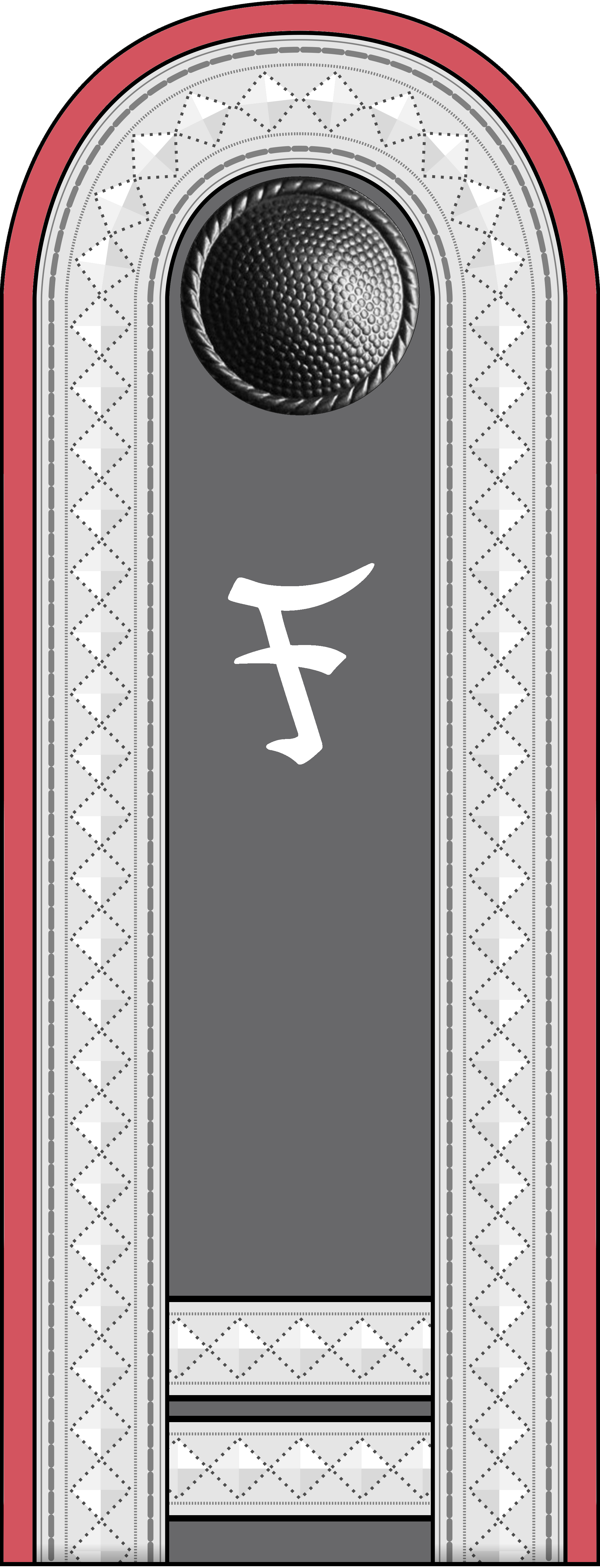
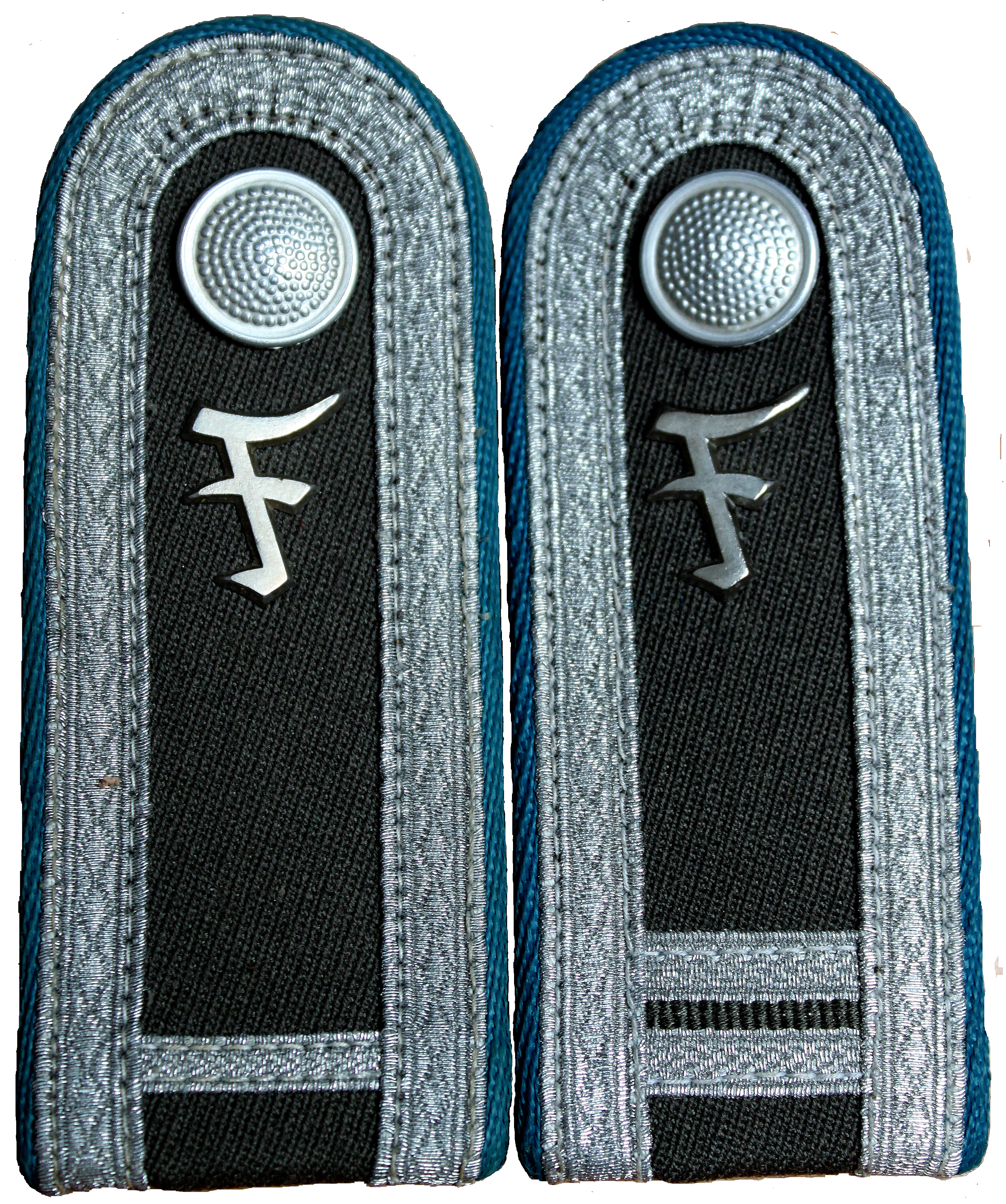
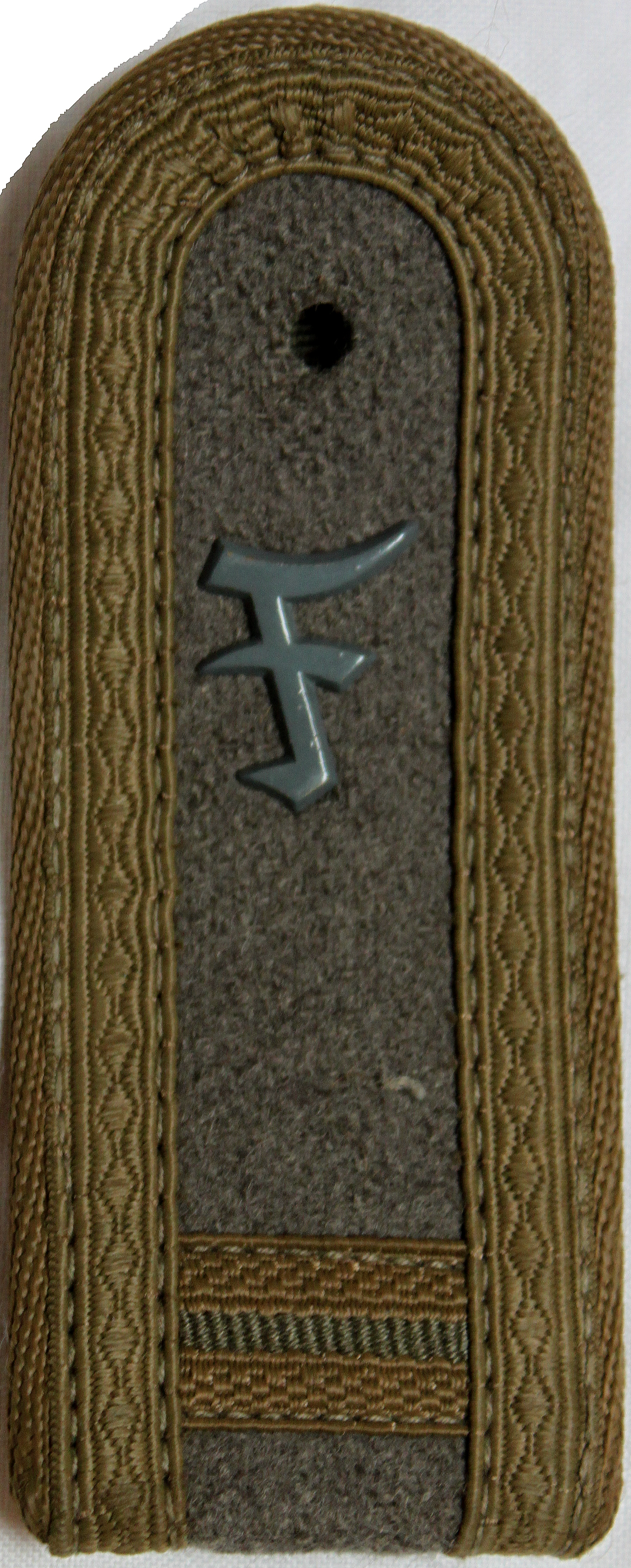
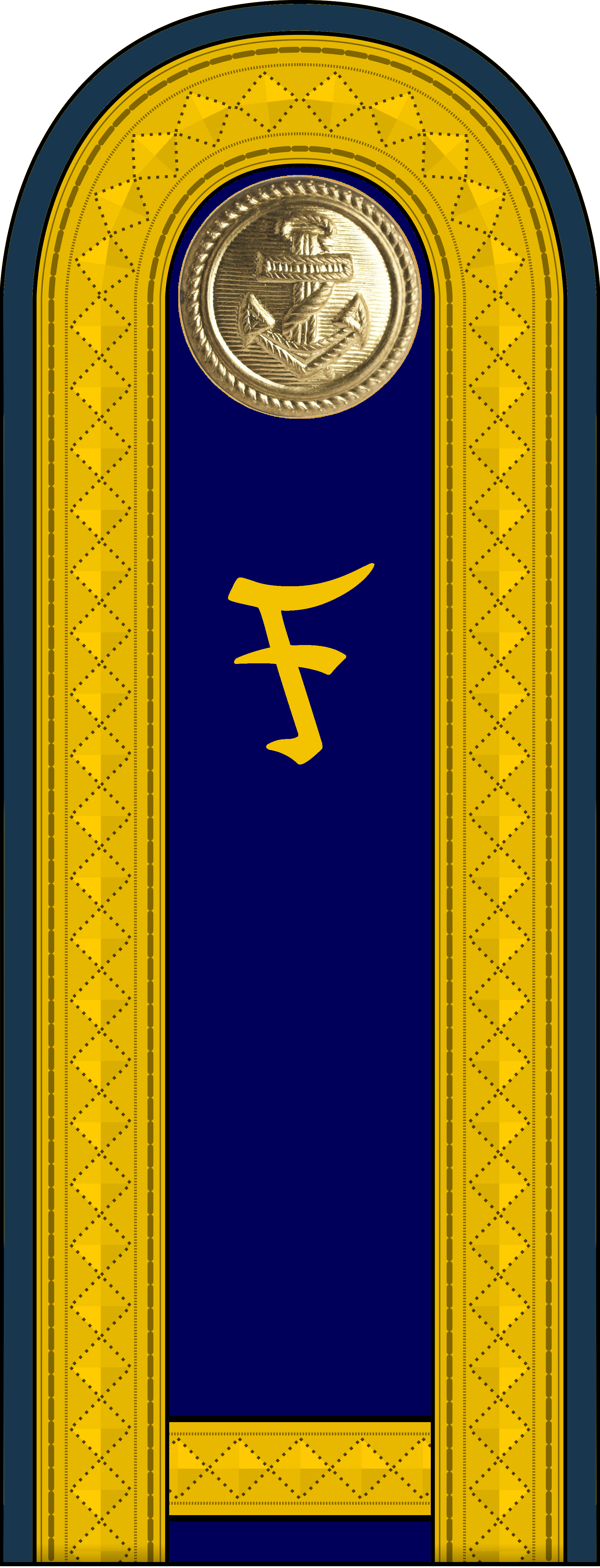
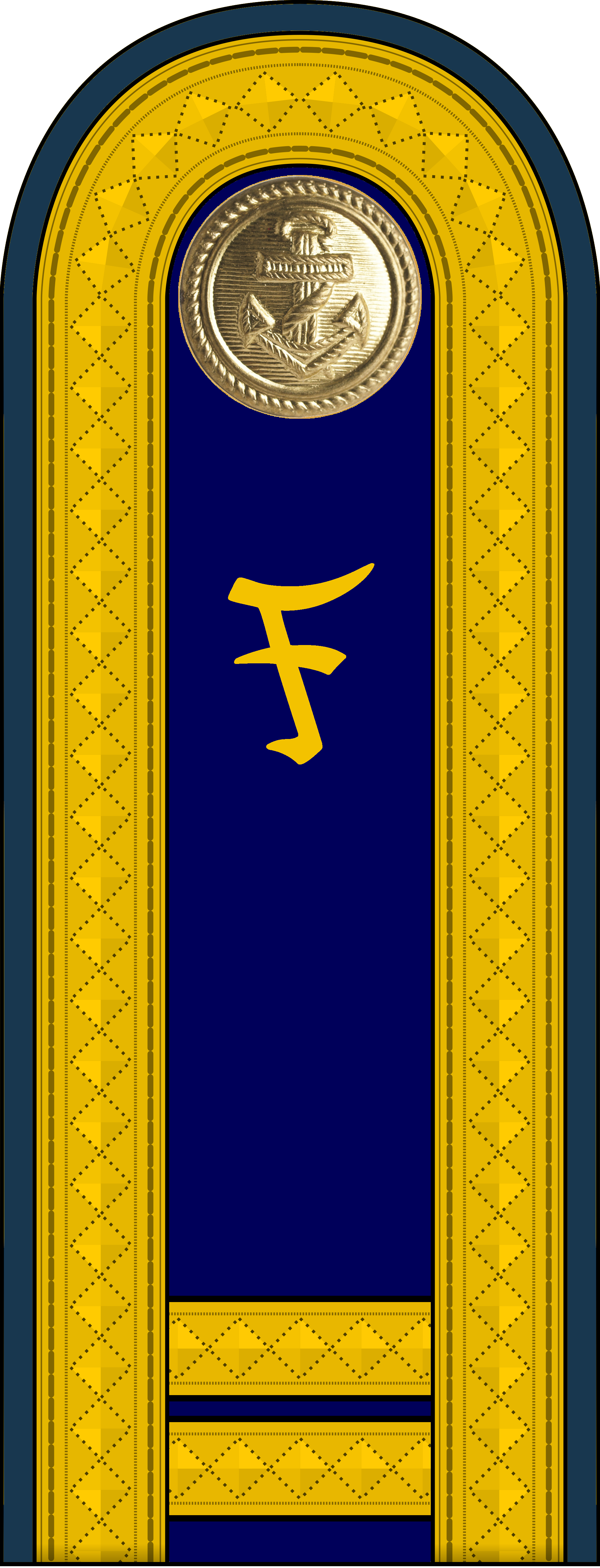
	Air Force, land forces, and border troops				Volksmarine
Colour	Tank troops		Air Force	Field suit	Navy
	1. Studienjahr	2. Studienjahr	1./2. Studienjahr	2. Studienjahr	1. Studienjahr	2. Studienjahr
	1st Year Student	2nd Year Student	1st/2nd Year Student	2nd Year Student	1st Year Student	2nd Year Student

(NPA rank); Fähnrichschüler	senior rank Fähnrich

== See also ==
- Ranks of the National People's Army
- Glossary of German military terms
