= Stabsoberfähnrich (East Germany) =

Stabsoberfähnrich

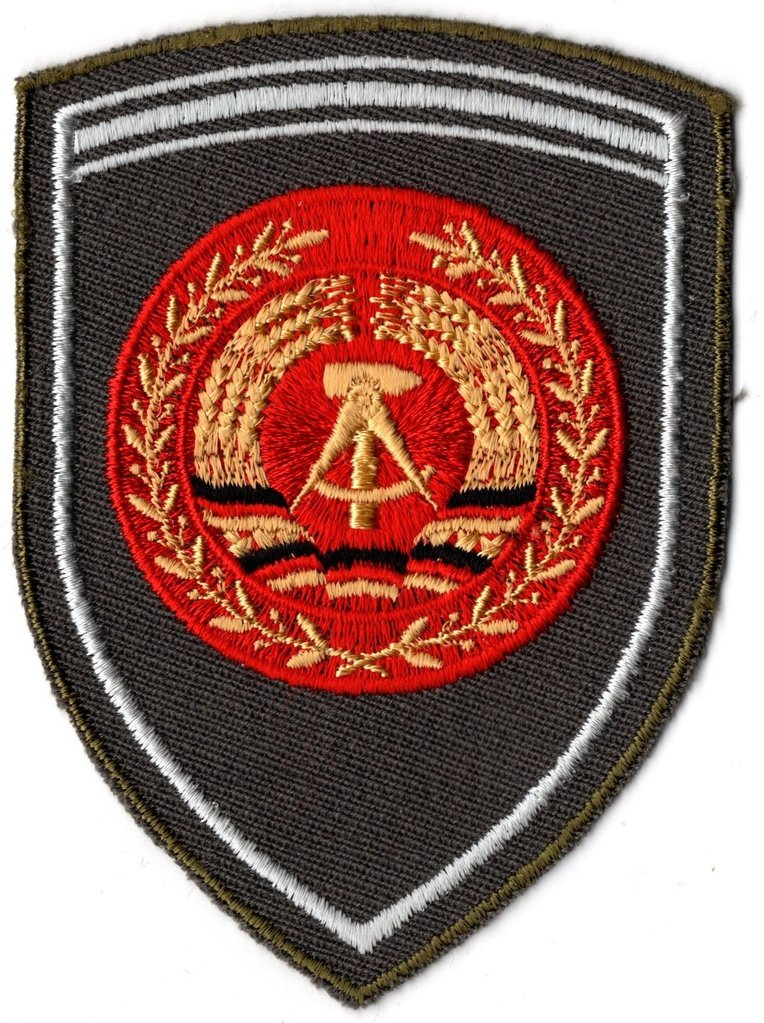

Rank insignia
NPA Fänrich rank
Utilisation
1979-1990
Rank group
Fähnrich
Army, Air Force, Navy
Stabsoberfähnrich
NATO
equivalent
WO-4

Stabsoberfähnrich (short: StOFähnr / in lists: SOFR; en: Staff-senior-fähnrich) was a military rank in the Army of the German Democratic Republic (GDR) from 1979 to 1990. Stabsfähnrich did belong to the autonomous Fähnrich rank group between commissioned officer (CO) and non-commissioned officer (NCO) ranks. The position of the "Fähnrich rank group" might have been compared to the Warrant Officer (WO) rank group in Anglophone armed forces.

The official manner, in line to NPA Handboock, of formal addressing of military people with the rank Stabsoberfähnrich was Genosse/Genossin Stabsoberfähnrich (en: comrade Stabsoberfähnrich).

The bottom up approach in that rank group was as follows:

- Fähnrich WO-1, (en: Fähnrich)
- Oberfähnrich (WO-2), (Senior-fähnrich)
- Stabsfähnrich WO-3, (Staff-fähnrich)
- Stabsoberfähnrich WO-4, (Staff-senior-fähnrich)

⇒ see main article Ranks of the National People's Army

junior rank Stabsfähnrich	(NPA rank); Stabsoberfähnrich	senior rank Unterleutnant

rank insignia Volksmarin

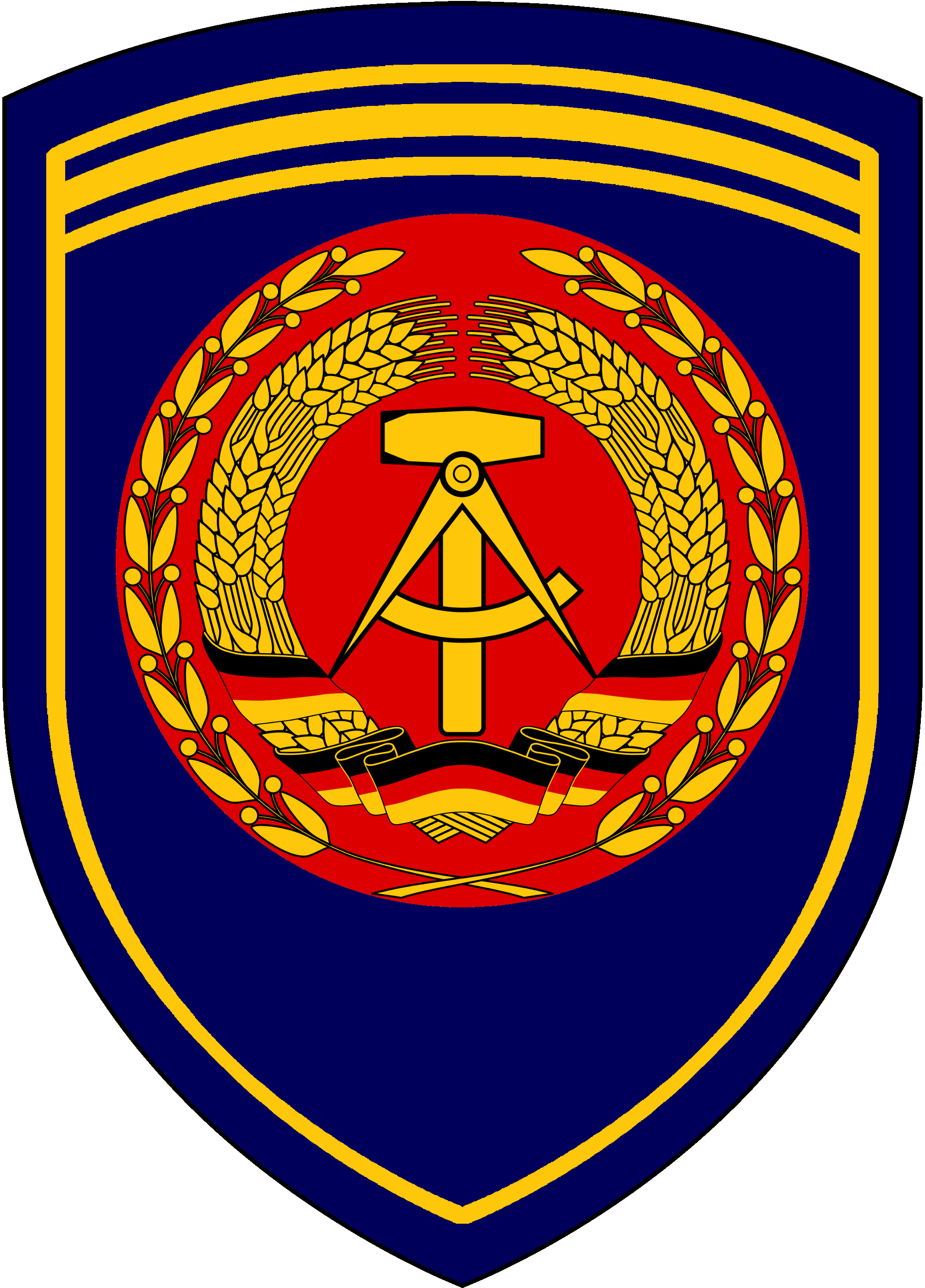
sleeve badge

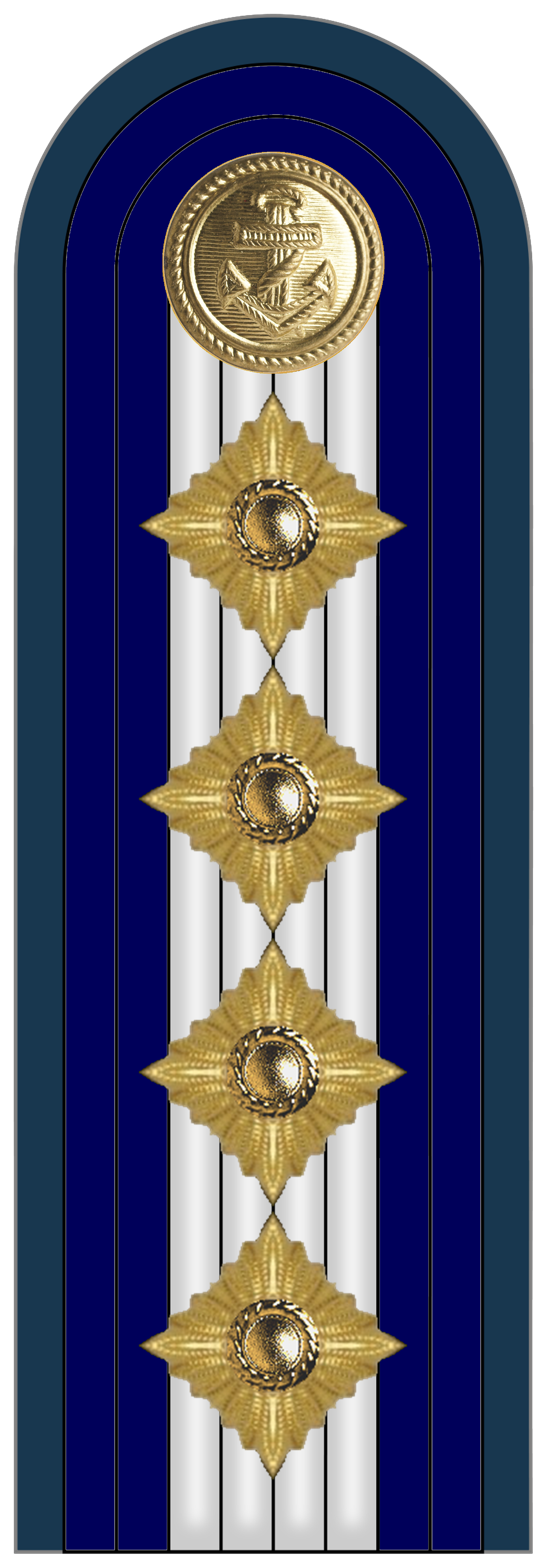
shoulder board

corps colour
(naval blue)
