= Fähnrich (East Germany) =

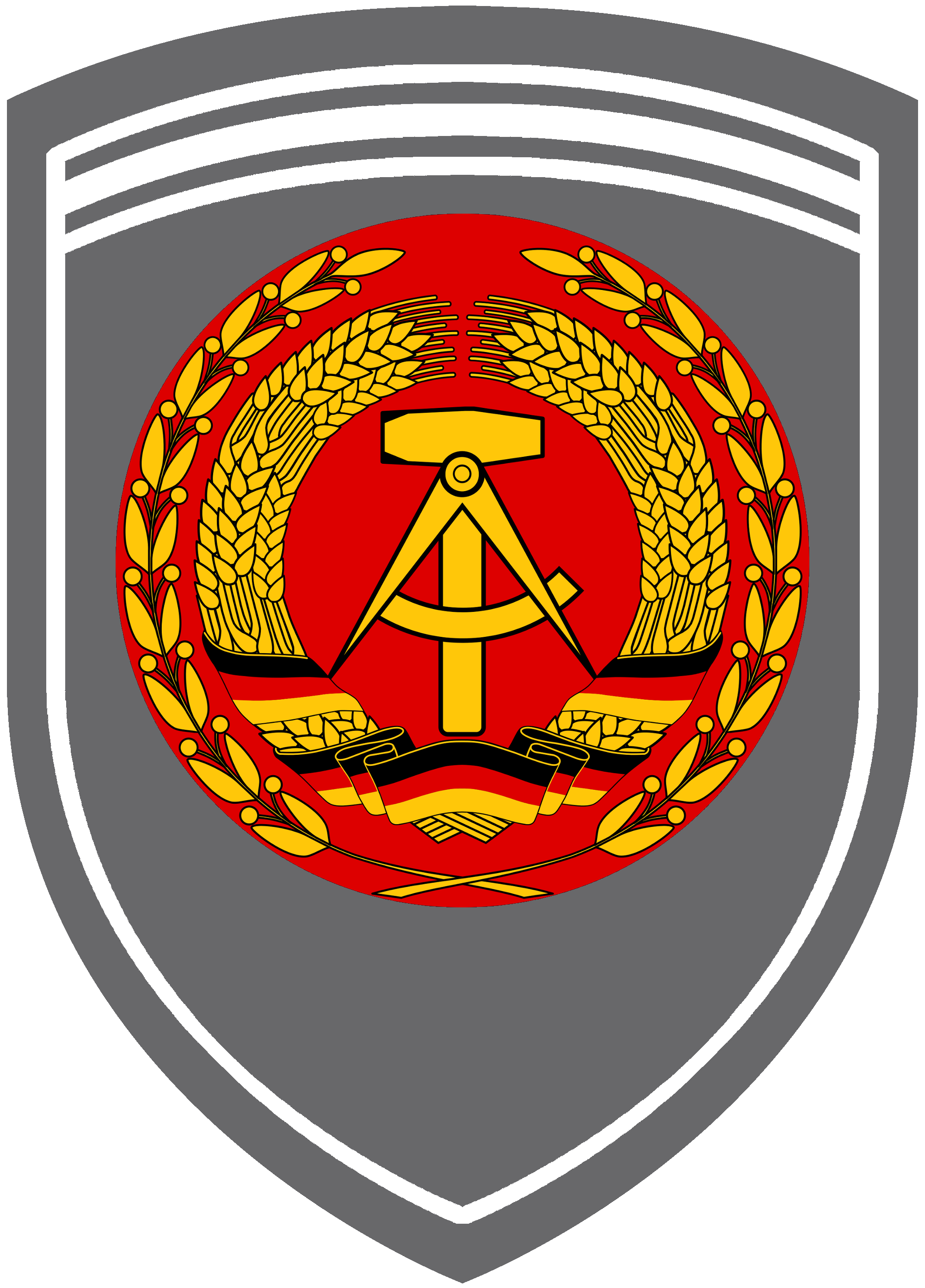
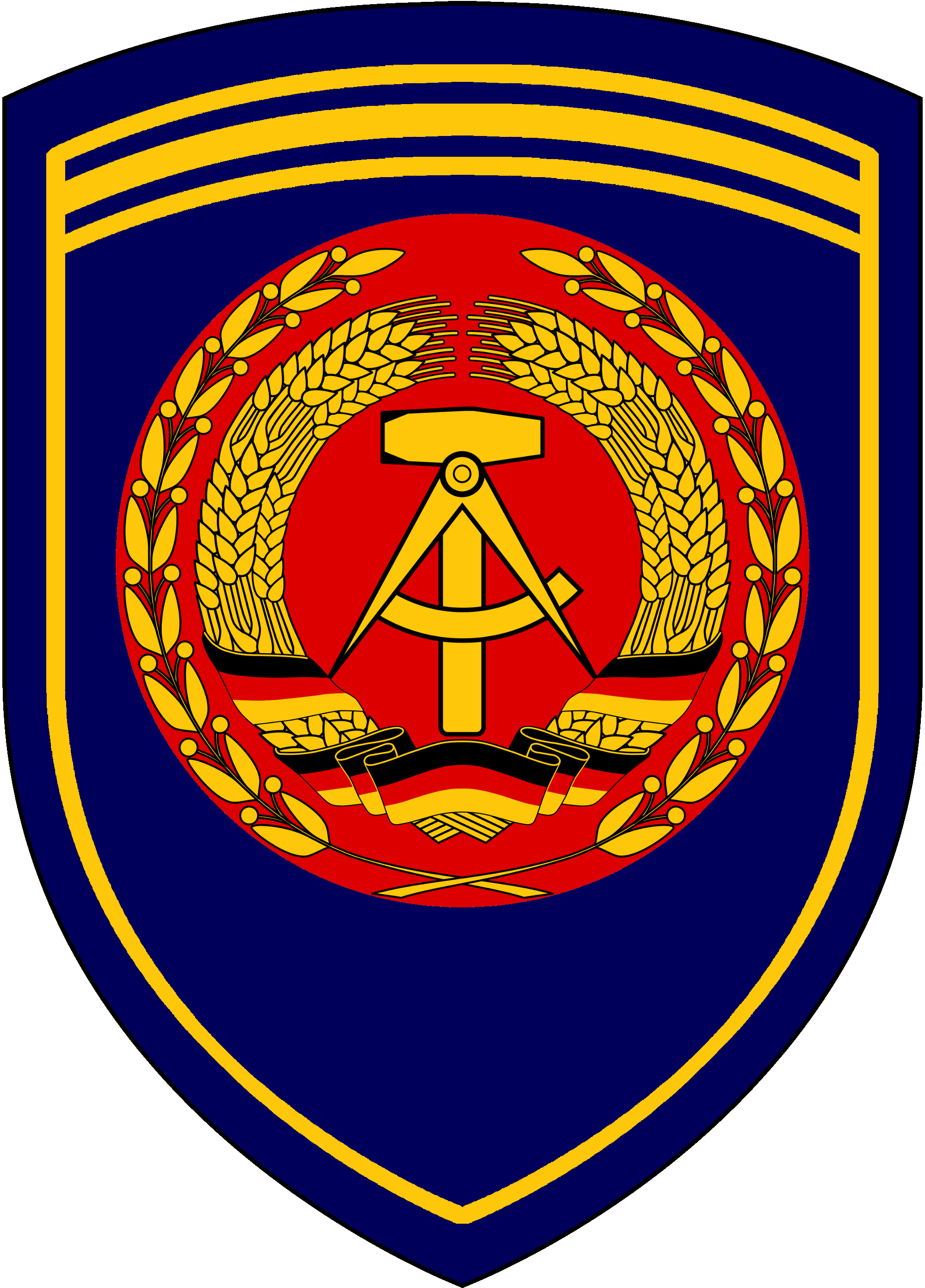
- Sleeve insignias (1979-1990)
- Country: East Germany
- Service branch: National People's Army
- Abbreviation: Fähnr
- Formation: 1973
- Abolished: 1990
- Next higher rank: Oberfähnrich
- Next lower rank: Fähnrichschüler

Fähnrich (short: Fähnr / in lists: FR) was a military rank in the National People's Army (NPA) of the German Democratic Republic (GDR) including the GDR Volksmarine and Border troops, from 1973 to 1990. The minimum service time to this particular type of military specialist was 15 years.

The official manner, in line to NPA Handboock, of formal addressing of military people with the rank Fähnrich was Genosse/Genossin Fähnrich (en: comrade Fähnrich).

== Introduction ==
In line to Minister Order Nr. 168/73, Fähnrich was introduced as new autonomous career group, and rank to the Army, Volksmarine, and the GDR Border troops in 1973. The position of that career group might be compared to the Warrant Officer (WO) rank group in the US-Army. It derives from German Fahne, "flag", and so has means "flag carrier, bannerman."

In 1979 three extra Fähnrich ranks were established (Oberfähnrich, Stabsfähnrich, and Stabsoberfähnrich). With that decision Fähnrich became finally the lowest rank of the Fähnrich rank group, located between commissioned officer (CO) and noncommissioned officer (NCO) ranks.

With that concept the NPA administration followed the Soviet military doctrine, who introduced to the Soviet Army the praporshchik (ru: пра́порщик) rank in 1972, along with the michman (ru: ми́чман; "midshipman") rank in the Soviet Navy. Most other Warsaw Pact countries followed this approach. However, these countries used historical rank designations in order to pursue national military traditions.

Fähnrich ranks were also used in the GDR States security (de: DDR Staatssicherheit - Stasi), and GDR Civil defence (de: Zivilverteidigung der DDR - ZV) as well.

== Training ==
The Fähnrichkorps, was supposed to provide highly specialized "long service members" below the officer level and close a skills gap in the technical careers. While NCOs had the Meisterabschluss Meisterprüfung, the officers completed their training at the Offiziershochschulen der DDR with a Diplom in engineering, military science, or social sciences. For Fähnriche of the NVA a specialized technical education was aimed for.

First advanced senior NCOs, usually in the rank of Stabsfeldwebel, were promoted to the rank of Fähnrich, even without them having a specialist technical college qualification. This allowed them to retain specialists who would otherwise have retired after their ten years of service.

Later, only Fähnrichschüler could be appointed Fähnrich if they had successfully completed a two-year training course at a military technical school or an Offiziershochschulen of the GDR. This training was carried out partly within the branch of the armed forces the person was serving in, for example, for the NVA Air Forces this was carried out at the Militärtechnische Schule der Luftstreitkräfte/Luftverteidigung „Harry Kuhn“. During this training, the soldiers wore Fähnrichschüler ranks that corresponded to their service branch.

== Warsaw Pact countries with similar rank designation ==
On recommendation of the Soviet Union this new rank group was introduced to the so-called brotherly armed forces in most Warsaw Pact countries. However, slight deviations in comparison to the Russian rank designation praporshchik and michman were welcomed, in order to underline national traditions.

- Czechoslovakia ⇒ Praporčík or also Poddůstojník
- Hungary ⇒ Zászlós
- Poland ⇒ Chorąży / Chorąży marynarki
- Romania ⇒ Meistru militar principal (Military master class IV, III, II, I and Senior-military-master)
- Soviet Union ⇒ Прапорщик (Praporshchik) / мичман (michman)

== NPA Fähnrich rank insignia 1979-1990 ==
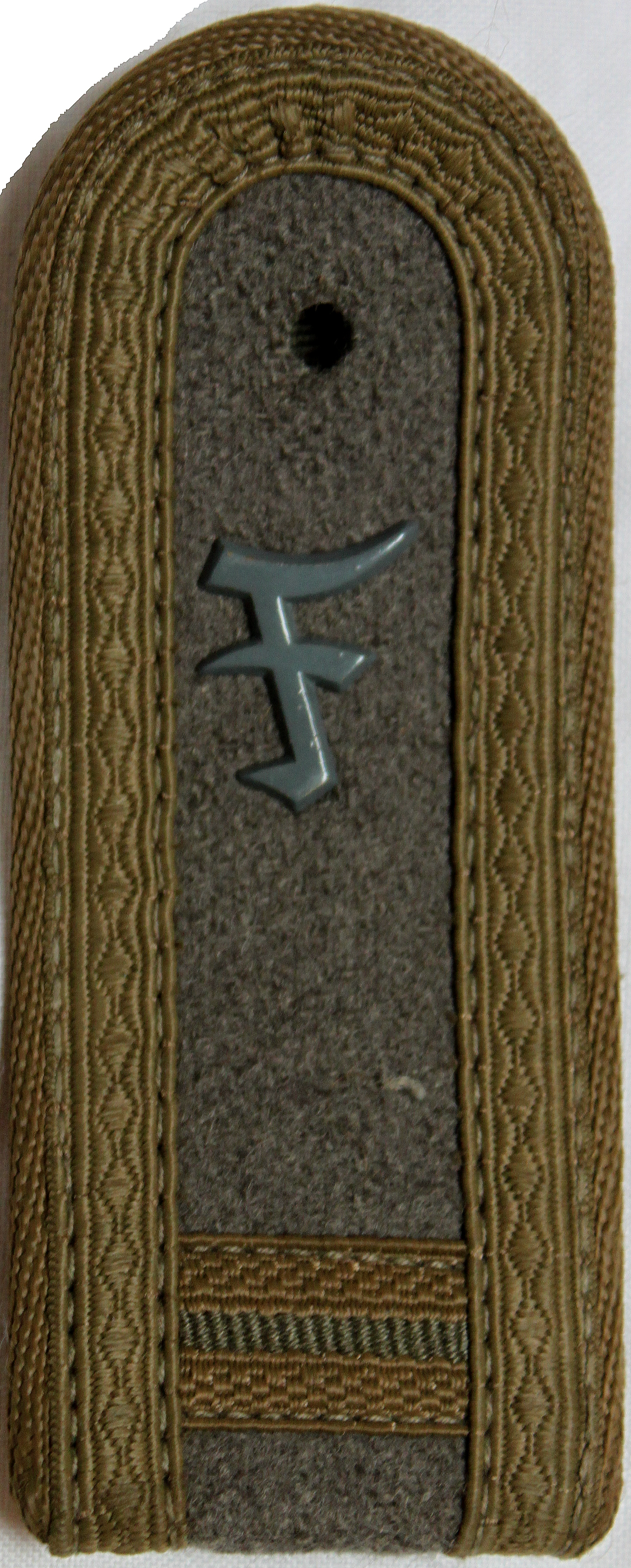
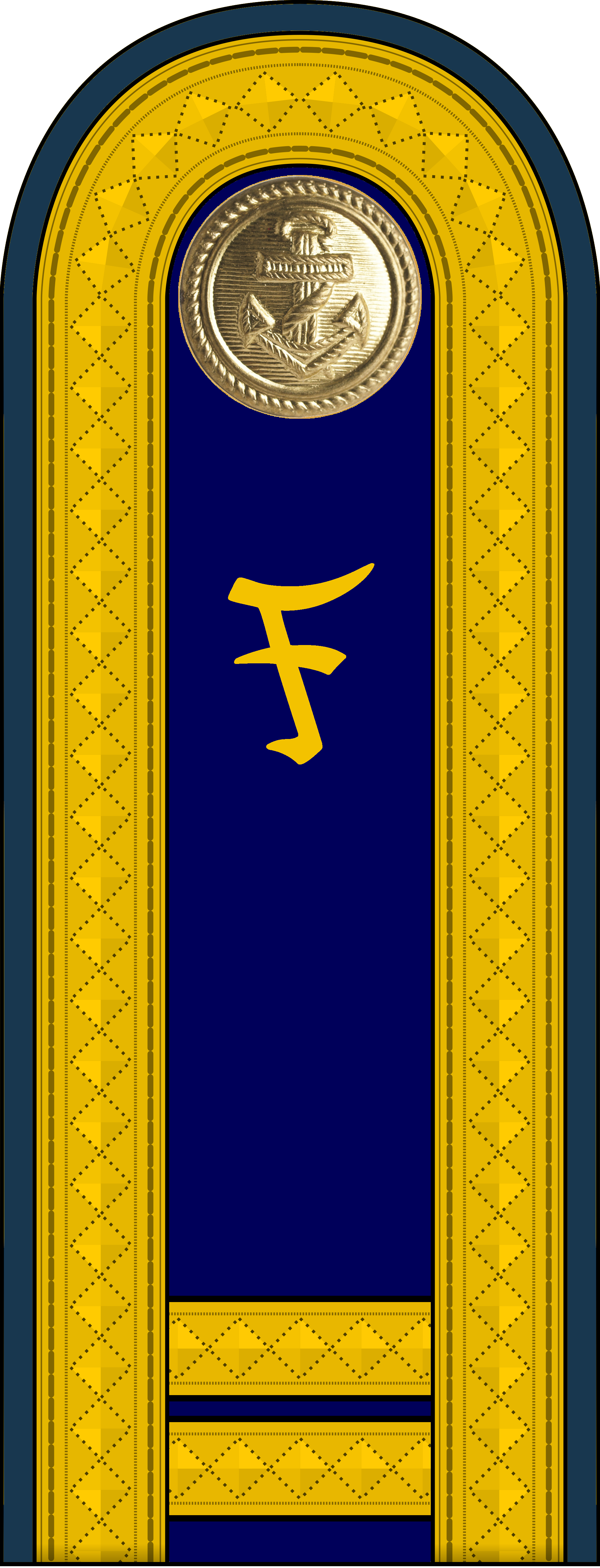
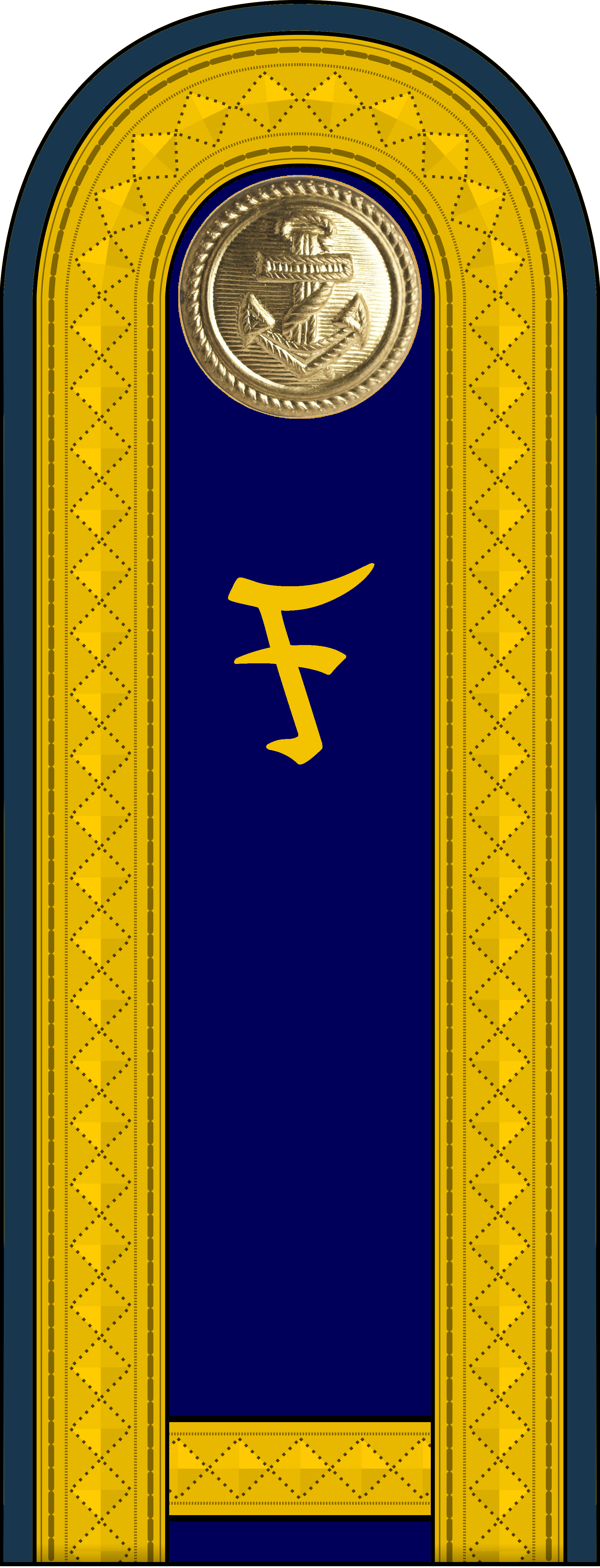
	Air Force, land forces, and border troops					Volksmarine
Colour	Armor	Engineers	Airborne troops	Border troops	Field suit	Naval blue
	Stabsoberfähnrich	Stabsfähnrich	Oberfähnrich	Fähnrich	Fähnrichschüler	Stabsoberfähnrich	Stabsfähnrich	Oberfähnrich	Fähnrich	Fähnrichschüler (Fähnrich-student)
	(Staff-senior-fähnrich)	(Staff-fähnrich)	(Senior-fähnrich)	(Fähnrich)	(Fähnrich-student; 2nd year of studies)	(Staff-senior-fähnrich)	(Staff-fähnrich)	(Senior-fähnrich)	(Fähnrich)	(2nd year of studies)	(1st year of studies)

Sleeve badges «Fähnrich» 1973-1979

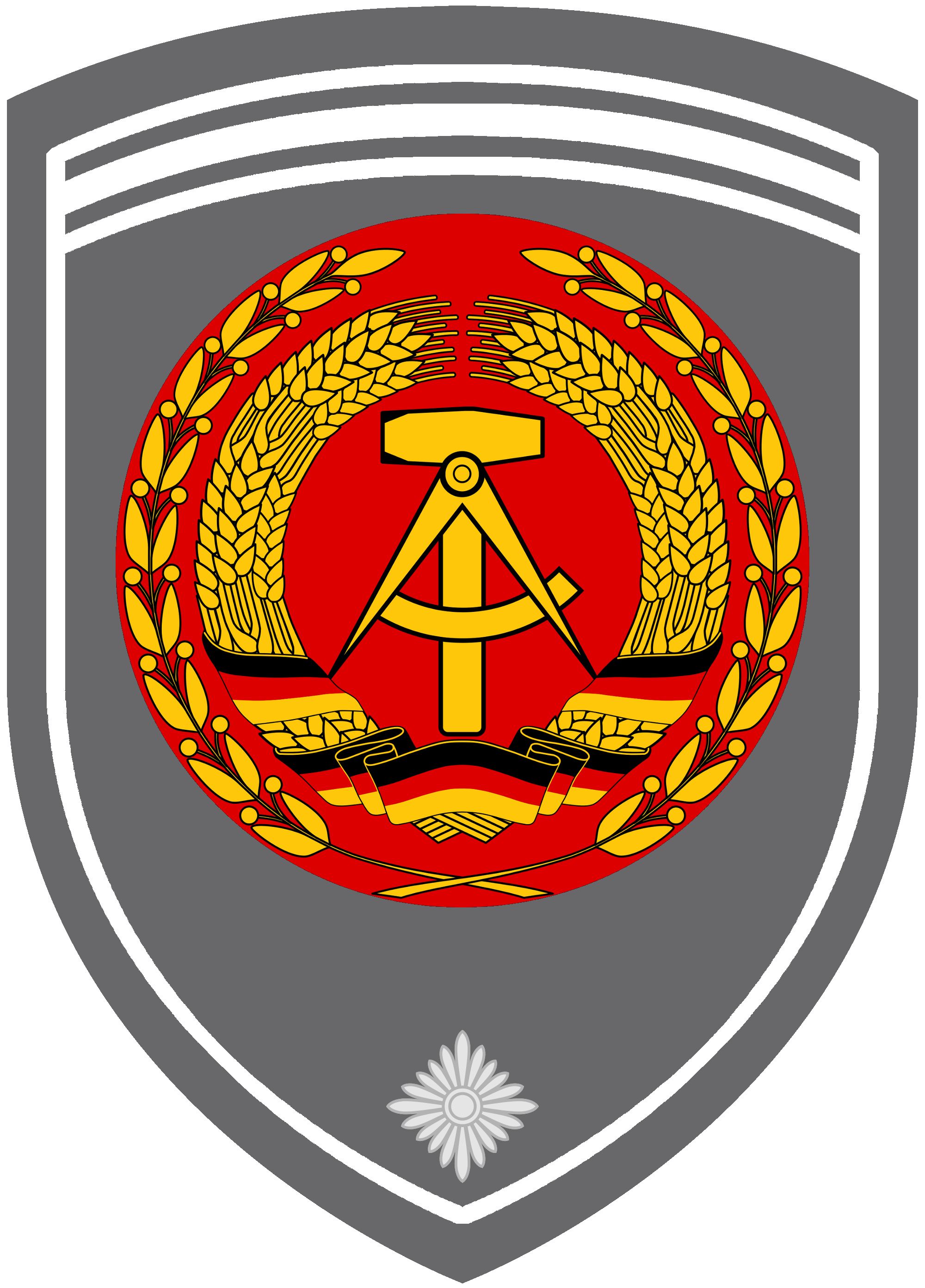
… one star, 10 years of service (Army, Air Force, Border Troops)

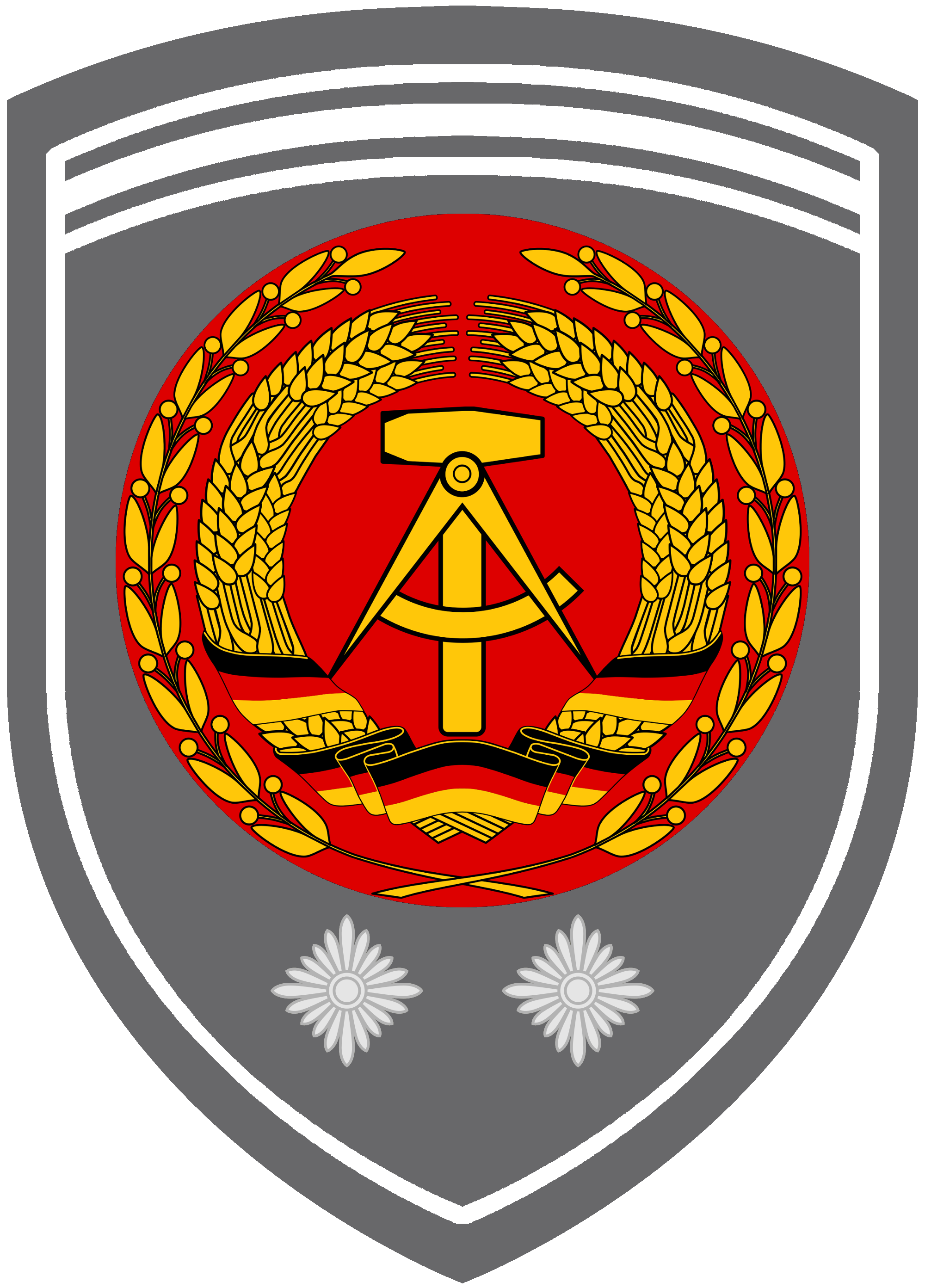
… two stars, 15 years of service (Army, Air Force, Border Troops)

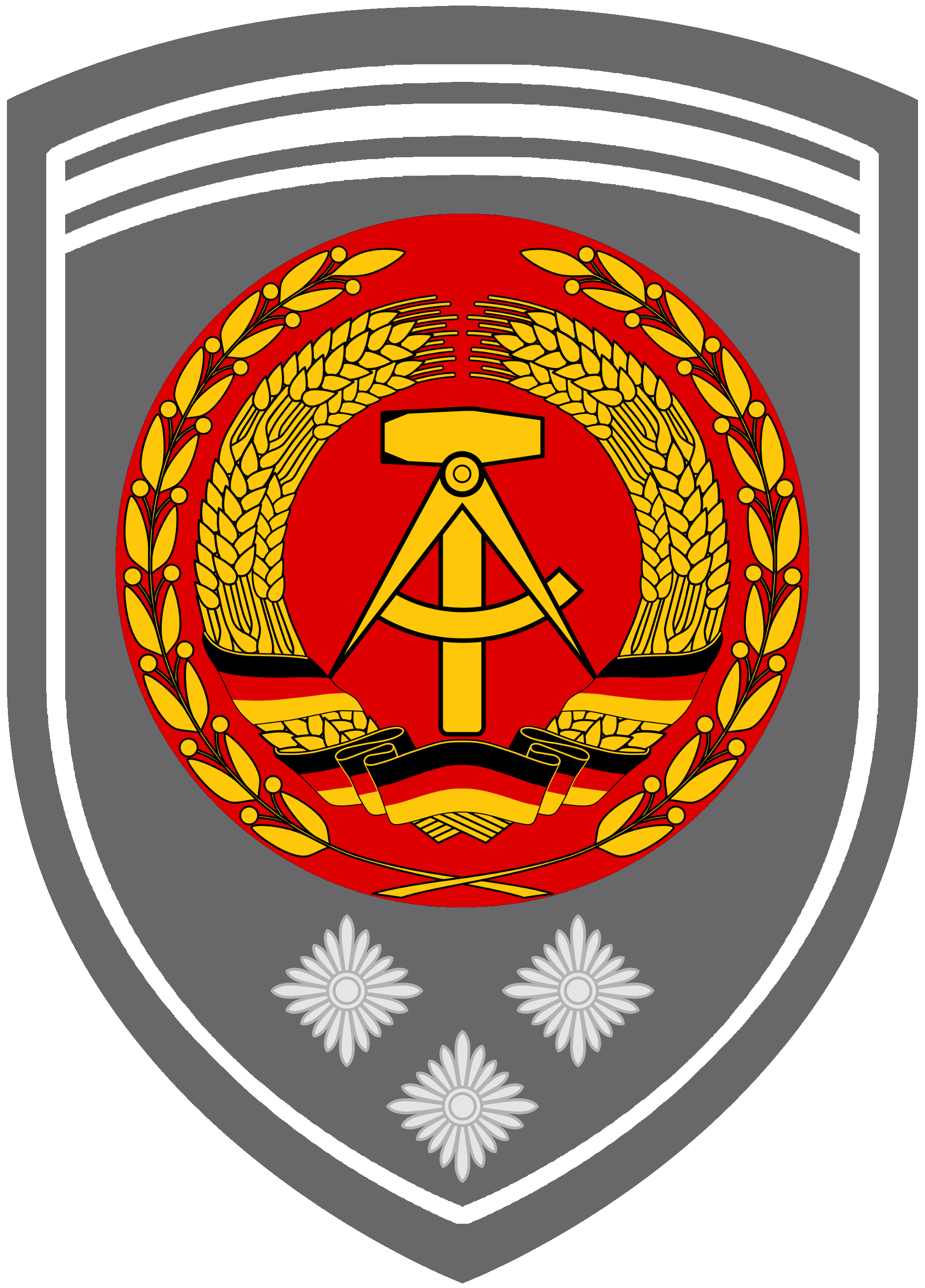
… three stars, 20 years of service (Army, Air Force, Border Troops)

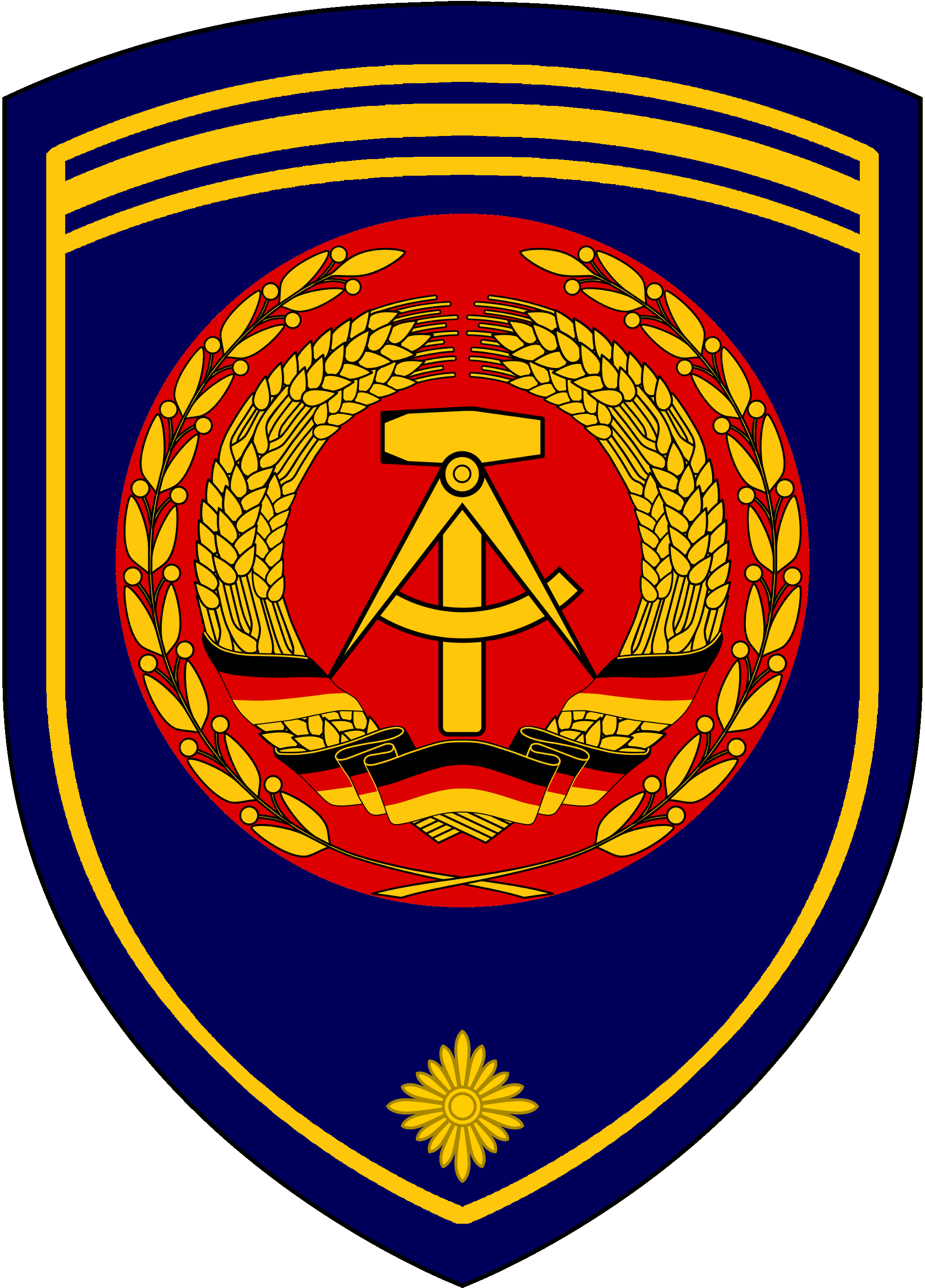
… one star, 10 years of service (Navy)

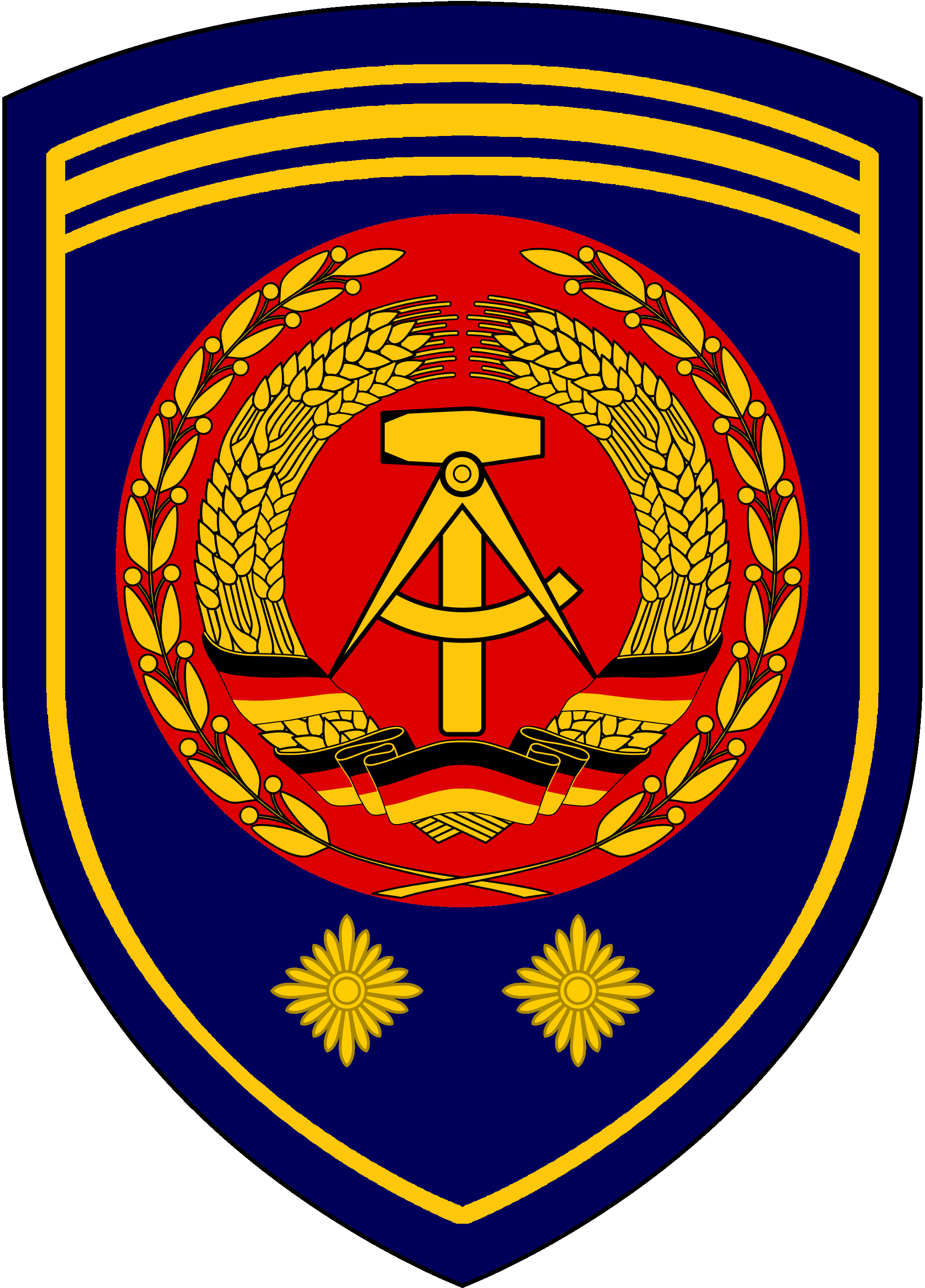
… two stars, 15 years of service (Navy)

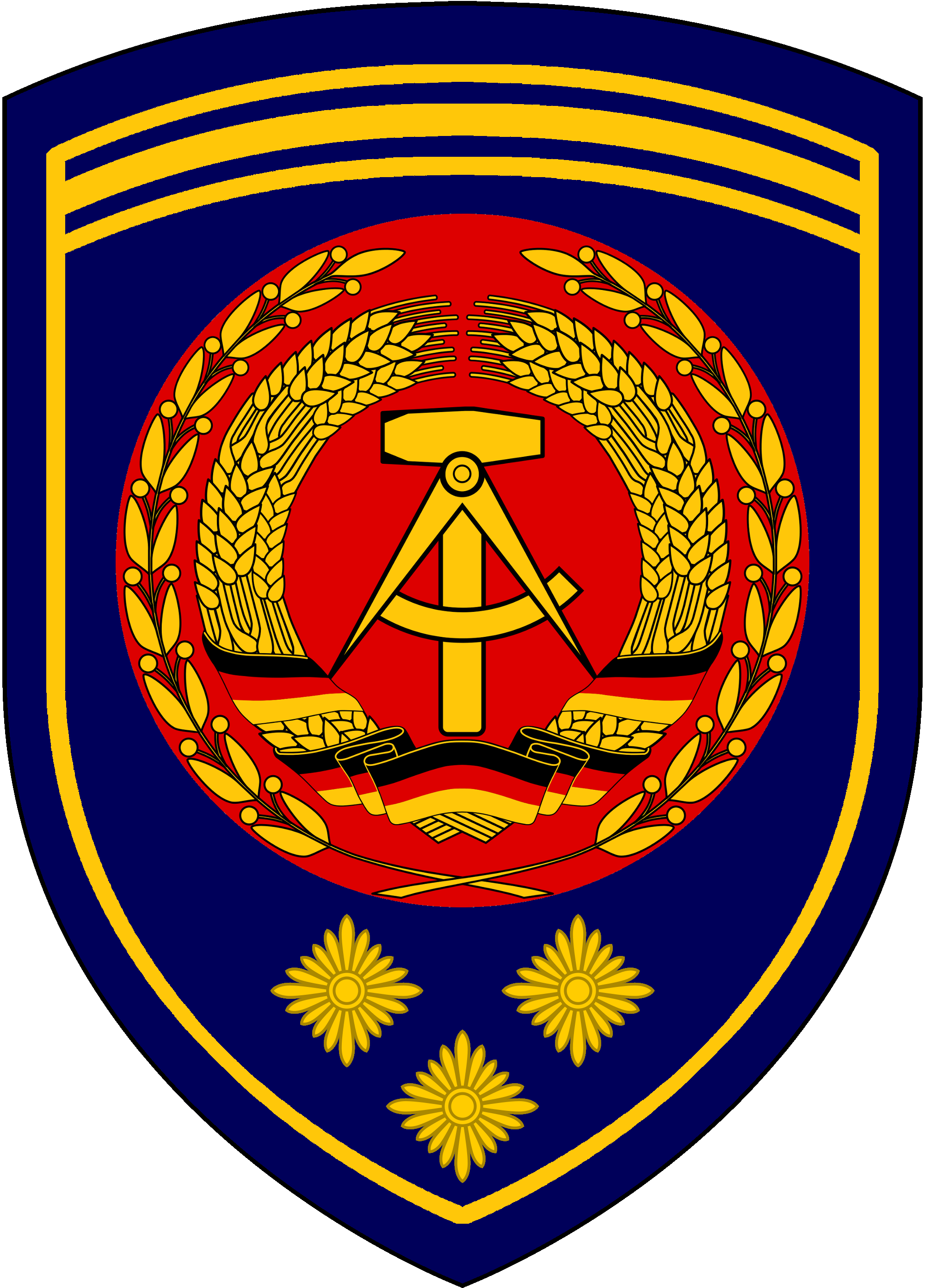
… three stars, 20 years of service (Navy)

⇒ see main article Ranks of the National People's Army ⇒ see main article Corps colours (NPA)

== See also ==
- Ranks of the National People's Army
- Glossary of German military terms
