= Corps colours (NPA) =

Overview article

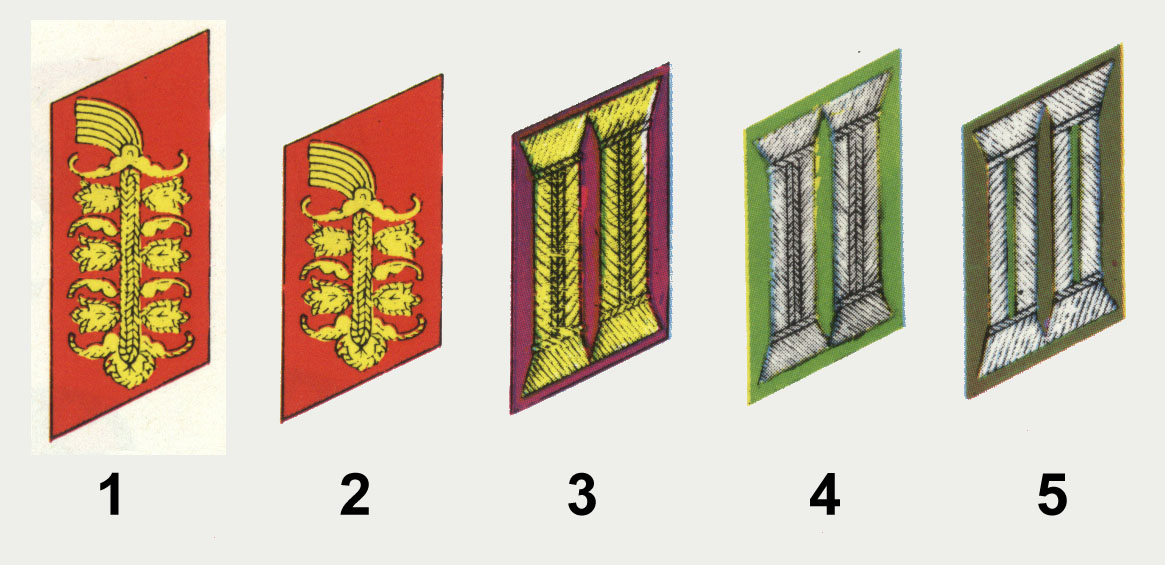

Corps colours, or Troop-function colours, (German: "Waffenfarbe(n)") were worn by the National People's Army of the German Democratic Republic from 1956 to 1990.

== Introduction ==
The GDR NPA uniforms initially bore the corps colours as worn by the Wehrmacht, i.e. as base and filling of the collar and sleeve patches, and as a piping around the shoulder boards/shoulder straps.

Between 1974 and 1976, alongside the introduction of uniforms with open collar and tie, patches of the NPA Landstreitkräfte uniforms were unified across all corps, with a Steingrau base and a white filling, along with white collar piping; the piping of the shoulder boards/shoulder straps remained the only part carrying Waffenfarbe.

However, Air Forces of the National People's Army, paratroopers and generals as well as the Volksmarine continued to wear their specially designed and coloured patches.

The uniform of the Border Troops was distinguished from that of the NVA ground force and Air Force/Air Defence Force by a green armband with large silver letters identifying the wearer's affiliation, and a green cap band.

The tables below contain the corps colours used by the NPA since 1986.)

== Land Forces of the National People's Army ==
Regiment or Battalion type	Colour	Insignias	Rank
General Officers, ground forces	Scarlet (Hochrot)		Colonel general
Motorized Infantry; Reconnaissance	White		Gefreiter
Panzers	Rose-pink (Rosa)		Stabsoberfähnrich
Engineers; Chemical services; Motor vehicle service; Military transport service	Black		Feldwebel
Signals	Yellow		Oberleutnant
Rear service: Medical service; Supply; Legal service; Financial service	Dark green		Colonel Medical service
Military bands	White		Oberstleutnant
Paratroopers	Orange		Oberfaehnrich
Rocket troops & Artillery; Rocket and weapon technical service; Army air defence; Mechanization and automation of command and control	Karmesine (Ziegelrot)		Captain
Construction soldiers	Olive		
Steingrau (also: Feldgrau)	Steingrau		basic colour of the uniform

== Air Forces of the National People's Army ==
Regiment or Battalion type	Colour	Insignias	Rank	Remarks
General officers	Sky blue		Lieutenant general	Also Generals of the Air defense forces and of the Funktechnische Truppen
Air Force			Lieutenant	Officers and warrant officers (Fähnriche)
Air Force			Stabsgefreiter	Rank and file and sergeants
Air Defence Force	Light grey			Including rank and file, sergeants, warrant officers (comp.) and officers

== Border Troops of the German Democratic Republic ==
Border troop ratings	Colour	Insignias	Rank	Remarks
Generale	Green		Major general	Pipings, peaked cap stripe, collar patches, lampasses and stripes in green
Officers, warrant officers (comparable)			Warrant officer of the border troops	Pipings, peaked cap stripe, and stripes in green
Sergeants, rank and file			Unterfeldwebel	Pipings, peaked cap stripe, and stripes in green

== Volksmarine ==
Volksmarine ratings	Colour	Insignias	Rank
Flag officers	Navy blue		Flottenadmiral to Konteradmiral
Officers			Kapitän zur See to Unterleutnant (zur See)
Warrant officers (comparable)			Stabsoberfähnrich to Fähnrich
Petty Officers			Stabsobermeister to Maat
Seamen			Stabsmatrose to Matrose

== Civil defense of the GDR ==
Civil defense of the GDR

- Common (generals, as well): Malino (de:Himbeerrot, meaning the same as and similar in shade to English raspberry)

== Other users ==
Waffenfarben were also worn by the troops of the Stasi, "Ministry for State Security", the Ministry of Internal Affairs with several branches of the police, fire brigades, etc.

== See also ==
- Waffenfarbe
- Glossary of German military terms
