= Uniforms of the German Army (1935–1945) =

German Army uniforms

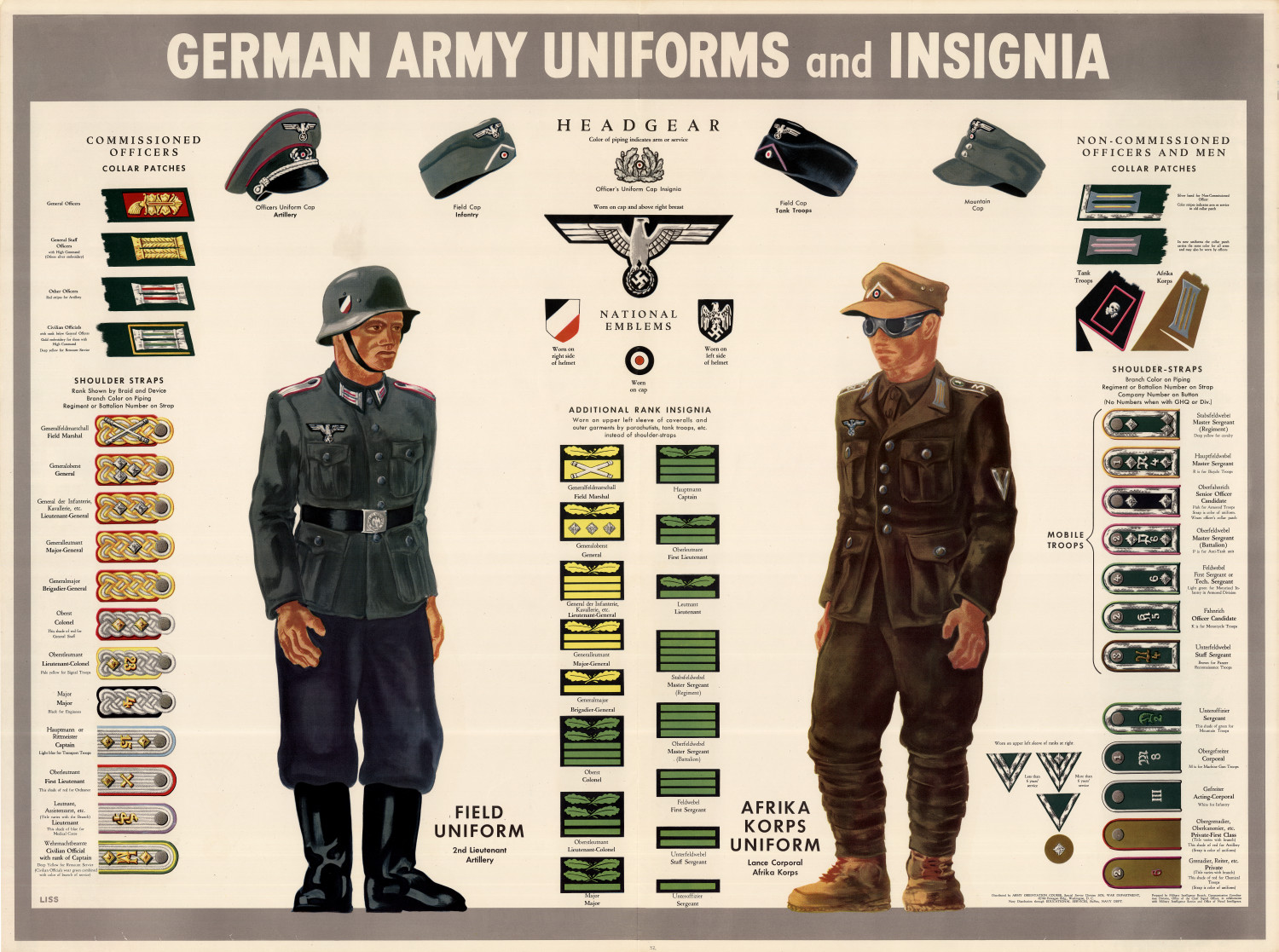
Color poster showing the insignia, patches, hats and uniforms of the German Army. The poster features two figures: one is a German soldier wearing the gray-green wool field uniform and the other is a German soldier wearing the olive cotton tropical (Afrika Korps) uniform. Also depicted are the national emblems worn on headgear.

The following is a general overview of the Heer main uniforms, used by the German Army prior to and during World War II.

Terms such as M40 and M43 were never designated by the Wehrmacht, but are names given to the different versions of the Model 1936 field tunic by modern collectors, to discern between variations, as the M36 was steadily simplified and tweaked due to production time problems and combat experience.

== Insignia ==
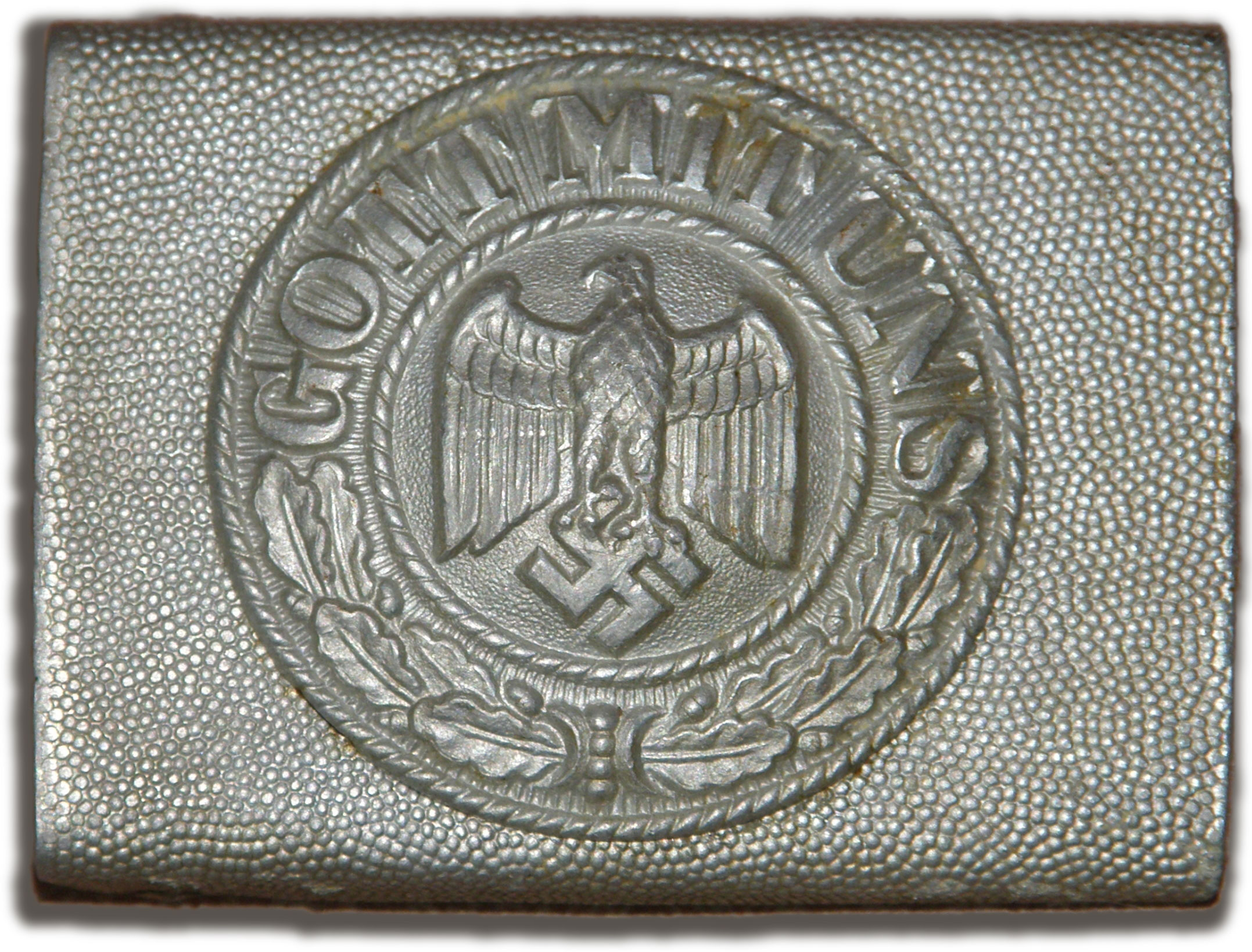
Heer belt-buckle

Uniforms of the Heer as the ground forces of the Wehrmacht were distinguished from other branches by two devices: the army form of the Wehrmachtsadler or Hoheitszeichen (national emblem) worn above the right breast pocket, and – with certain exceptions – collar tabs bearing a pair of Litzen (Doppellitze 'double braid'), a device inherited from the old Prussian Guard which resembled a Roman numeral II on its side. Both eagle and Litzen were machine-embroidered or woven in white or grey (hand-embroidered in silk, silver or aluminium for officers and in gold bullion for generals). Rank was worn on shoulder straps except for junior enlisted (Mannschaften), who wore plain shoulder straps and their rank insignia, if any, on the left upper sleeve. NCO's wore a 9mm silver or grey braid around the collar edge.

Shoulder straps and, in many cases, collar patches were piped or underlaid in Waffenfarbe, a color code which often identified the branch of service to which the unit belonged: white for infantry, red for artillery, rose-pink for Panzer troops and so on.

Most belt buckles had the Heeresadler with the inscription Gott mit uns ('God with us').

== Field and service uniform ==
=== Field Tunic (Feldbluse) ===
==== Model 1936 ====
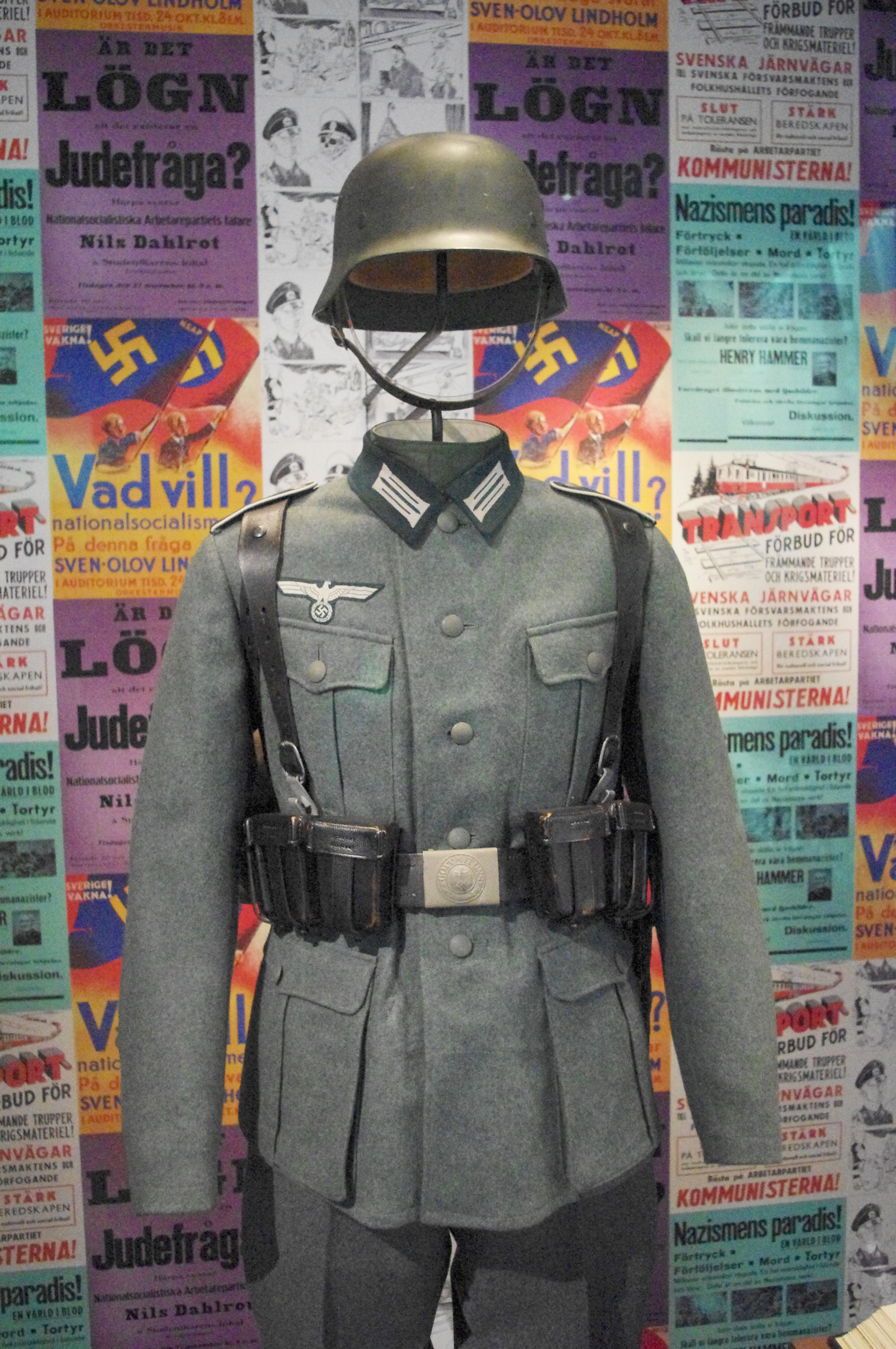
Enlisted infantryman's M36 uniform. Note the dark-green collar and shoulder straps (with white Waffenfarbe), the Litzen collar insignia, and the Wehrmachtsadler above the right breast pocket.

When the Nazis came to power in early 1933 the Reichswehr, the armed forces of the Weimar Republic, were near the end of a two-year project to redesign the Army Feldbluse ('field blouse'). Beginning in that year the new tunic was issued to the Reichsheer and then the rapidly growing Wehrmacht Heer, although minor design changes continued to be made until the appearance of the standardized Heeres Dienstanzug Modell 1936. The M36 tunic still retained the traditional Imperial and Reichswehr uniform color of grey-green "field gray" (feldgrau) (Note: Because of the large number of suppliers and then wartime shortages, "field gray" in practice covered a wide range of shades. In general, earlier uniforms were greener, with later ones tending toward grey and then brown, but there were at all times many variations) wool, but incorporated four front patch pockets with scalloped flaps and pleats (on Reichswehr tunics the lower pockets were internal and angled). The front was closed with five buttons rather than the previous eight, and the collar and shoulder straps were of a dark bottle-green instead of the Reichswehr grey. Compared to the Weimar-era uniforms the skirt of the feldbluse was shorter and the tailoring was more form-fitting due to Germany's adoption of mechanized warfare: soldiers now spent much time in the confined space of a vehicle and a shorter jacket was less likely to pick up dirt from the seats. It also included an internal suspension system, whereby a soldier could hang an equipment belt on a series of hooks outside of the tunic. These hooks were connected to two straps inside the lining, which spread the weight of the equipment without having to use external equipment suspenders. The M36 was produced and issued until the very end of the war, though successive patterns became predominant.

SS field uniforms were of similar appearance externally but to fit their larger patches had a wider, feldgrau collar, and the lower pockets were of an angled slash type similar to the black or grey SS service-dress. The second button of an SS Feldbluse was positioned somewhat lower, so that it could be worn open-collar with a necktie. Due to supply problems, the SS were often issued army uniforms.

==== M40 Tunic ====
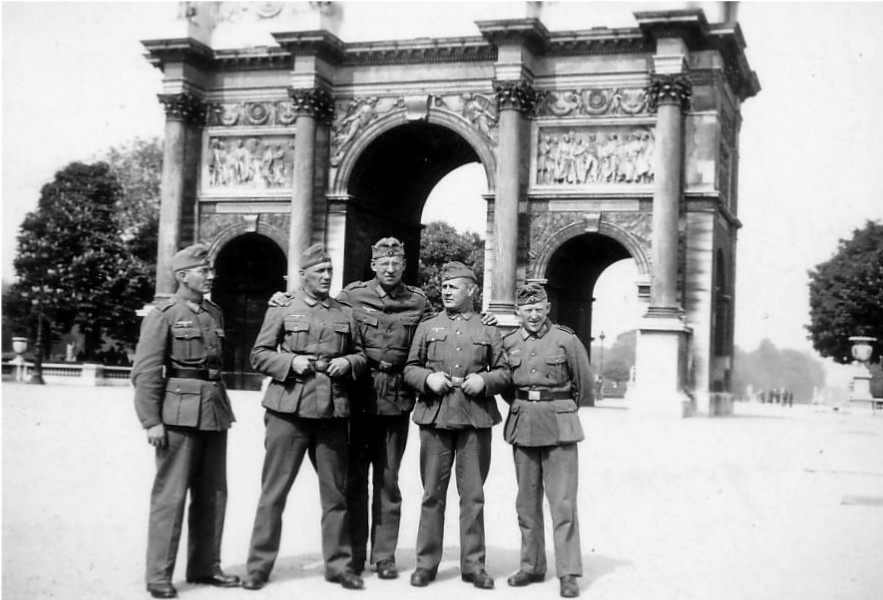
Germans in Paris, 1940

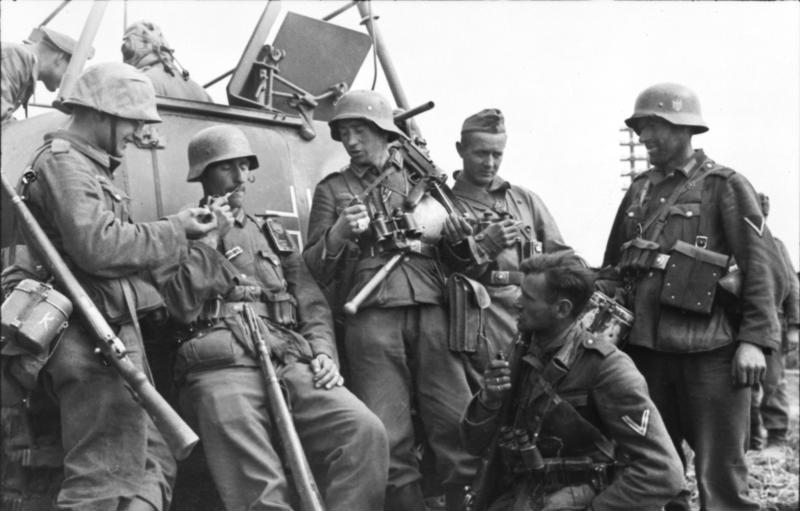
German soldiers with Stahlhelm in the Soviet Union in 1942

The M40 uniform was the first design change in the standard army uniform. It differed from the M36 only in the substitution of feldgrau for the bottle green collar and shoulder straps, which began to be phased out in 1938/39, though most combat examples show this variation appearing in 1940, hence the unofficial M40 pattern. The troops liked the older green collars, and M40 (and later) tunics modified with salvaged M36 collars or bottle-green collar overlays are not uncommon.

==== M41 Tunic ====
The M41 is exactly the same as the M40, but with a 6 button front due to the decline of material quality, which by now was 50% or more viscose rayon and recycled shoddy. SS-specific uniforms nonetheless stayed with 5 buttons.

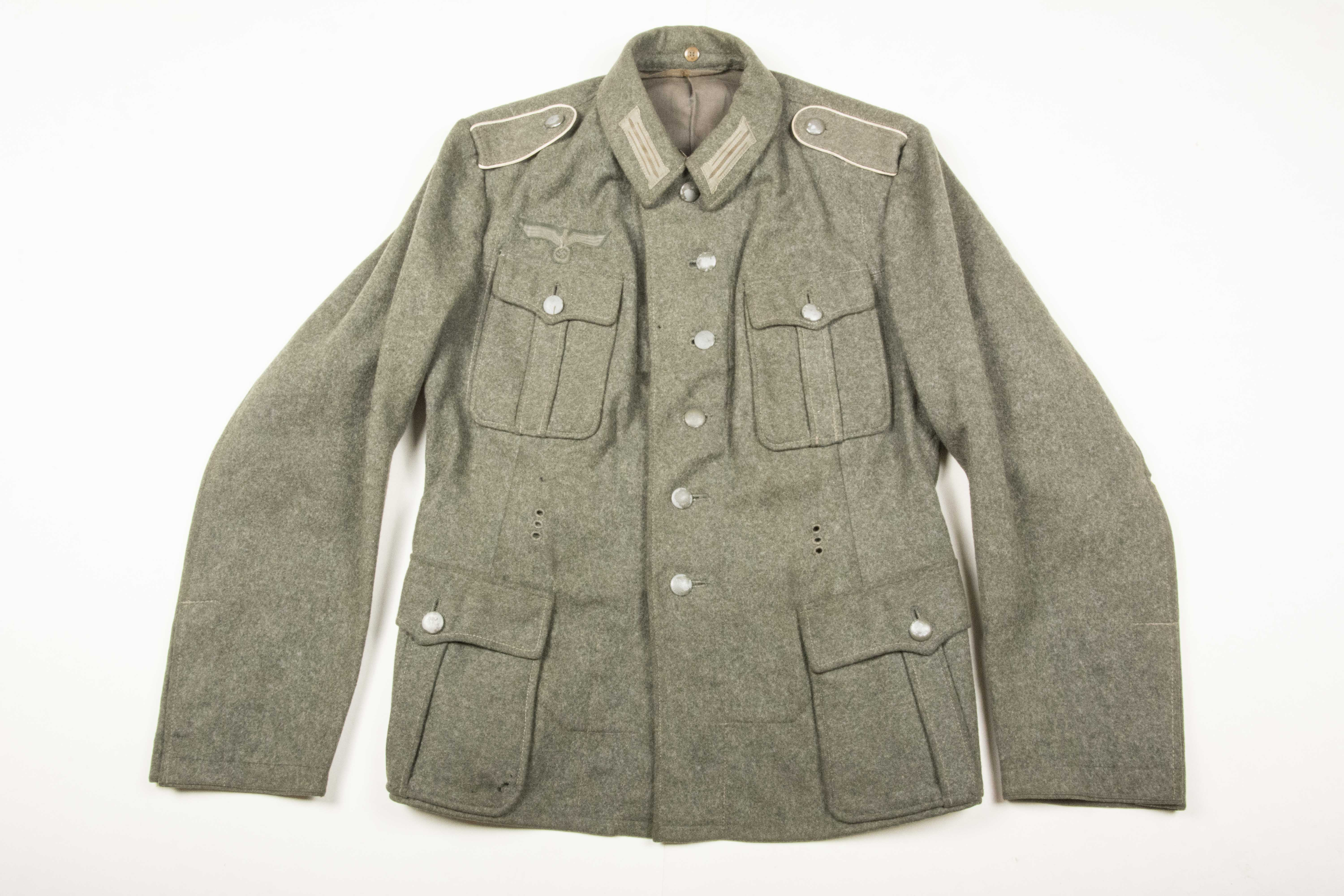
M41 Heer tunic

==== M42 Tunic ====
The M42 is essentially an M40/41 tunic, but with pleats removed from all the pockets to save on materials and production time.

==== M43 Tunic ====
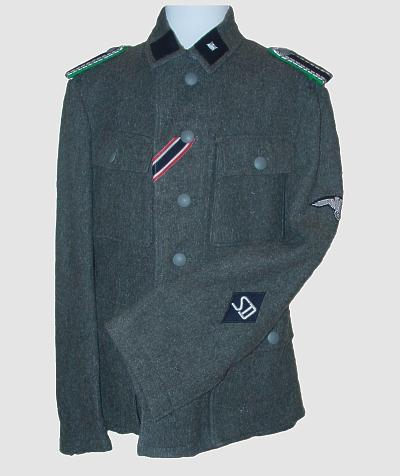
M43 uniform with SD Sicherheitsdienst insignia

The M43 saw the removal of all pleats and scalloped flaps from the field tunic, and pockets began to be cut straight rather than with rounded edges. Many M43 tunics were made with a much simplified version of the internal suspension system, or omitted it entirely.

==== Field Blouse Model 1944 ====
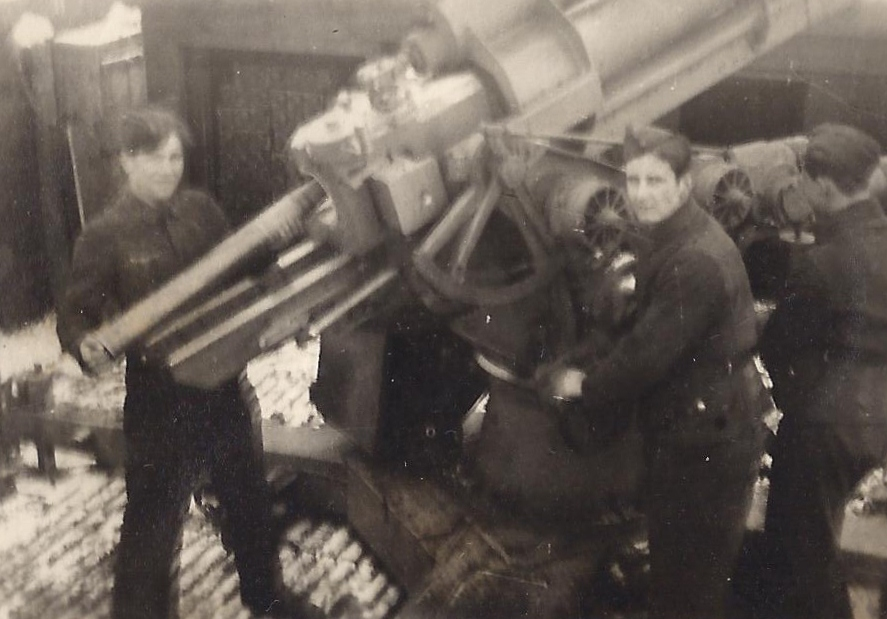
Flakhelfer anti-aircraft gun crew in 1944 pattern uniform

In late 1944, in order to cut down on tailoring and production costs, the Wehrmacht introduced the M44 pattern uniform. Similar in appearance to the British Battledress or the related US "Ike" jacket, the M44 was unlike any other German pattern uniform, and the first major deviation in uniform design since 1936. The tunic skirt was shortened to waist length, an internal belt was added, and the tunic could be worn with an open or closed collar. The color was the new Feldgrau 44, a drab greenish-brown. The rarely used and complicated internal suspension system was finally dropped. German insignia was still worn (breast eagle, collar Litzen and shoulder boards). Except for the elite Panzer-Lehr-Division, which field-tested the new uniform in summer 1944 before its approval for general issue, the M44 was usually seen at the front only in the war's last months and generally on the greenest of troops: new replacements, teenage Flakhelfer, and Hitlerjugend and Volkssturm militia.

=== Greatcoat ===
==== M36 ====
Field grey double-breasted great coat with dark green collar and shoulder strap. It was worn by all ranks below general officers. Generals and field marshals wore a variant with scarlet (hochrot) turnback lapels and gold buttons.

=== Trousers ===
==== M22 (M36) ====
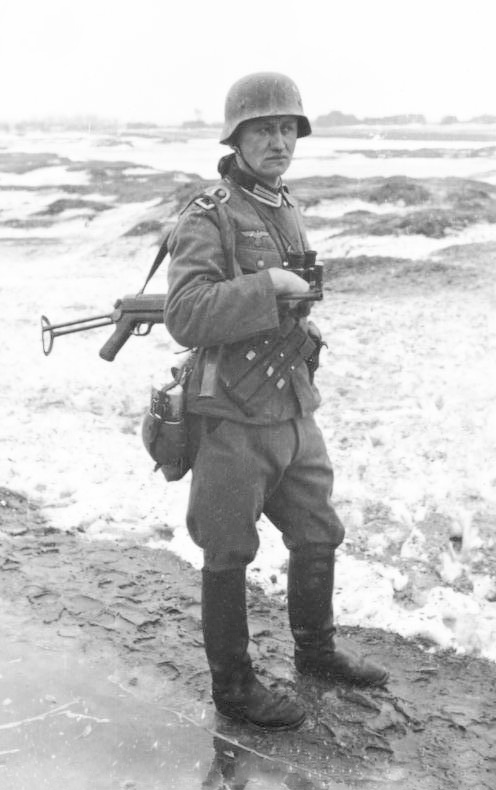
Wehrmacht NCO with M22 trousers, tall prewar boots and 1941 pattern uniform modified with green collar.

Originally the M1936 tunic was worn with the same stone gray (steingrau) trousers that the Reichswehr had introduced in 1922. These were high-waisted, straight legged, button-fly trousers with suspenders (braces) and three internal pockets plus a watch-pocket; in the field they were worn tucked into jackboots.

==== M40 ====
In 1940 contractors were ordered to discontinue the manufacture of steingrau fabric and instead produce trousers from the same feldgrau cloth as the tunic; however, Army depots continued to issue existing stocks and the older dark trousers were still frequently seen until around 1942.

==== M42 ====
A new design of field trousers was introduced in 1942, replacing the old World War I style straight legged Langhosen. These were based on the gebirgsjäger model of trousers, designed to be worn with low boots and gaiters, which began replacing jackboots in 1941. New features included tapered ankles, reinforced seat, and a straight-cut waist, which included belt loops and two tabs for optional suspender use, as opposed to the fishtail design of the M36 model. HBT models often were straight legged, and featured a tab and buttons to taper the ankles, for optional use without gaiters.

==== M43 ====
In the late war, lower quality, often recycled material was being used for uniforms. The M43 trousers saw extra fly buttons being added to accommodate a reinforced waistband, all other features remained virtually the same.

=== Field caps ===
==== Side cap (Feldmütze) M34/M38/M42 ====
The original soft headdress for the Heer, introduced in 1934, was a folding garrison or envelope cap in feldgrau wool, similar to that worn by American, Soviet and RAF personnel but with a "scoop" in the front; the Schiffchen ('little ship') was popular, convenient, and worn throughout the war. Variants in black wool and olive cotton were issued with the Panzer and tropical uniforms. Insignia consisted of an embroidered national emblem (Wehrmachtsadler) and red-white-black cockade, and (until 1942) an inverted chevron (soutache) in Waffenfarbe. Officers' caps (M38) were piped in silver or aluminum (gold for generals). A variant appeared in 1942 with a two-part "fold" intended to serve as ear flaps in cold weather, secured by two front buttons: this was rapidly overtaken by the M43 field cap.

==== Visored field cap (Einheitsfeldmütze) M43 ====
M43 field cap (SS insignia)

Since before World War I German and Austrian mountain troops had worn a visored "ski cap" (Gebirgsmütze) with turn-down ear flaps secured in front by two buttons. A version of this cap with longer visor, false turn-down, and slightly lower crown in olive cotton twill had been issued with the tropical uniform. In 1943 a similar cap in field-grey wool with a visor intermediate in length between the mountain and tropical versions was issued to all troops for field wear only; it quickly became the most commonly seen soft headgear at the front. Insignia was similar to that of the side-cap, although the eagle and cockade were both worn above the turn-up. A black version was issued to Panzer crewmen.

==== Peaked cap (Schirmmütze) ====
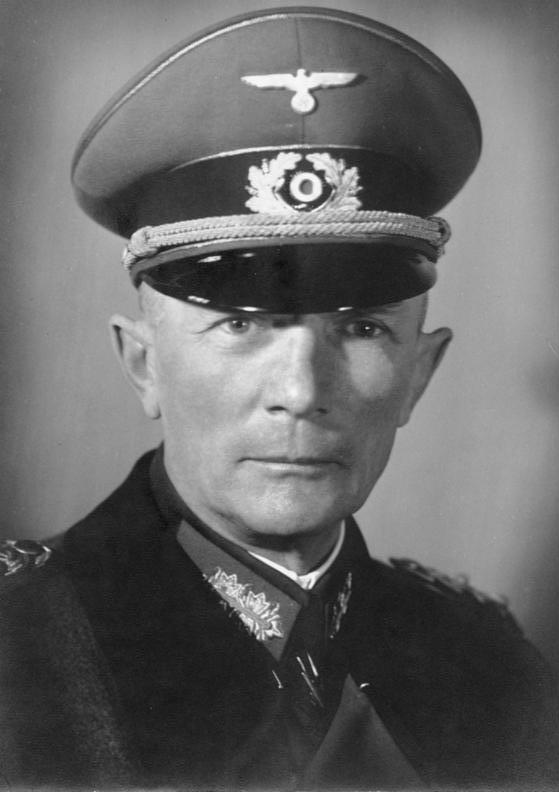
Field Marshal Fedor von Bock wearing the Schirmmütze

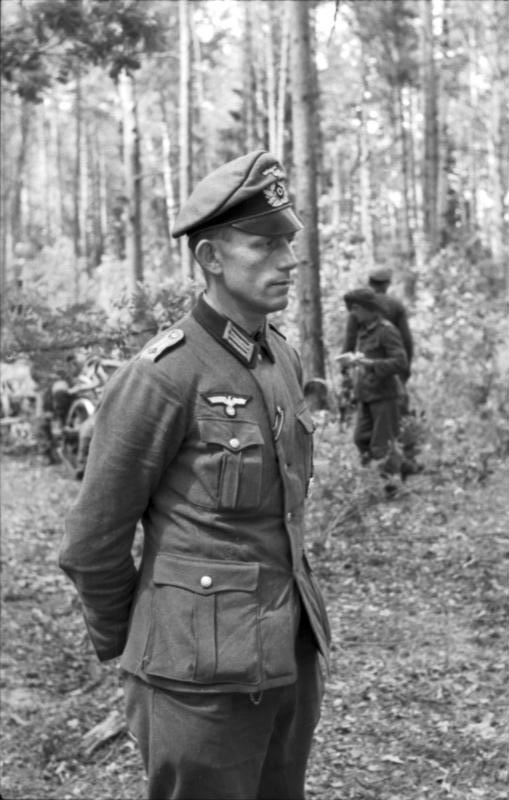
Oberleutnant wearing an Offizierfeldmütze älterer Art (old-style officers' field cap) in Russia in 1943. (Note: Although superficially similar, this cap can be distinguished from a Schirmmütze worn without the wire stiffener by (i) the lack of a moulded rim around the peak, (ii) the absence of chin cord and associated buttons, (iii) the shape of the machine-embroidered oak-leaf wreath surrounding the Reichskokarde (Note: Red, white and black cockade.) which differed from that of the metal wreath used on the Schirmmütze, and (iv) the use of an embroidered Hoheitsabzeichen, (Note: The eagle and swastika badge.) rather than the metal one used on the Schirmmütze, although an embroidered Hoheitsabzeichen was sometimes used by senior officers on the Schirmmütze, in contravention of regulations.)

The dress, service and walking-out cap for all ranks (Note: Prewar: in October 1939 issuance of the peaked cap to junior enlisted personnel (Mannschaften) was suspended; although private purchase was still permitted, wear was only permitted for walking-out.) was the peaked cap as finalized in 1934. The semi-rigid band was covered in bottle-green fabric, and the stiff visor came in variety of materials and were made of either black vulcanized rubber, fibre, plastic, or (occasionally) patent leather. The oval wool crown was stiffened with wire into a curved "saddleback" shape with a high front. Insignia consisted of the national cockade surrounded by an oakleaf wreath on the front of the band, with the Wehrmachtsadler above; these were stamped aluminum or sometimes embroidered in bullion for officers (silver for company and field-grade officers, and gold for generals). The edges of the band and crown were piped in Waffenfarbe. Enlisted men wore the cap with a black leather chinstrap; officers wore a pair of braided silver or aluminum cords (gold for generals). NCOs were authorized to wear the Schirmmütze when the uniform of the day prescribed the field cap.

Officers' caps were frequently private-purchase and had covers of higher-quality fabric; these were often interchangeable and included summer white and tropical olive versions as well as feldgrau.

==== Officers' "old style" field cap or "crusher" ====
At the same time the M34 side-cap was introduced for enlisted wear, a folding field cap for officers was authorized. Superficially resembling the Schirmmütze, this cap had a crown of significantly smaller diameter without the wire stiffener, a soft band, and a visor of flexible leather or feldgrau wool. Insignia were jacquard-woven; although no chinstrap was authorized officers often added the Schirmmütze silver cords. This cap was officially replaced by the officers' Schiffchen M38, with a wear-out date of 1 April 1942, but this order was generally ignored and the popular Knautschmütze was worn throughout the war, coming to be known as the ältere Art ('old style') field cap.

Officers and NCOs in the field would sometimes remove the wire stiffener from the Schirmmütze to achieve the "crush" look, especially tank crewmen (to facilitate wearing headphones); this unauthorized but widespread practice should not be confused with the true "crusher".

=== Helmets ===
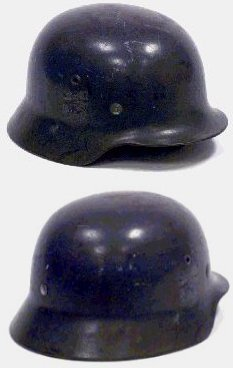
World War II Stahlhelm

In 1935 the Wehrmacht adopted a lower, lighter version of the M1916/18 "coal scuttle" helmet; this became the ubiquitous German helmet of World War II, worn by all branches of the Wehrmacht and SS, police, fire brigades and Party organizations. Collectors distinguish slight production variants as the M35, M40 and M42. Heer helmets were originally painted "apple green", a semigloss feldgrau somewhat darker than the uniform color; wartime factory and field painting covered a gamut from very dark black-green to slate-grey to olive-green (and sand-yellow in Africa), increasingly in matte or textured paint to eliminate reflections. The Army began issuing camouflage helmet covers in 1942, first in Splittertarnmuster (splinter-pattern) and then in Sumpftarnmuster (swamp/marsh or "water" pattern); these were never plentiful and individual soldiers frequently improvised helmet covers from splinter-pattern Zeltbahn (tent/poncho) fabric, or less frequently hand-painted their helmets in camouflage patterns. Soldiers would also cover their helmets with netting or chicken wire into which foliage could be inserted.

Heer helmet decals

Prewar and early-war Army Stahlhelme had shield-shaped decals on either side, black-white-red diagonal stripes on the right and the Heeresadler (Army eagle) in silver-grey on the left; in 1940 the national colors and then in 1943 the eagle were discontinued, and existing decals were often covered up during repainting. (Note: Hollywood movies, even those set on the Western front in 1944–45, routinely use reproduction Stahlhelme with dual decals; this is an anachronism.) During this early period, SS helmets carried a red shield with swastika on the left and a white shield with the SS sig-runes on the right. The Navy was as the Army but with the eagle in gold, and Luftwaffe helmets substituted that branch's eagle.

=== Boots ===
==== Jackboots (Marschstiefel "marching boots") ====
The calf-high pull-on jackboot had been the traditional footwear of the German soldier for generations. The Wehrmacht boot was little different from that of World War I: made of brown pebbled leather (blackened with polish), with hobnailed leather soles and heel-irons. Trousers were worn tucked inside. Originally 35–39 cm (14–15 in) tall, the boots were shortened to 32–35 cm (13–14 in) in 1939 in order to save leather. By 1940 leather was becoming more scarce and issue was restricted to combat branches, and in 1941 jackboots were no longer issued to new recruits. By late 1943 production of jackboots had ceased altogether. However, as late as fall 1944 depots were encouraged to issue Marschstiefel to infantry and artillery, to the extent they were available.

Officers' boots were knee-high and more form-fitting, and (as usual) often private purchases of superior quality. They were to be worn with breeches; however, these technically were not "riding" boots, differing somewhat from the Reitstiefel worn (with spurs) by regiments with cavalry traditions. (Note: The Heer fielded actual mounted units, both cavalry and horse transport; in addition to these a number of motorized units claimed descent from the horse cavalry, including the entire 24th Panzer Division.) By order dated 31 October 1939 most officers in the front lines wore the shorter EM boots with Langhosen or Keilhosen, but some ignored regulations and wore their kneeboots anyway.

==== Ankle boots (Schnürschuhe "lace-up shoes") ====
From 1937 each recruit was issued a pair of ankle-height work boots for basic training, and kept them for fatigue duty and the like. Beginning in 1940 the Army ceased issuing jackboots to rear-area personnel and authorized the wearing of the utility boots with the field uniform; canvas gaiters or Gamaschen were issued for this purpose. From 1941 Schnürschuhe were authorized for combat units as well, and the only footgear issued to new recruits; by 1943 their wear had become universal to all German Wehrmacht.

=== Officers ===
Also in 1935 the Heer introduced a new service tunic for officers and senior NCOs. This was broadly similar to the other-ranks tunic, but differed in detail: the collar was of a taller, more pointed rise-and-fall type, the shoulders were padded, the sleeves had deep turnback cuffs, there was no internal suspension system or grommets for belt hooks, and there were two ramp-buttons at the back of the waist to support the belt. Since officers had to purchase their own uniforms, many of these tunics were either tailor-made or produced by gentlemen's clothiers, and if purchased for service dress for the most part used high-quality wool gabardine (Trikot), doeskin or whipcord. For this reason the officers' Dienstrock did not undergo the cost-saving changes which affected the enlisted M36, and kept its green collar and scalloped, pleated pockets throughout the war. After the Army authorized wearing the collar open with a necktie in 1943, some officers' tunics were made with fixed lapels like the Luftwaffe Tuchrock.

Trousers were either slate-grey (later field-grey) Langhosen, or breeches worn with high boots. Generals and General Staff officers wore wide trouser-stripes of scarlet or carmine-red, respectively.

Although the M35 remained the regulation service-dress uniform, soon after the outbreak of the war, officers in combat units of the rank of regimental commander or below were ordered to wear the more practical (and less conspicuous) other-ranks uniform for frontline service, and save the "good" uniform for walking-out, office and garrison wear; some of these EM tunics were privately modified with French cuffs and officer-style collars. Nonetheless, many officers ignored regulations and wore the Dienstrock at the front, sometimes even with breeches.

== Dress uniforms ==
=== Waffenrock ===
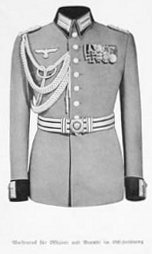
Waffenrock

The Waffenrock (military coat) was descended from that introduced by the Prussian Army in 1842 and rapidly adopted by the other German states. In its Wehrmacht form as issued in 1935, it was a formfitting thigh-length eight-button tunic of fine feldgrau wool, without external pockets. The collar was taller than the service tunic and bore more elaborate Litzen embroidered all in silver-white and mounted on Waffenfarbe backing; smaller Ärmelpatten, similar in appearance to Litzen, appeared under the buttons on the dark-green Swedish cuffs. Waffenfarbe piping also edged the collar, cuffs, front closure, and scalloped rear vent.

Officers wore a formal belt of silver braid. Trousers were steingrau, with the outer seams piped in Waffenfarbe. In the full-dress uniform (grosser Gesellschaftanzug) the Waffenrock was worn with medals, aiguillette (officers), trousers and shoes, the Schirmmütze, gloves, and sword (officers/senior NCOs) or dress bayonet (enlisted). Parade dress substituted the steel helmet and jackboots. Semi-formal (kleiner Gesellschaftanzug) and walking-out (Ausgangsanzug) uniforms were as full-dress, but without aiguillette and with ribbons replacing medals.

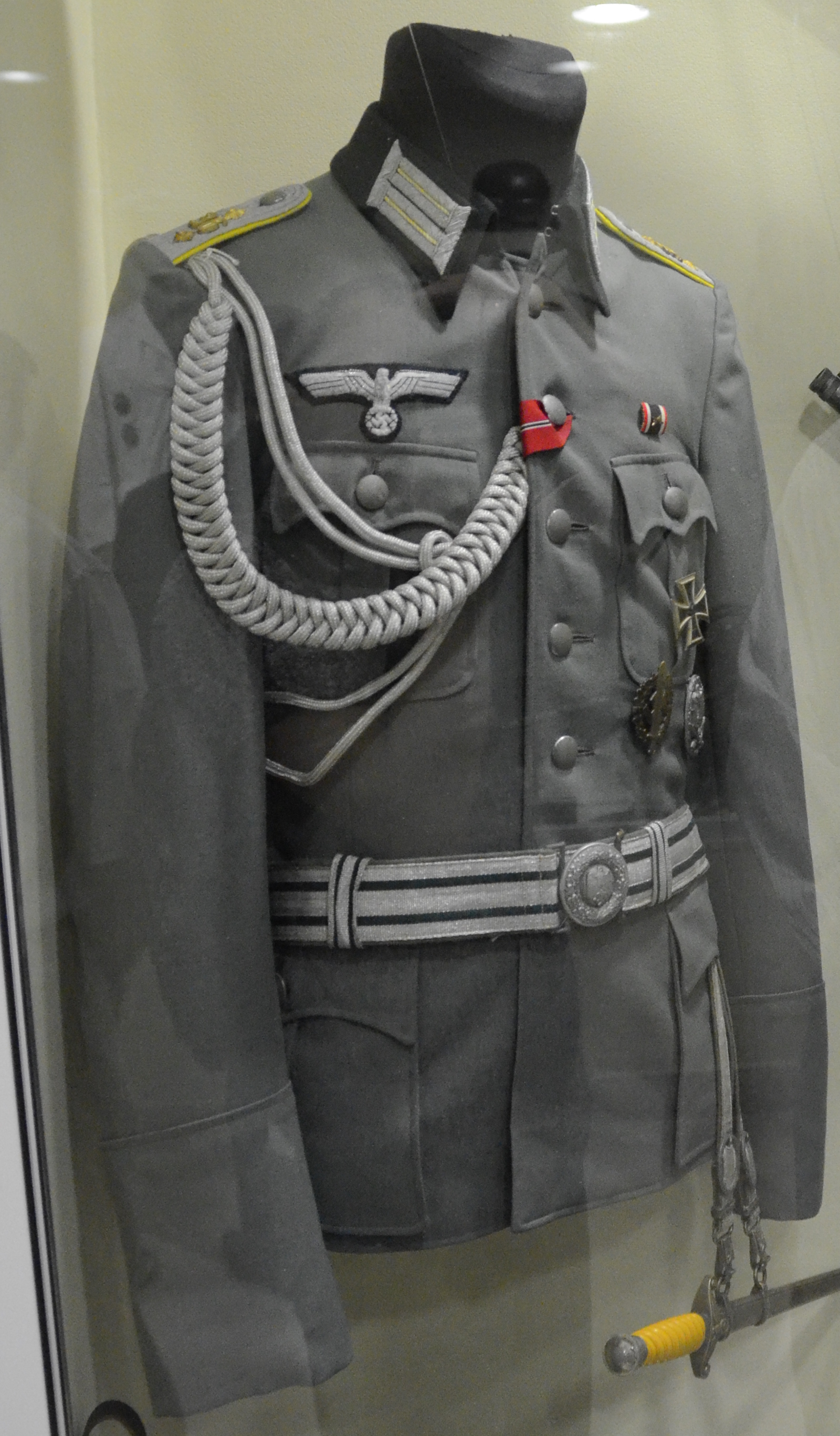
An officer's M35/36 Feldbluse used for walking-out instead of the M37 ornamented tunic

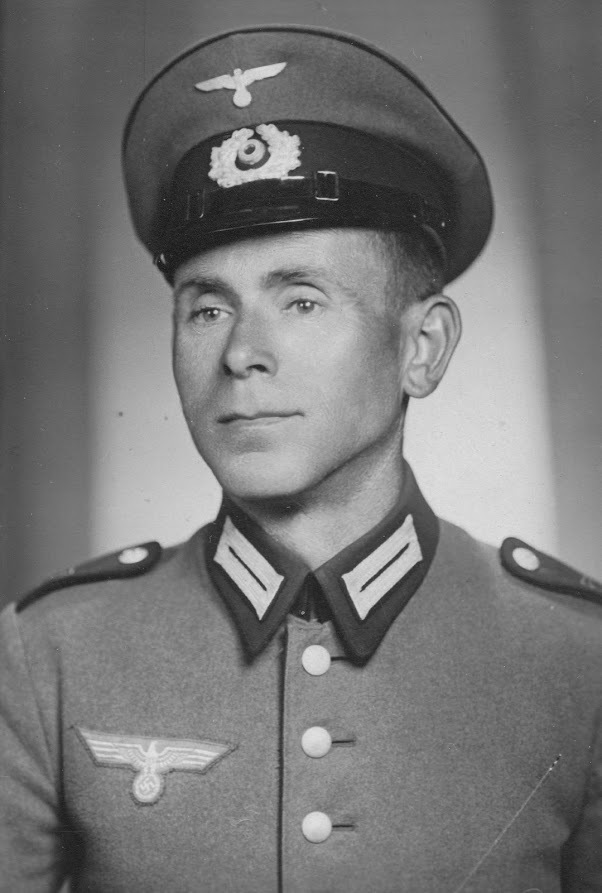
1943 Parade Tunic for Heer Pioneer Battalion (Enlisted)

Production and issue of the Waffenrock was suspended in 1940, and either the service or the officers' ornamented uniform was worn for dress occasions instead. However, the Waffenrock remained authorized for walking out for those who had or could purchase it; and it was a widespread if unauthorized practice to loan a soldier a Waffenrock from regimental stocks to get married in, as evidenced by many wartime wedding photos.

==== Großdeutschland specific ====
A Waffenrock uniform was designed specifically for the Infantry Regiment Großdeutschland, however they were never widely issued and were placed in storage awaiting the end of the war.

=== Officers' ornamented uniform (M37) ===
In 1937 officers were authorized the optional purchase of the "ornamented" (ornamentierte) or "piped" (mit Vorstössen) uniform, to be worn as a less-formal alternative to the Waffenrock for walking-out and some ceremonial occasions. The M37 Feldbluse was identical to the M35 service tunic, save that the collar and its Litzen were the same as the Waffenrock, and collar, closure and cuffs were piped in Waffenfarbe. It was worn with the piped dress trousers. From 1940 the M37 replaced the Waffenrock for formal and ceremonial dress.

=== Summer white tunic ===
Different summer white tunic

Ältere Art tunic

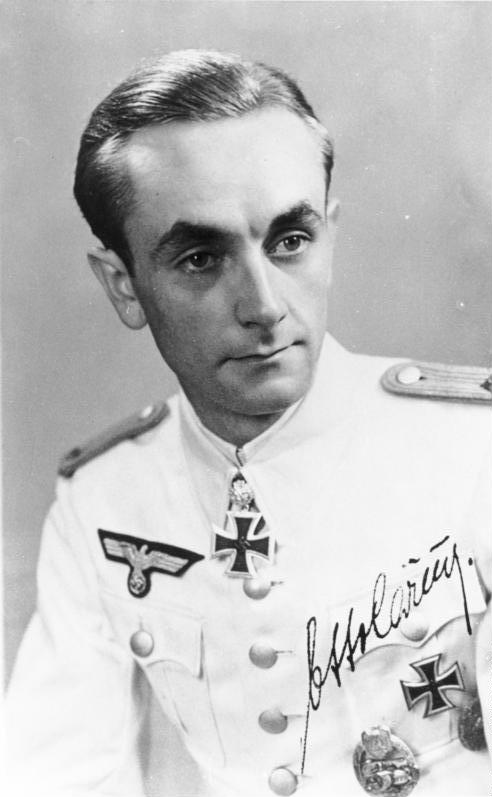
Neue Art tunic (Note: Instead of the regulation metal pin-on breast eagle, this example has an embroidered one, apparently the black-backed type for wear with the Panzer uniform)

Officers and certain senior NCOs had the option of wearing a white cotton tunic from April through September. The Reichswehr "old-style" (ältere Art) model had a stand collar, a six-button front, and plain sleeves; it was authorized for barracks wear, supervising training, and attending sporting events. The newer model introduced in 1937 had a rise-and-fall collar, an eight-button front, and French cuffs, and was authorized as a summer walking-out and undress uniform. Both versions had removable buttons, shoulderboards and metal breast eagle in order to permit laundering; collar insignia was not worn.

== Panzer uniform ==
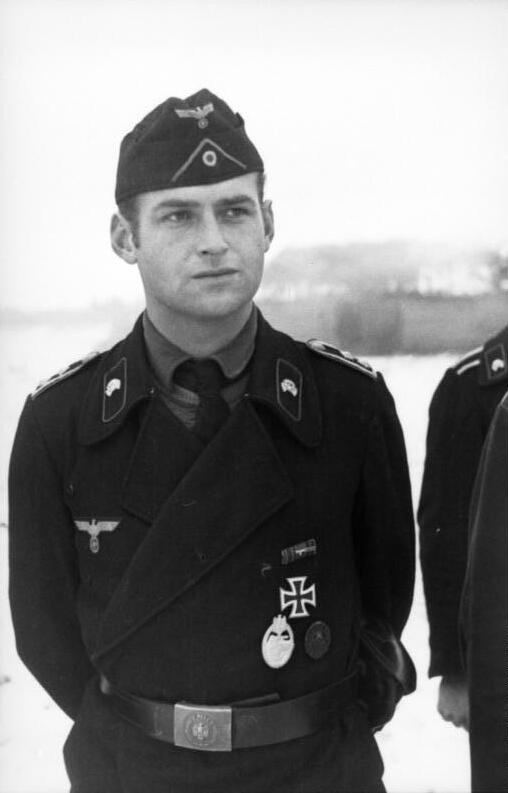
Oberfeldwebel, Panzer troops, 1941

The Panzer uniform (German: Sonderbekleidung der Panzertruppen lit. 'Special Clothing for the Panzer Troops') consisted of black wool hip-length double-breasted jacket and trousers, with skulls (Note: The Panzer Totenkopf was different from that worn by the SS: the tankers' version was full-face and had no lower jaw) on the collar patches instead of Litzen and, officially until 1942, collar piping in Waffenfarbe (usually the rose-pink of the armor branch, but also gold for former cavalry units in the reconnaissance role or black/white twist for combat engineers). The color and Totenköpfe (skulls) were chosen due to their similarity to the uniforms of August von Mackensen's Black Hussars, and also for practical reasons: the black color made oil stains less visible and a short jacket was less likely to get caught in the machinery. The trousers had tapered cuffs with drawstrings and tapes in order to fit into lace-up ankle boots. Although the jacket could be buttoned to the neck in cold weather, ordinarily it was worn open-collar with a field grey or mouse grey shirt and (in theory) a black necktie.

The jacket was manufactured in three different patterns between 1934 and 1945. First pattern jackets had deep lapels with square collars. There was also no provision to close the collar. Second pattern (1936–1942) added three buttons to close the collar, reduced the size of the lapels and had a more pointed collar. Note that some second pattern jackets were produced without collar piping (possibly for non-panzer personnel entitled to wear the jacket). The third pattern (1942–1945) deleted the collar piping for all personnel but was otherwise similar to second pattern.

Self-propelled anti-tank artillery (Panzerjäger) and assault-gun (Sturmgeschütz) crews were issued similar uniforms in field-grey from 1940.

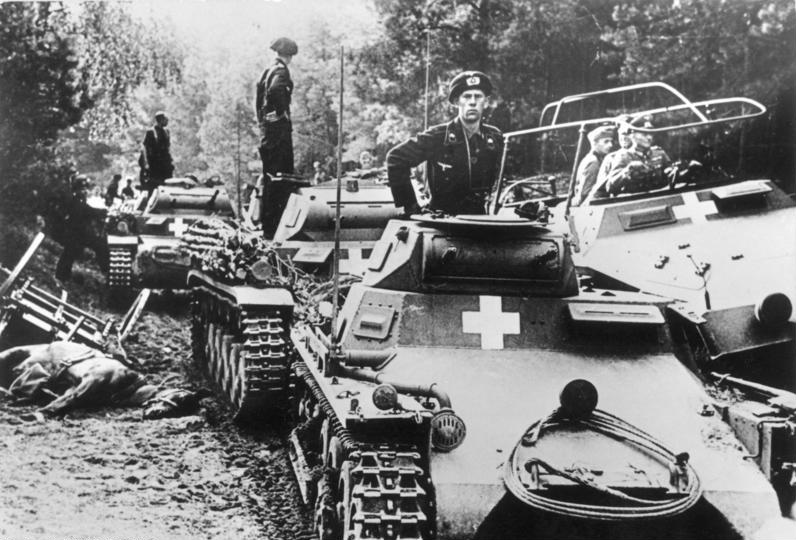
Panzercommandant wearing a beret

Originally a large black beret was worn over a hardened-felt helmet. This proved cumbersome and unnecessary and on 27 March 1940 a black version of the standard M34/M38 sidecap was authorized; later in the war the M43 field cap in black was worn. Officers frequently wore old-style (altere Art) "crusher" peaked caps.

Vehicle crews in North Africa wore the same olive tropical uniform as the infantry, including collarLitzen; many tankers pinned their skull insignia to their lapels.

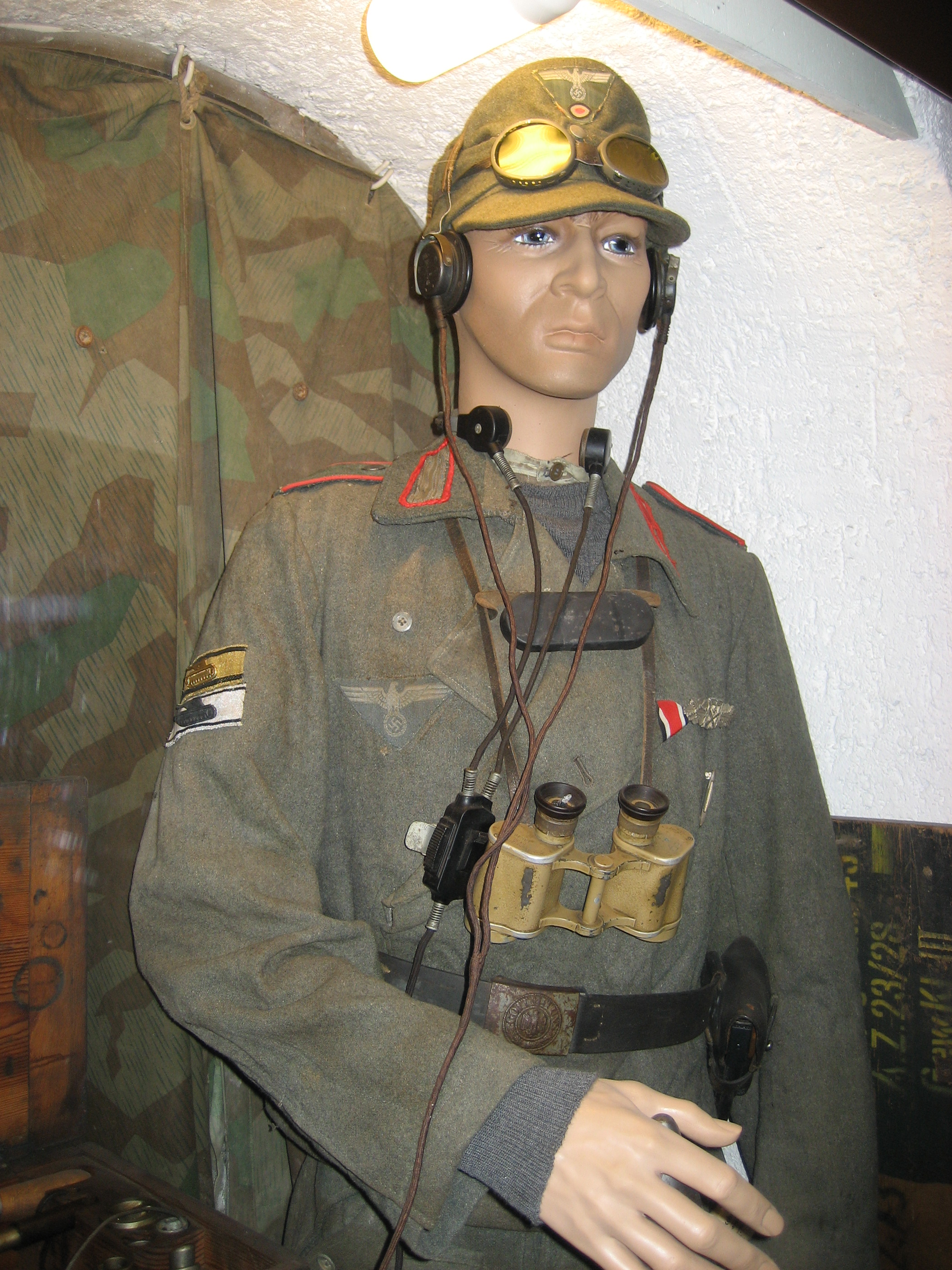
Uniform of assault gun crew

In 1943 the Panzertruppe were issued their own reed-green HBT summer field uniform. This resembled the black uniform but had a single, very large pocket on the left breast and another on the front of the left thigh.

A one-piece denim overall, known as a Panzerkombi, was issued to panzer (armoured) crews and mechanics for maintenance work and the like; crews sometimes wore it for general field service although the practice was discouraged. Originally issued in blue-grey, the Waffen-SS later used camouflage-printed examples. It featured zips running down the inside of the dump leg which could be used to zip both legs together to make a sleeping bag.

The similarities between the Panzer uniform and the SS Panzer uniform, and the use of a Totenkopf emblem by both, led to incidents of Army Panzer crewmen being shot by Allied soldiers who assumed they were SS members. Ironically the infamous black Allgemeine SS uniform, familiar from prewar newsreels, was not worn by combat troops; the Waffen-SS wore feldgrau or camouflage.

== Winter uniform ==
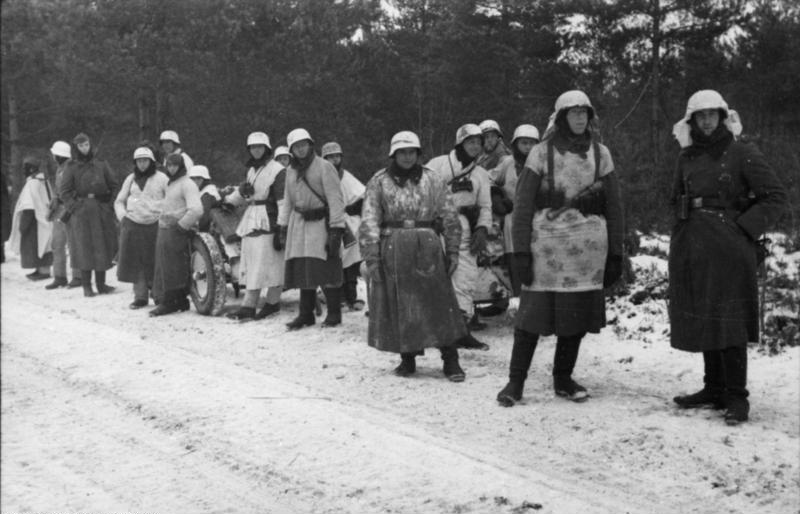
Early improvised winter camouflage uniforms in October 1941.

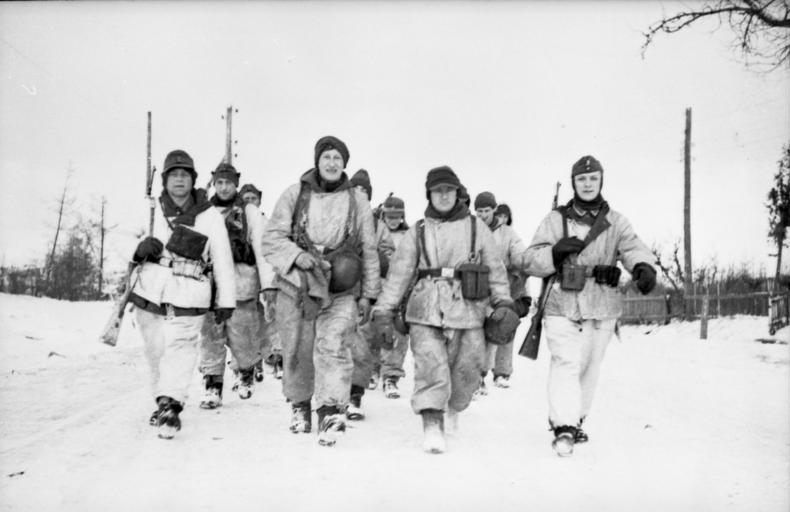
Improved winter uniforms in January 1944.

Early in the war, this consisted of heavy wool greatcoats (a similar pattern was issued to East German border guards until 1989). They had silver dimpled buttons that did not reflect the light and were sometimes painted green to provide further camouflage. Following Hitler's invasion of the USSR, the Germans found themselves ill-equipped to deal with the Russian winter at the end of 1941 and had to improvise. German civilians back home were called upon to donate fur coats and other winter clothing for the war effort until enough specialized military gear for the extreme cold had been produced. Hooded waterproof parkas were issued later in the war, in white for troops on the Eastern Front and in field-grey for mountain troops (Gebirgsjäger soldiers). In addition to the standard-issue snow camouflage, the Germans made extensive use of captured Red Army equipment, especially the fur boots, which provided better protection from the sub-zero temperatures. German troops took drastic action to obtain their winter uniform and gear from dead Russian soldiers, including even cutting off the legs of the corpses to get off their thick boots.

== Tropical uniform ==
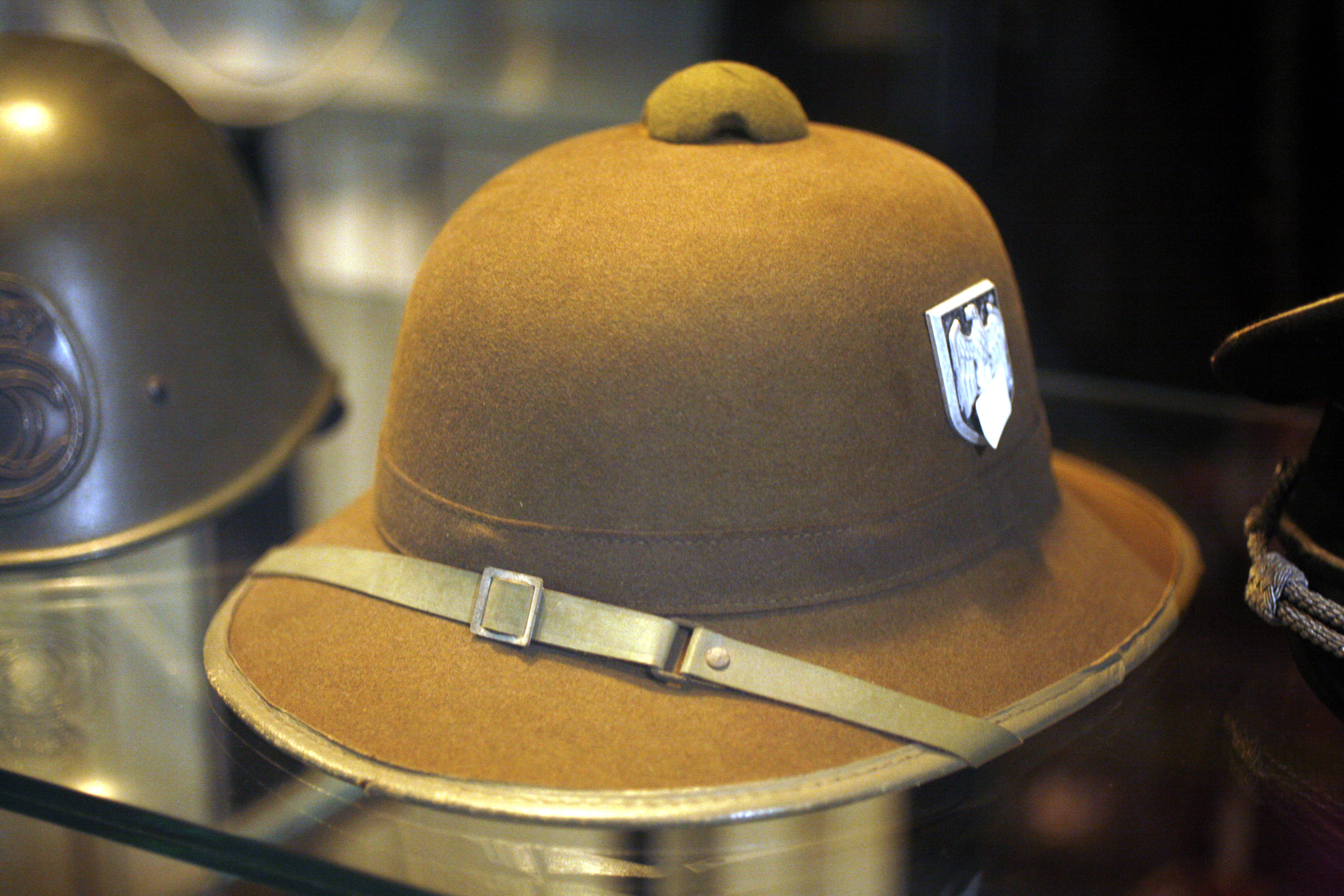
German pith helmet in olive drab

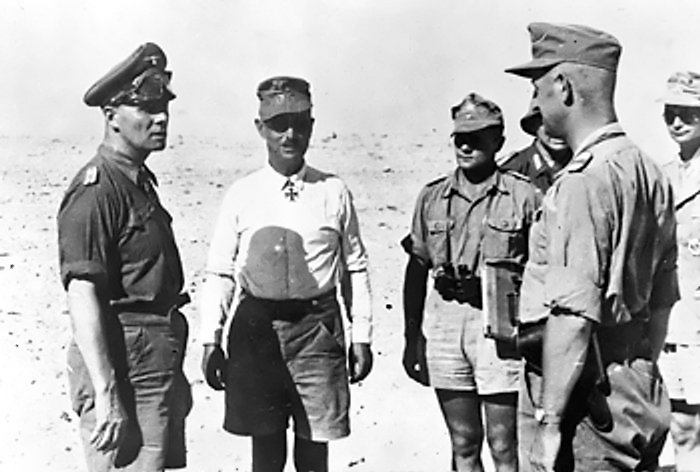
Erwin Rommel and officers, 1942

The M40 Tropical tunics of the Afrikakorps, later authorized for summer field wear in Southern Europe, were basically the same cut as the standard army uniform but with open collar and lapels, and made of a medium-weight olive-drab cotton twill which in service faded to khaki. Also olive were the shirt and the seldom-worn necktie. Insignia were embroidered in dull blue-grey on tan backing cloth. This tunic was issued to all Army personnel in North Africa, including officers and Panzer crews. Officers as usual often purchased uniforms privately, and olive, khaki or mustard-yellow cotton versions of the M35 officers' tunic were worn alongside the standard issue, sometimes with green collars. The M40 Tropical breeches were of jodhpur type, to be worn with knee-boots or puttees: these were very unpopular and most were soon cut off to make shorts (captured British/Commonwealth shorts were frequently worn as well). By mid-1941 conventional trousers in olive cotton were being issued, followed soon thereafter by regulation Heer shorts; these had a built-in cloth belt. A chocolate brown overcoat in the same pattern as the continental version was issued as protection from the cold desert nights.

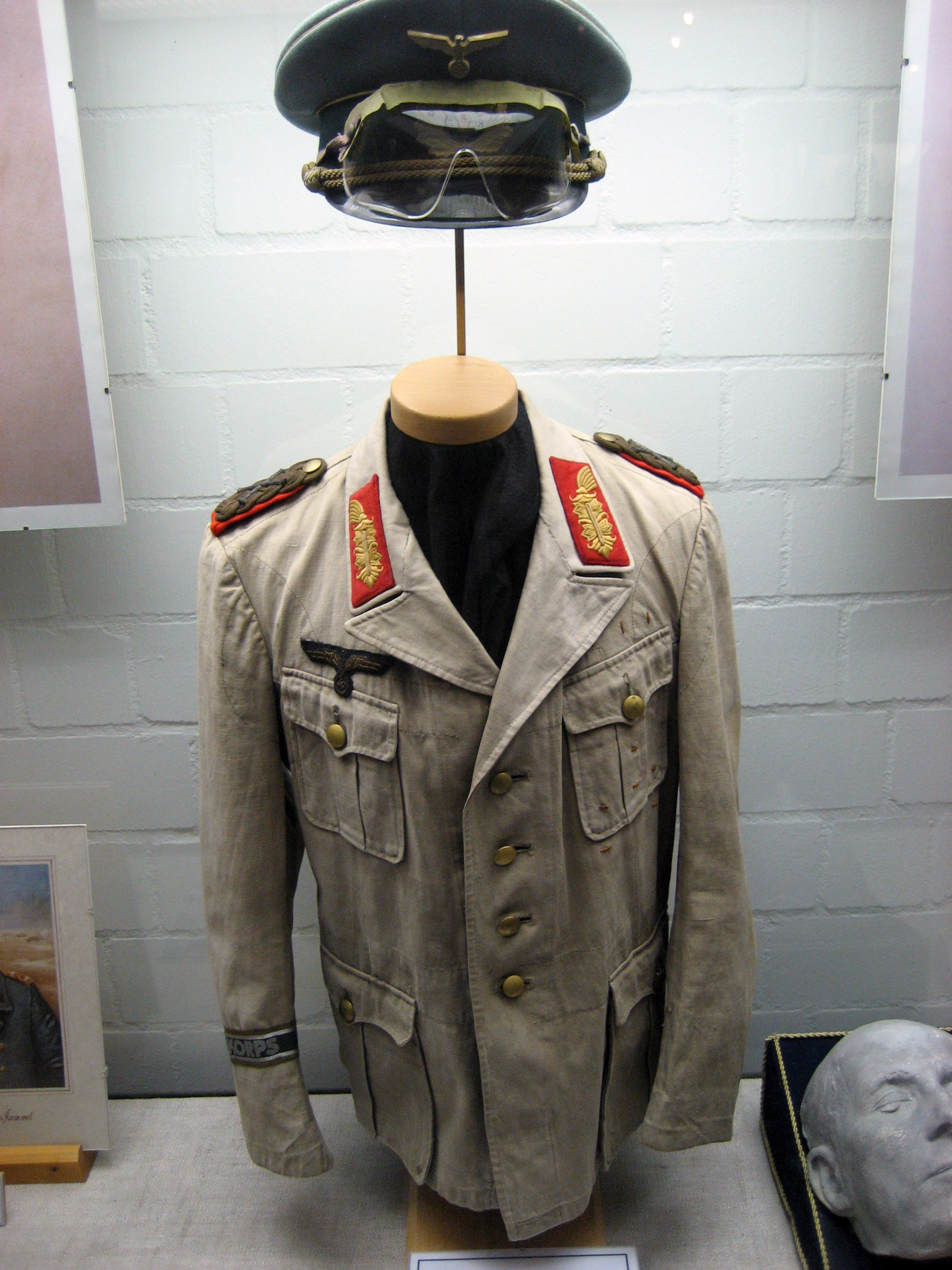
Rommel's Afrika Korps uniform. Note that the color, originally olive, is faded to greenish khaki.

Pith helmets, ankle boots with puttees, and lace-up canvas knee-boots were also issued in 1941 as protection from the sand and hot tropical sun; the puttees disappeared quickly and the hated knee-boots were for the most part cut down to ankle length. The pith helmets, although effective against the sun, proved bulky and impractical in front-line service and were usually only worn in rear areas. For combat situations, standard steel helmets field-painted in a tan color were issued, usually vehicle interior sand-yellow (sandgelb) or exterior brown-yellow (gelbbraun). The Afrikakorps' soft cap was the M40 visored (peaked) cap similar in shape to that of the mountain troops (Gebirgsjäger). This extremely popular cap was made of olive-drab cotton twill lined with loosely woven red cotton fabric for protection from the sun and effective heat transfer from the head. It had a long visor, one-piece "false fold" rather than functional earflaps, and two metal ventilation eyelets on each side; for all but the most extreme climate conditions the M40 cap was generally preferred over the pith helmets. Also worn but less popular, except with Panzer personnel, was an olive cotton version of the M34 Schiffchen sidecap.

The Luftwaffe tropical uniform differed significantly from the Army version. Air force uniforms were made of a yellowish-khaki cotton twill that proved to be a more effective camouflage color in the North African desert than Army olive, although the latter did fade to a sage-tan color with use and sun exposure. Its cut was also considered more practical and suited to the local climate than that of the early Army tropical uniform, with loosely cut trousers, a closed-collar tunic, and tan shirt. Unlike the Army, no special tropical overcoat was issued. Headgear, also in tan, initially consisted of a sidecap, pith helmet, or a unique tropical peaked cap design with detachable neckshade, although the latter was eventually replaced with a version of the Army M40 tropical cap in Luftwaffe tan.

When Tobruk was taken in June 1942, over 18,000 British khaki uniforms were captured; the Panzerarmee Afrika, perennially short of supplies, issued this store of shirts, shorts and boots to their own troops who wore them with German insignia.

== HBT fatigue and summer uniforms ==
Most recruits previous to 1940 were issued a fatigue uniform (Drillichanzug) for basic training which they kept for work details, weapons cleaning and other duties likely to soil clothes. This was an unlined, insignia-less uniform made of linen or cotton herringbone twill (HBT) that typically had two buttonless patch pockets on the skirt; enlisted versions had a standing collar while NCO and officer versions had rise-and-fall collars. The fatigue uniform originally was undyed and therefore a colour that ranged from white to oatmeal to cement grey. On 12 February 1940 the colour was ordered to be changed to a bluish green called "reed-green".

Since the heavy wool feldgrau uniform proved to be oppressively hot in summer weather, especially in southerly latitudes, soldiers took to wearing their lightweight green fatigue uniforms in the heat. In about 1942 the Army regularized the practice: depots began issuing an official hot-weather four-pocket field uniform of feldbluse cut but made of the same reed-green HBT material. For the enlisted Heer, these were usually worn with collar insignia and national eagle. NCOs would typically wear the summer uniform (Sommerfeldanzug) with appropriate rank on their shoulder boards, but the collar braid seen on the wool uniforms was typically absent. Two models were approved for use in the Army, the first that was designed after the M40 feldbluse and a later model that removed the front pocket pleats and pocket flap scallops similar to the M43. From 1943 a double-breasted version based on the Panzerjacke} was made for vehicle and assault gun crews. SS units never had an official unique summer uniform, and while some used the Army versions, most used the earlier dyed work fatigues without insignia. While commissioned officers did have bespoke summer uniforms made, there was no regulation summer field uniform.

== Camouflage ==
The Germans were first issued disruptively patterned camouflage in 1931. During the war two distinctive patterns were in use: Splittermuster (splinter pattern) and its softer-edged variant Sumpftarnmuster (swamp pattern), and Platanenmuster (plane tree pattern). Splinter Pattern was originally used for tents but was later applied by the Luftwaffe to the knochensack jump smocks of the Fallschirmjäger, and fashioned into camouflage smocks for the infantry, while Platanenmuster was worn by the Waffen-SS. Flecktarn, an updated version of the earlier plane tree pattern, is still used by the modern German Bundeswehr.

In 1945 a new 6-colour camouflage known as Leibermuster, which inspired the postwar US ERDL pattern, was introduced. The colors were black, tan, olive, pale green, white, and red-brown.

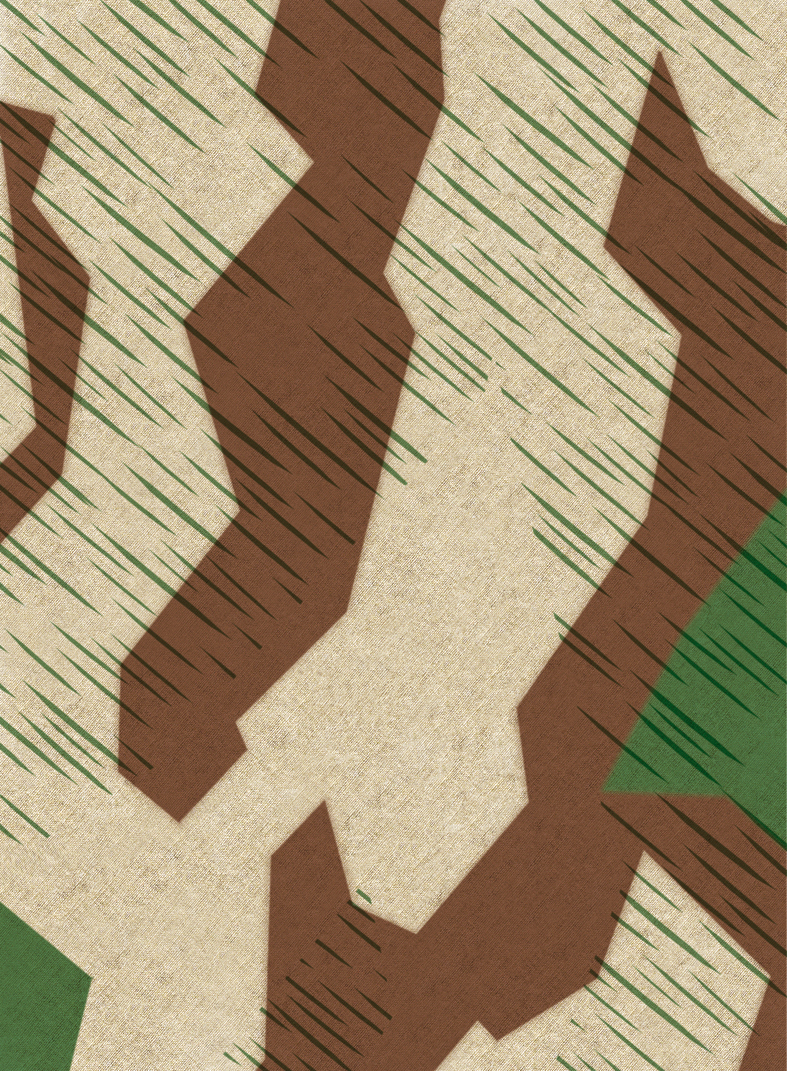
Splittermuster (Splinter pattern)

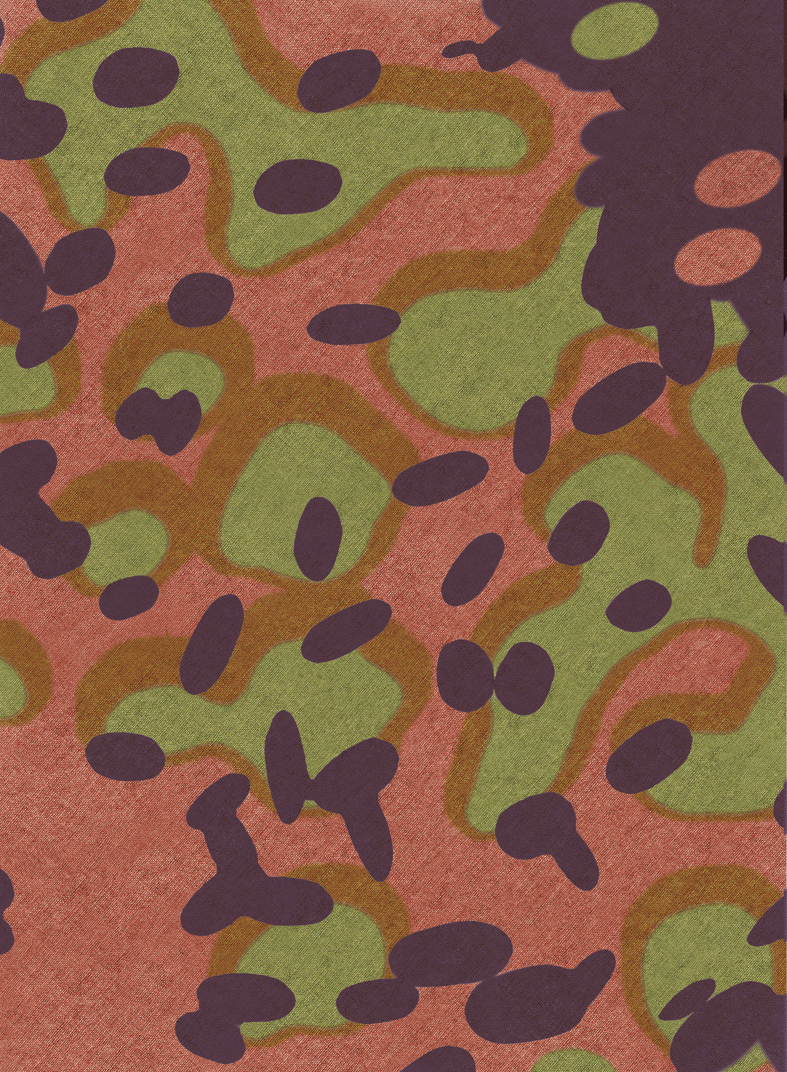
Platanenmuster (Plane tree pattern)

== See also ==
- Ranks and insignia of the Heer (1935–1945)
- Glossary of German World War II military terms
- Comparative officer ranks of World War II
- Uniforms and insignia of the Kriegsmarine
- Uniforms of the Luftwaffe (1935–45)
- Uniforms and insignia of the Schutzstaffel
