= Jump smock =

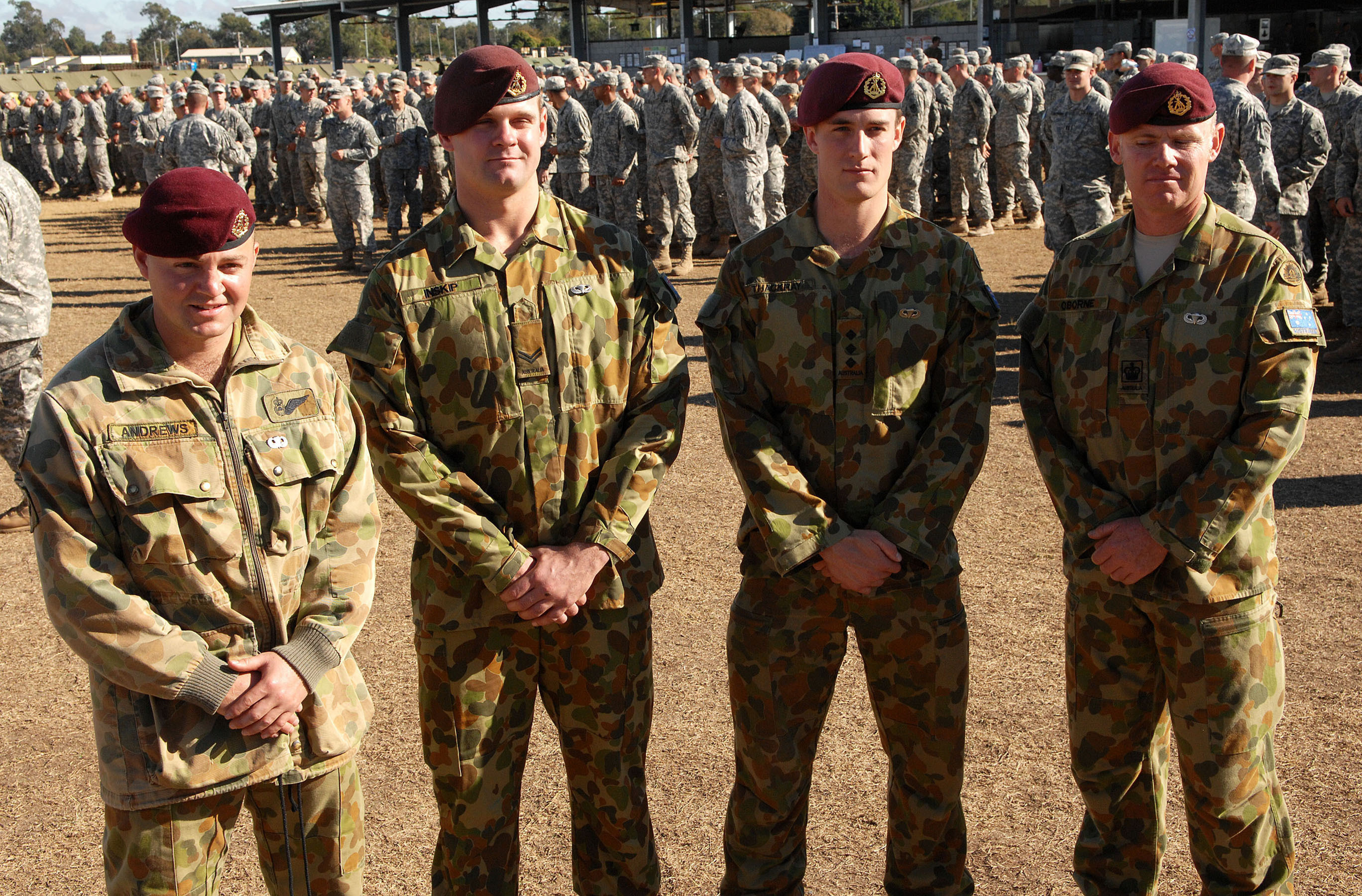
Australian Paratrooper of 3RAR wearing a DPCU Para Smock.

Jump Smocks are combat jackets especially made for paratroopers or any member of the military involved in parachute deployment. They usually have the wraps around the lower half or sometimes crotch flaps that prevent the smock from 'billowing' during a parachute descent. Jump Smocks can be found worn by many militaries around the world with the most noted being the United Kingdom, Australia, Austria, Belgium, France, Mexico, Pakistan, and Iraq.

== See also ==
- Denison Smock
- Smock Parachutist DPM
- Knochensack
