= Uniforms of the Luftwaffe (1935–1945) =

Uniforms of the Luftwaffe 1944 (US poster)

The Luftwaffe was the air force of Nazi Germany prior to and during World War II. Luftwaffe styles of uniform and rank insignia had many unique features between 1935 and 1945. By Hitler's decision on February 26, 1935, the Luftwaffe was to be officially the third branch of the Wehrmacht as of March 1, 1935. The new Luftwaffe was faced with the problem of uniforms, as they wanted a uniform distinct from those of the other two branches of the Wehrmacht (Heer and Kriegsmarine) and also wanted a clear differentiation in dress of military and civilian flyers.

== Uniforms ==
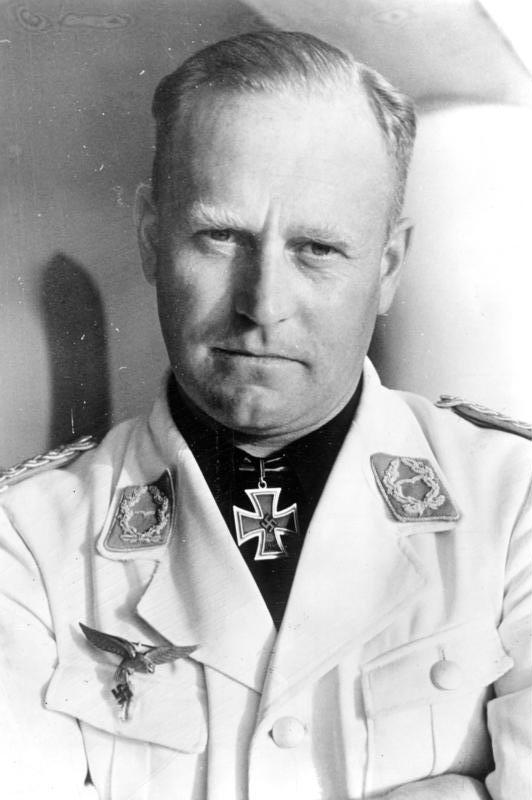
Edgar Petersen wearing white tunic uniform

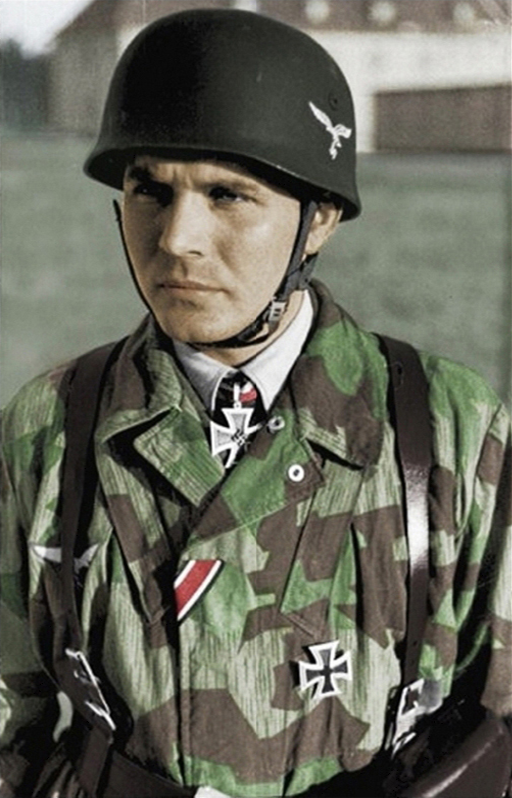
Fallschirmjäger Dr. Bruno Sassen wearing a Luftwaffe Fallschirmjäger helmet

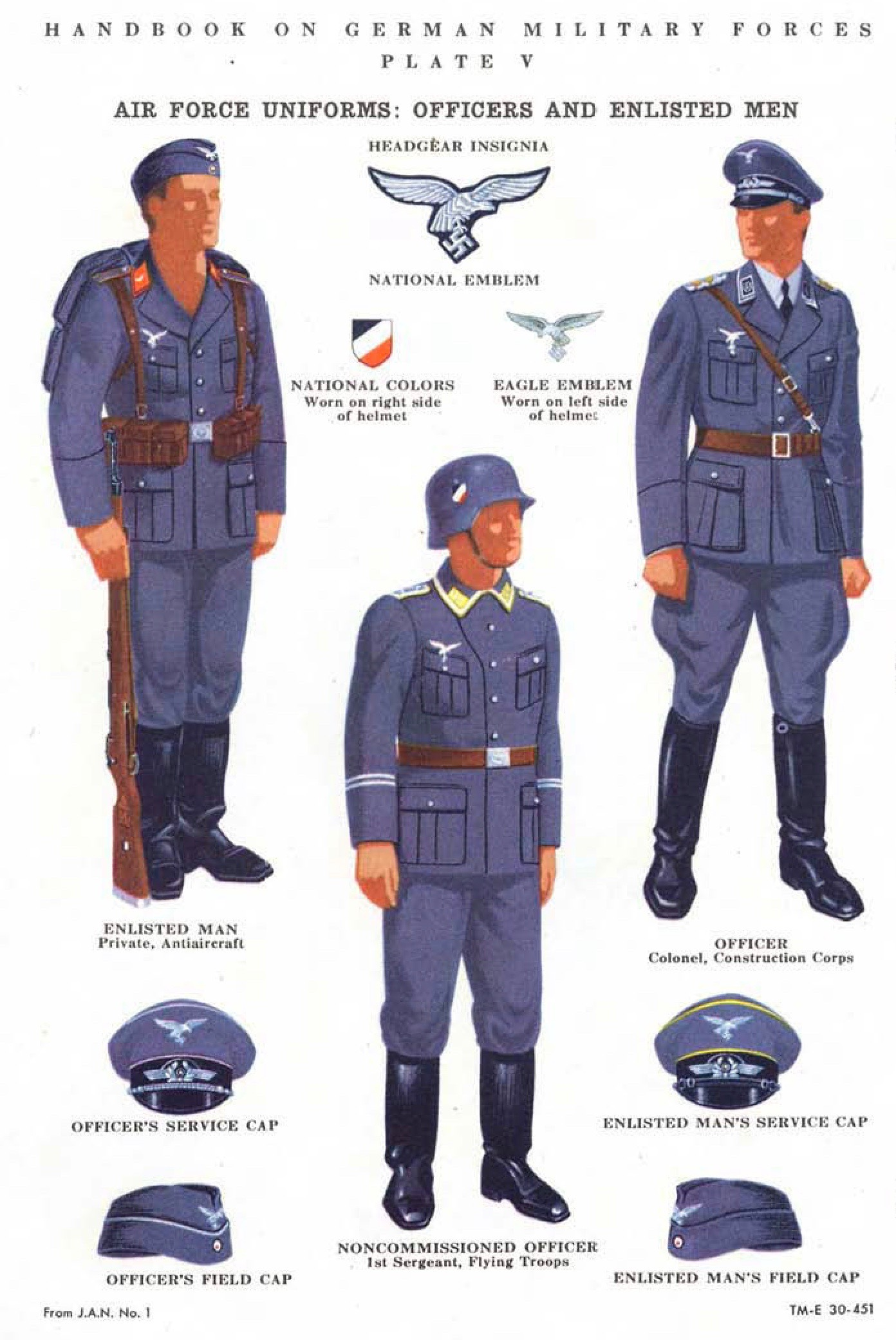
WW2 German air force uniforms officers and enlisted men Illustration: "Handbook On German Military Forces" (US War Department, 1943)

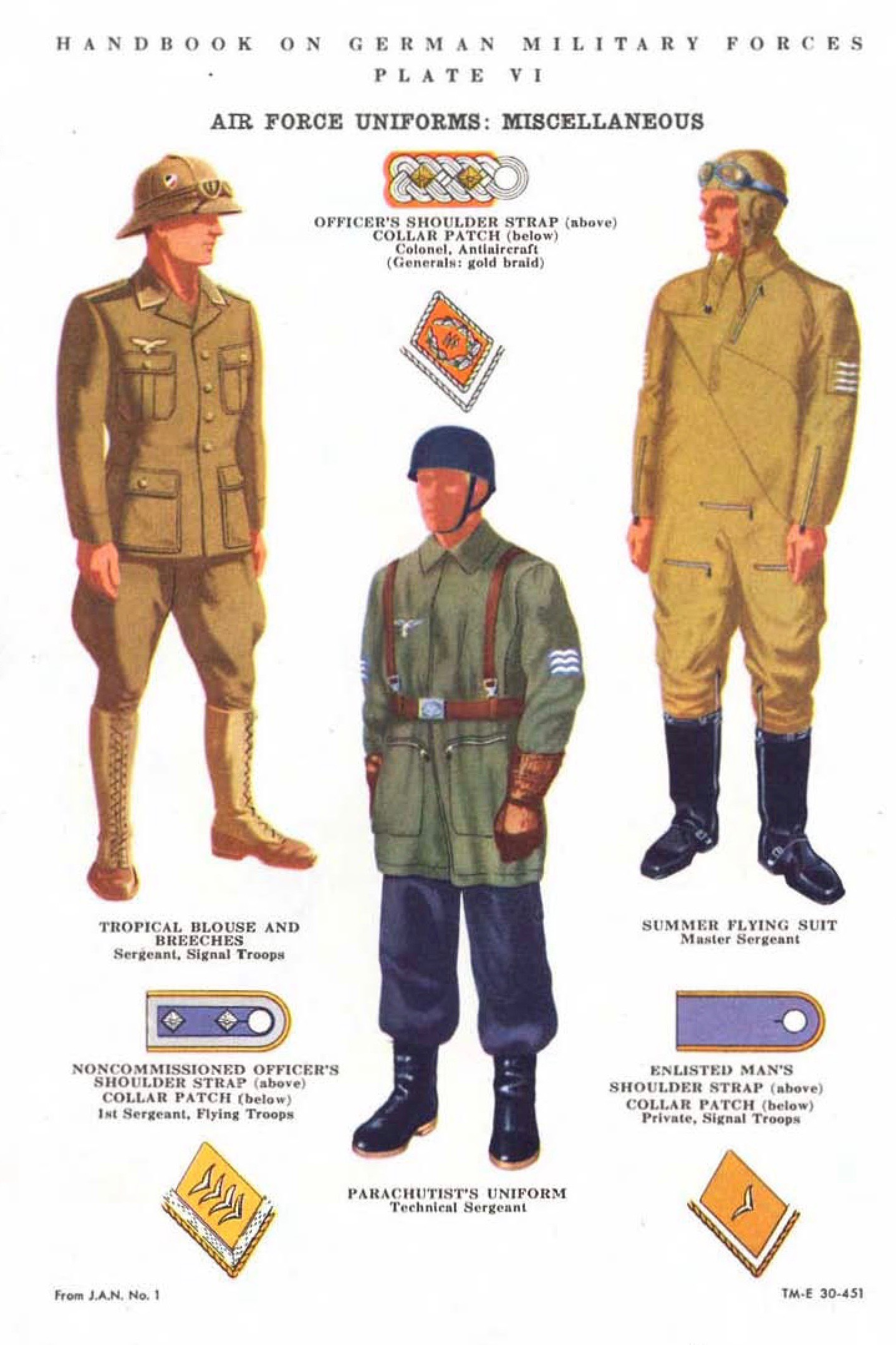
WW2 German Air force uniforms: miscellaneous Illustration: "Handbook On German Military Forces" (US War Department, 1943)

The basic uniform consisted of a blue-grey single-breasted, open-collared jacket with four pockets and flaps, light blue shirt and dark blue necktie, blue-grey trousers, black leather boots and a blue-grey peaked cap, side cap or Model 1935 Stahlhelm. Ranks were indicated by seagull pips on collar patches, NCO braid along the collar's edge and on Army-style shoulder boards.

The flying suit typically consisted of a beige jumpsuit, leather flying helmet and thick fur-lined boots. Black leather jackets were also worn by fighter pilots. A popular item of clothing was the Fliegerbluse, a blue-grey, single-breasted jacket without external buttons, intended to be worn in the confined space of an aircraft.

As Reichsmarschall, Hermann Göring had specialized uniforms and insignia. The collar patches featured crossed batons; the shoulder boards were similar to that of a Field Marshal, but with a Reichsadler clutching the batons. The Luftwaffe eagle insignia was different from the rest of the Wehrmacht: its wings curved upward and the swastika did not have a circle around it. Though the Luftwaffe had variety of field divisions besides Flak units, it was the Hermann Göring Panzer Regiment – later Division – that was most unusual as the premier tank unit of the Luftwaffe. In late 1938 with the creation of the Panzerspähzug (armored reconnaissance platoon), the personnel of this company of the General Göring Regiment have taken the design of the Army styled black panzer uniform, but with Luftwaffe insignia, shoulder boards and collar patches.

A number of various uniforms evolved in cut and design which were designated to cover any occasion Luftwaffe personnel would encounter. Among these were:

- Flying suit for flying personnel
- Field Dress
- Service Dress
- Guard Uniform
- Undress Uniform for officers and NCOs which lead (on duty)
- Reporting Uniform
- Parade Dress
- Walking-Out Dress
- Informal Full Dress (day) for officers
- Formal Full Dress (day) for officers
- Informal Full Dress (evening) for officers
- Formal Full Dress (evening) for officers (m)Informal Full Dress for NCOs and men
- Formal Full Dress for NCOs and men
- Summer Uniform for officers
- Sports kit

=== Luftwaffe headgear ===
==== Paratrooper helmet ====
See article:Stahlhelm (Fallschirmjäger)

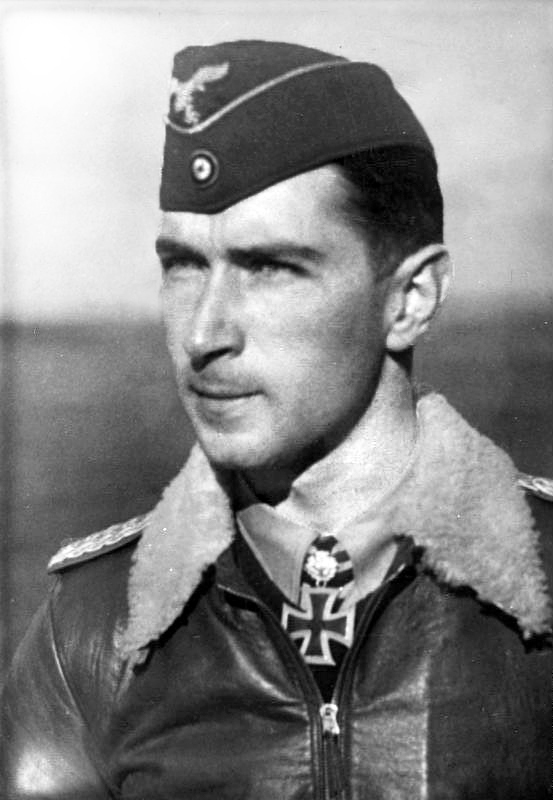
Werner Mölders wears an Officer's M35 Flying Cap (Fliegermütze), also called (side cap)

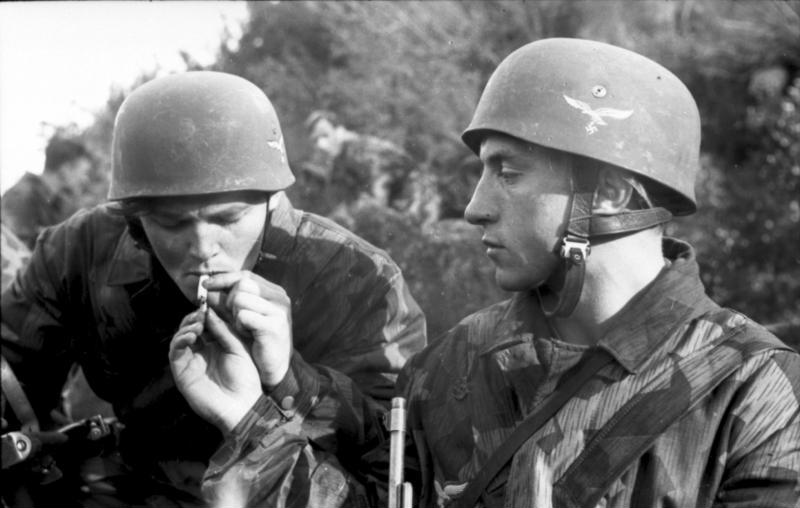
Fallschirmjäger in 1943/1944

The Luftwaffe introduced the Fallschirmjäger (Airborne and Glider borne troops) helmet in 1936. With its lighter weight and lack of helmet crimping, the Fallschirmjäger helmet was similar to the Model 1935 Stahlhelm but without a helmet edge. There was also more filling in the internal of the helmet to protect the head during airborne operations. The visor and ear guards were removed to enable the headgear to be more compact and thus avoiding much of the protrusive parts in air maneuvering. The necessity of a different strap assembly was provided to prevent the loss of the helmet in the air and also giving more safety to the chin and neck regions from jolts and pressures. The second Fallschirmjäger Division that saw service in North Africa, used the standard paratrooper helmet with Luftwaffe decal insignia. All were painted an Africa Korps tan, by the parachute riggers and personal equipment men of each Regt. They brushed on two or three coats of standard paint that was used on trucks. In doing this they covered up the flying eagle insignia. The paint jobs ran from excellent to poor, depending on how rushed they were and the craft ability of the artist.

==== Flying helmets ====
The LKp S-101 Luftwaffe Flying Helmet made by Siemens for the Luftwaffe. The 101 model is similar to the leather 100 model and was improved with brownish-grey flecked material lined with grey-green satin. Oval fleece cushions are fitted inside the helmet, over the ears, with plastic inserts tucked inside. Goggle straps and chinstraps are made of leather. The hard rubber ear cups are covered with dark brown leather and feature the ridge for goggle retention.

==== Caps ====
Luftwaffe side cap (Fliegermütze) is made in blue-grey wool and comes with silver cord piping on top of the turn-up for officers. The Luftwaffe side cap or Feldmütze comes with smaller version of Luftwaffe eagle and national cockade, while the Luftwaffe field cap (Einheitsfliegermütze) comes in blue-grey fabric with silver piping on the crown for officers without insignia. The Luftwaffe peak cap is made in dark blue-grey fabric with a black ribbed band and a black patent leather peak. The Luftwaffe peak cap crown and band edge are piped in silver with double silver cap-cords, it comes with silver bullion embroidered Luftwaffe eagle supported by two stylized wings with cockade in the center.

=== Officers’ uniform ===
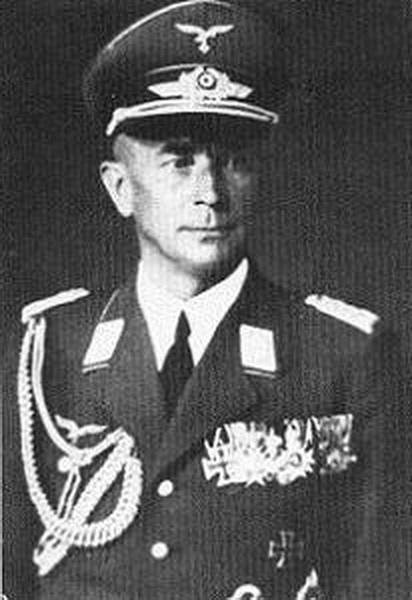
Hilmer Freiherr von Bülow wearing schirmmütze and blue dress uniform with yellow collar litzen, and peaked cap

Officers’ uniforms had an embroidered Luftwaffe eagle over the wearer's right breast pocket. Headgear saw further use of the aluminium coiled wire in the embroidered cockades, oak leaves, wings, chin cords and a smaller Luftwaffe eagle together with aluminium effect piping. Collars were edged in twisted aluminium cording and the four patch pocket tunics had aluminium pebbled buttons.

=== Service dress uniform ===
The Luftwaffe uniform Fliegerbluse is made in blue-grey wool and is hip length. All three models of Luftwaffe Fliegerbluse are fly-fronted with no visible buttons. The German Luftwaffe Tuchrock tunic has a falling collar with deep lapels and five buttons. The Luftwaffe uniform Tuchrock has four pleated pockets with square flaps.

==== Luftwaffe jackets ====
The Luftwaffe Leather Pilots’ Jacket were made in black or dark brown very thin split cowhide. The jacket is waist length with zip front. It has two zip chest pockets and two pockets under the ribs with pointed flap closure. The jacket features and standard tailored collar. Luftwaffe produced greatcoats made from heavy blue-grey wool fabric. It is double-breasted, has two rows of six metal buttons and reaches to mid-calf. There is a cloth half-belt with two buttons in the rear of the waist, and a central rear vent hidden in an inverted pleat which reaches from the hem to the waist. It has two slanted slash pockets just below the waist with rounded flaps.

==== Black Panzer jacket ====
The Luftwaffe style black Panzer jacket was identical in style to that of the Army and was drawn from Army stocks. It was manufactured with black wool and was double-breasted, short waisted and with a large collar with pointed lapels. The wrap of the double-breasted front was nearly all the way across and then angled back down to the waist. The insignia consisted of the Luftwaffe national emblem, first on the blue-gray wool backing and later in a matching black backing. These were machine-woven or embroidered in white thread.

=== Fallschirmjäger ===
The Luftwaffe produced a camouflage jacket as a consequence of the heavy casualties inflicted on German armed forces in Russia. As the Luftwaffe Fallschirmjäger jump smock was too overpriced to produce in the quantities required, a simplified camouflage over-jacket was put into production and became the signature of the Luftwaffe infantry. When made, the only insignia printed to the jacket was the standard Luftwaffe eagle and swastika emblem, on the other hand, rank insignia, in the form of conventional epaulettes, was added and even some metal combat awards and cuff titles are known to have been worn. Luftwaffe Field Divisions were deployed in the East, Italy and the Western Front. It is a three-quarter length lightweight single-breasted camouflage jacket with stand and fall collar and two flapped lower pockets.

==== Knochensack ====
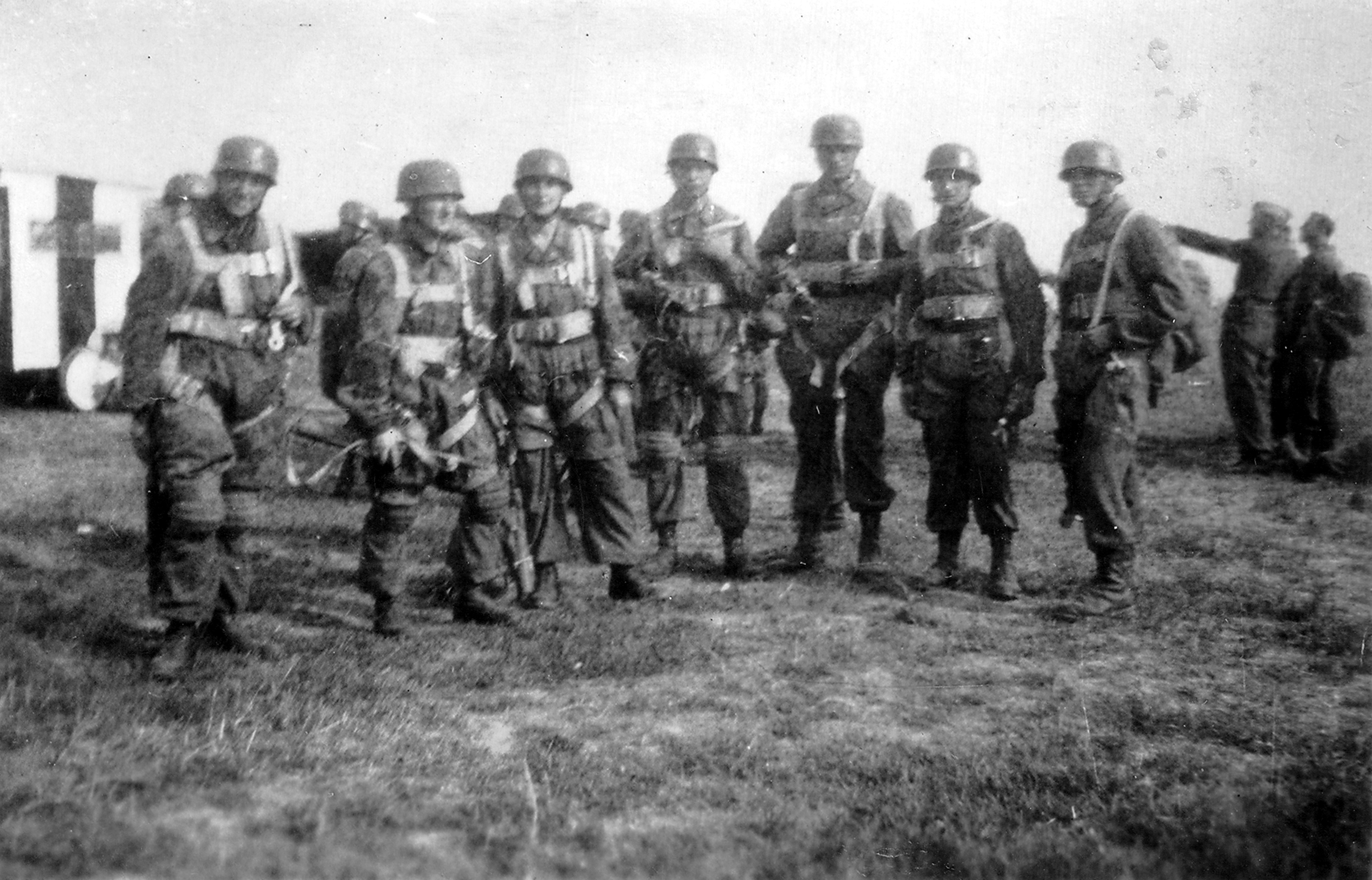
Fallschirmjäger (Wehrmacht)

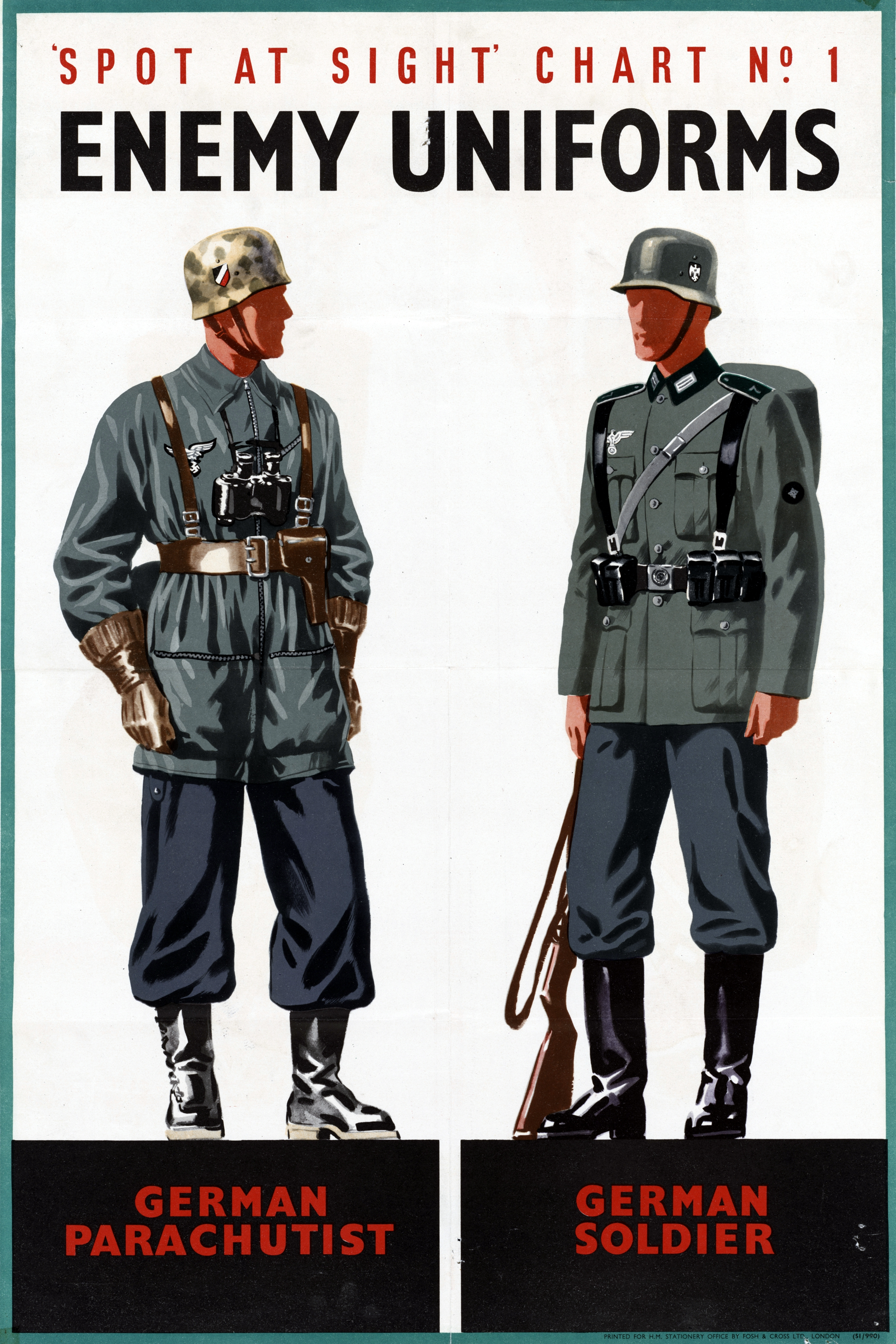
British WW2 poster ca 1942 showing "Enemy Uniforms; German Parachutist; German Soldier".

Knochensack (bonesack) was the nickname for German parachute jump smocks designed to be worn over a paratrooper's equipment made for the Luftwaffe Fallschirmjäger during World War II. They were made in a variety of camouflage patterns and from tough cotton material.

There were several models in use in 1936, when the German paratroops were still part of the German army. The first pattern used by the German air force (in 1938) was manufactured in a plain green pattern. The cotton fabric used was a mix of green fibres with a few orange fibres intermixed. It had a front zipper opening but did not open fully, and had to be stepped into much like coveralls. The use of zippers in (military) dress was still something of a novelty.

The earlier models had no pockets. Over time first one, two, and then four pockets were added, with some having a flare pistol holster at the rear.

By 1943–1944 the Knochensack was modified to include a fully opening front and no longer had to be stepped into. After ca. 1942 the fabric used was camouflage-printed. The German Knochensack formed the basis for the British paratroop jacket that was developed into the Denison smock and the jump smock used by the USMC Parachute Battalions in the Pacific Theater.

=== Luftwaffe Medical Corps ===
The Medical Branch of the Luftwaffe was one of the original career fields present when the Luftwaffe came out into the open in March 1935. The standard Waffenfarbe for the Luftwaffe Medical branch was cornflower blue. When attached to the Hermann Göring Division and the Luftwaffe Field Division, the solid blue collar tabs and shoulder boards were to be retained.

=== Luftwaffe uniforms in the Afrikakorps ===
The cuff title was introduced on March 6, 1942, and was carried by units or formations the Luftwaffe that were stationed in Africa. It was carried 16 cm above the end of the right sleeve.

== Luftwaffe officers’ sword and dagger etc. ==
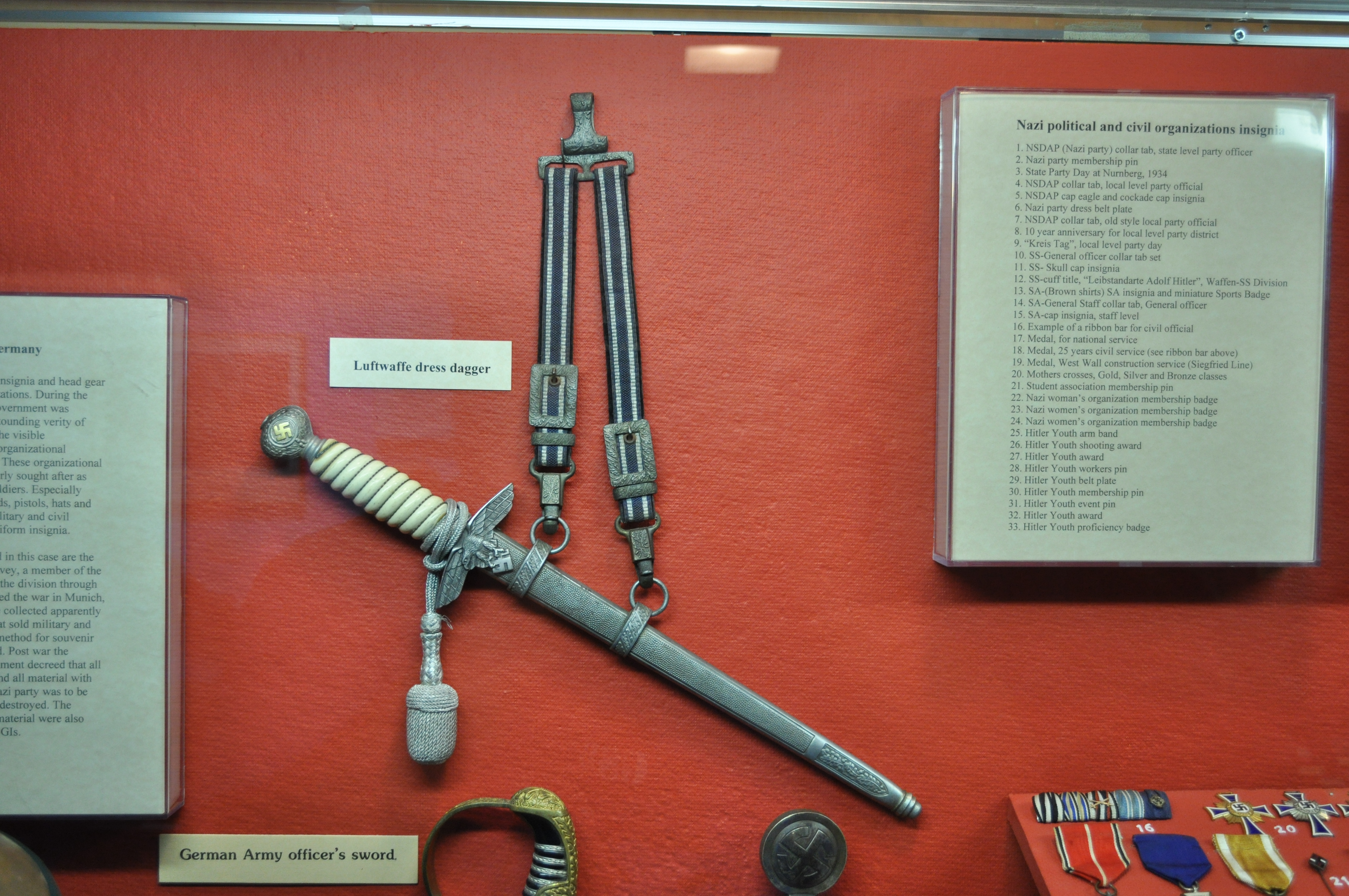
Luftwaffe dress dagger, in the Fort Lewis Military Museum, Fort Lewis, Washington, USA.

=== Edged weapons ===
Luftwaffe Edged Weapons included 1st and 2nd Model daggers, Paratrooper Gravity knives, swords and bayonets. The Luftwaffe Officers’ 2nd Pattern dagger made by Eickhorn, Solingen. The second model of Luftwaffe dagger was adopted for wear by officers and certain high-ranking NCOs in 1937.

=== Gravity knife "Fallschirmjäger-Messer" ===
The Paratrooper Gravity Knife is a knife with a blade contained in its handle, made by Paul Weysersberg, Solingen, and which opens its blade by the force of inertia or gravity. The main purpose of this opening method is that it allows opening and closing to be done one handed, in situations where the other hand is occupied. A major historical use has been in issue to parachutists to cut off their parachutes when tangled in a tree or similar. The gravity knife uses a button, trigger, or fulcrum lever to release the blade from both the open and the closed positions, and may use a side-folding or telescoping mechanism. While most military gravity knives utilize a locking blade design, other types may not mechanically lock open but rely instead upon friction to wedge the rear section of the blade against the interior of the handle. Factory-made gravity knives have various types of buttons, triggers, and fulcrum levers, which usually are used to release the blade from both the open and the closed positions.

=== Luftwaffe pilot wristwatches ===
The use of wristwatches by Luftwaffe pilots became very widespread as accurate timings were required to assist them in their mission.

The Hanhart Chronograph was a one-button watch made by Swiss-German manufacturer Hanhart. The one-button version was a simplified design that first appeared in 1942 and was the version worn by the Luftwaffe's aces like Major Erich Hartmann. The watch is a 17-jewel mechanical movement and only 2500 units were produced. The Tutima Flieger Chronograph watch was a high quality chronograph wrist watch that was developed in 1939. However it was not until 1941 that the watch was available for sale either individually to pilots or to the German Air Ministry, and then supplied to the German Luftwaffe. The Lange und Söhne Luftwaffe Observers’ Watch was used in aircraft which required a highly reliable and easily readable timepiece. From approximately 1941, a standardised design was manufactured. These watches were very large even by today's standard. A large navigation mechanical watch, the Laco Aviator for German Pilots was used in military Luftwaffe Pilots. The hours markers and watch hands are fluorescent. The Reichs Air Ministry recognized the need for an efficient observer watch – Beobachtungsuhr in German, also shortened B-Uhren or B-Uhr – to be used by the aircraft navigator, assisting crews of long range bombing missions. Observers’ Watches were also worn by the pilots who needed wrist watches that could be accurately and instantly read when both hands were used to pilot the aircraft. This design was given the Reichsluftfahrtministerium classification number FL 23883 (RLM FL 23883). This number appeared on all Luftwaffe watches of this design. Laco also produced a compass which would have been worn by the pilot on his other arm.

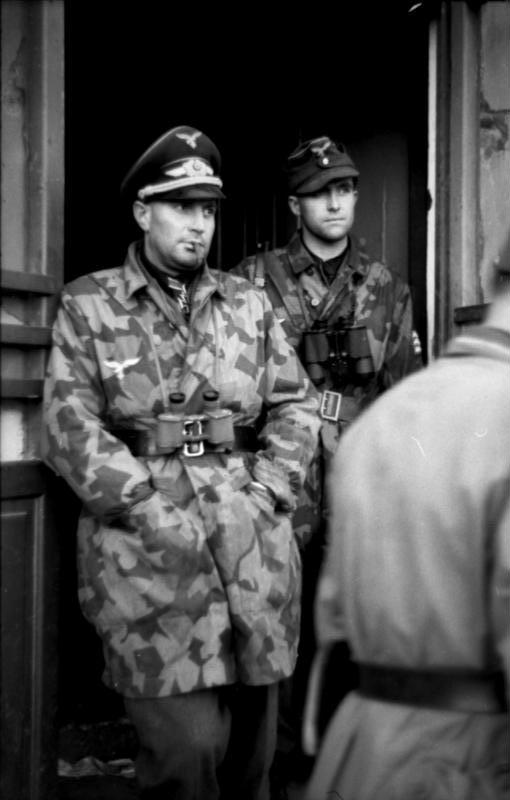
Battalion commander of the Fallschirmjäger, Walter Gericke wears Camouflage Jacket, M1942

== See also ==
- Ranks and insignia of the Luftwaffe (1935–1945)
- List of flags of Luftwaffe (1933–1945)
