= Mao suit =

Type of Chinese clothing

Chinese tunic suit ("Zhongshan"/"Mao suit")

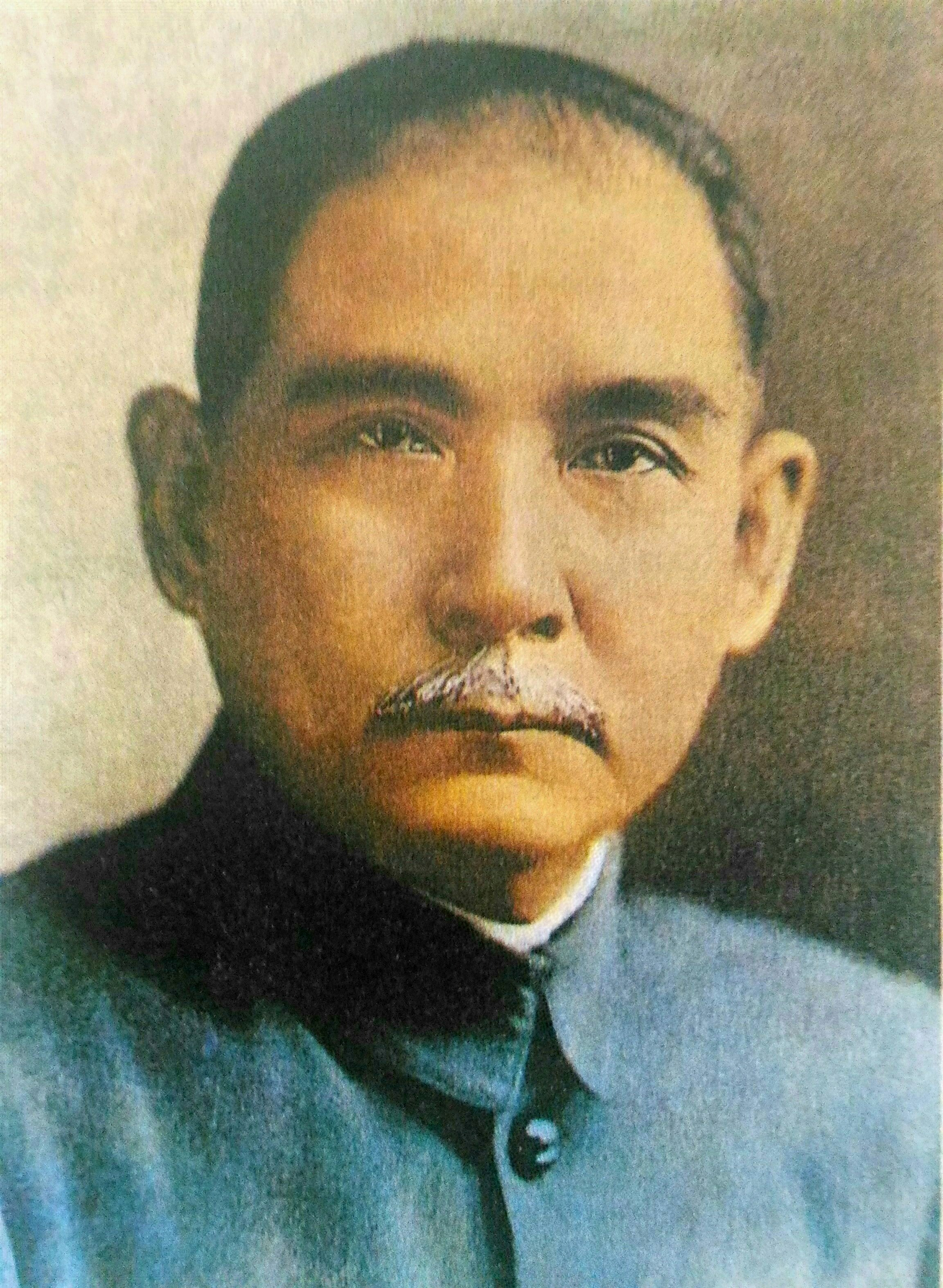
Sun Yat-sen

The Chinese tunic suit is a style of male attire originally known in China as the Zhongshan suit or Sun Yat-sen suit (simplified Chinese: 中山装; traditional Chinese: 中山裝; pinyin: Zhōngshān zhuāng) after the republican leader Sun Yat-sen (Sun Zhongshan). Sun Yat-sen introduced the style shortly after the founding of the Republic of China (1912–1949) as a form of national dress with distinct political overtones. The four pockets are said to represent the Four Virtues of propriety, justice, honesty, and humility; and the five buttons the Five Yuans of the Government of the Republic of China (Executive, Legislative, Judicial, Examination, Control).

The suits came to be widely worn by male citizens and government leaders after the Communist victory in the Chinese Civil War, and the establishment of the People's Republic of China in 1949. It served as a symbol of proletarian unity, and an Eastern counterpart to the Western business suit. The name "Mao suit" or "Mao tunic" comes from Chairman of the Chinese Communist Party Mao Zedong's fondness for the style. The garment became closely associated with him and Chinese Communism. Mao's cut of the suit was influenced by the Stalin tunic, which was prevalent among Soviet officials at the time. Increasing use of the Western business suit by the general public in the 1980s and 1990s led to a decline in use of the Mao suit. However, it is still frequently worn by Chinese leaders during important state ceremonies and functions. The Mao suit was also worn in North Korea by party elites.

The style became fashionable among Western European, Australian, and New Zealander socialists and intellectuals in the 1960s and 1970s.

== Origins ==
When the Republic was founded in 1912, the style of dress worn in China was based on Manchu dress (qipao and changshan), which had been imposed by the Qing dynasty as a form of social control. The majority-Han Chinese revolutionaries who overthrew the Qing were fueled by the failure of the Qing to defend China and a lack of scientific advancement compared to foreign colonial powers. Even before the founding of the Republic, older forms of Chinese dress were becoming unpopular among the elite and led to the development of Chinese dress which combined the changshan and the European suit to form a new dress. The Zhongshan suit is a parallel development that combined European-inspired Chinese fashion.

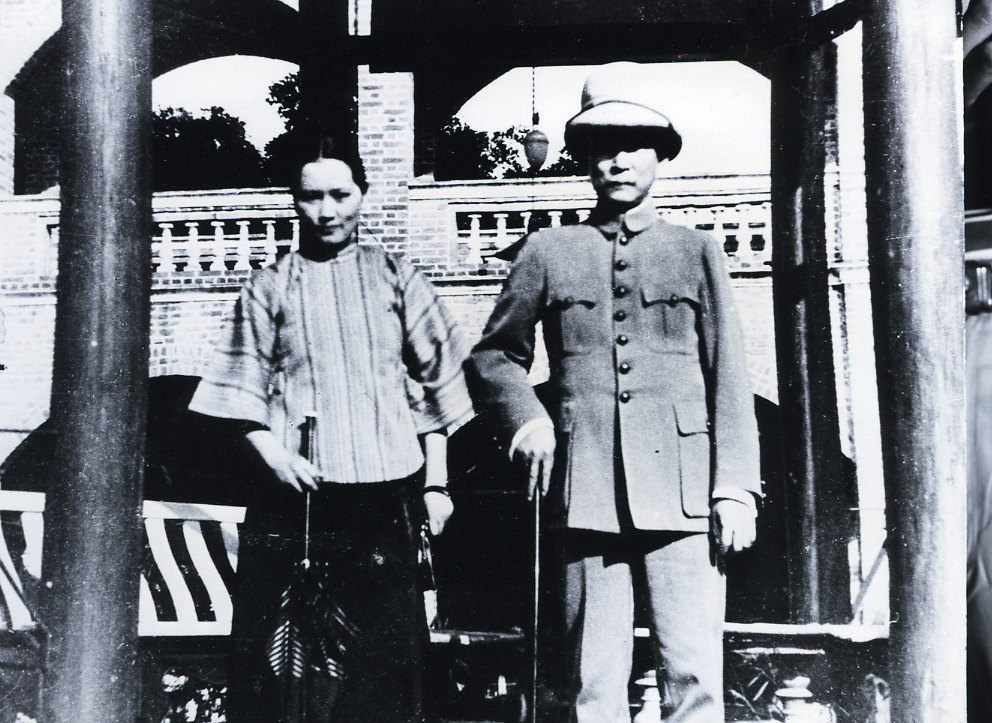
Sun wearing one early version of the suit, with seven buttons instead of five

Chinese schools began adopting high-collared Western and European military tunics, with three pockets and five buttons in the early 1900s, which is an early version of the Zhongshan suit. With the increased militarisation of Qing China, military-style clothing increased in popularity. As early as 1905, in the aftermath of the Russo-Japanese War, Sun Yat-sen had a Yokohama tailor shop design a coat based on a Japanese uniform (which was based on the Prussian Waffenrock), likely the plain military-style jacket that he was photographed wearing circa 1912 which was arguably the forebear of the Zhongshan suit. By 1914, Sun had been photographed wearing another military-style tunic that was recognisably the Zhongshan suit except with seven buttons instead of five, and the next year, had a Nanjing tailor shop alter another uniform into a tunic. By the time of Sun's death in 1925, the name of the Zhongshan suit became frequently mentioned in writing such as in tailor's advertising or newspapers. In 1925, boycotts of foreign businesses in the May 30th Movement led to widespread calls for citizens to adopt the "Zhongshan suit", explicitly "imitating the short coat that Mr. Zhongshan wore." By 1929, the new Chinese Nationalist government had designated the Zhongshan suit as the regulation dress of government officials. Later designs bear stronger resemblance to the French tunic and the later Stalin tunic.

== Historical development ==
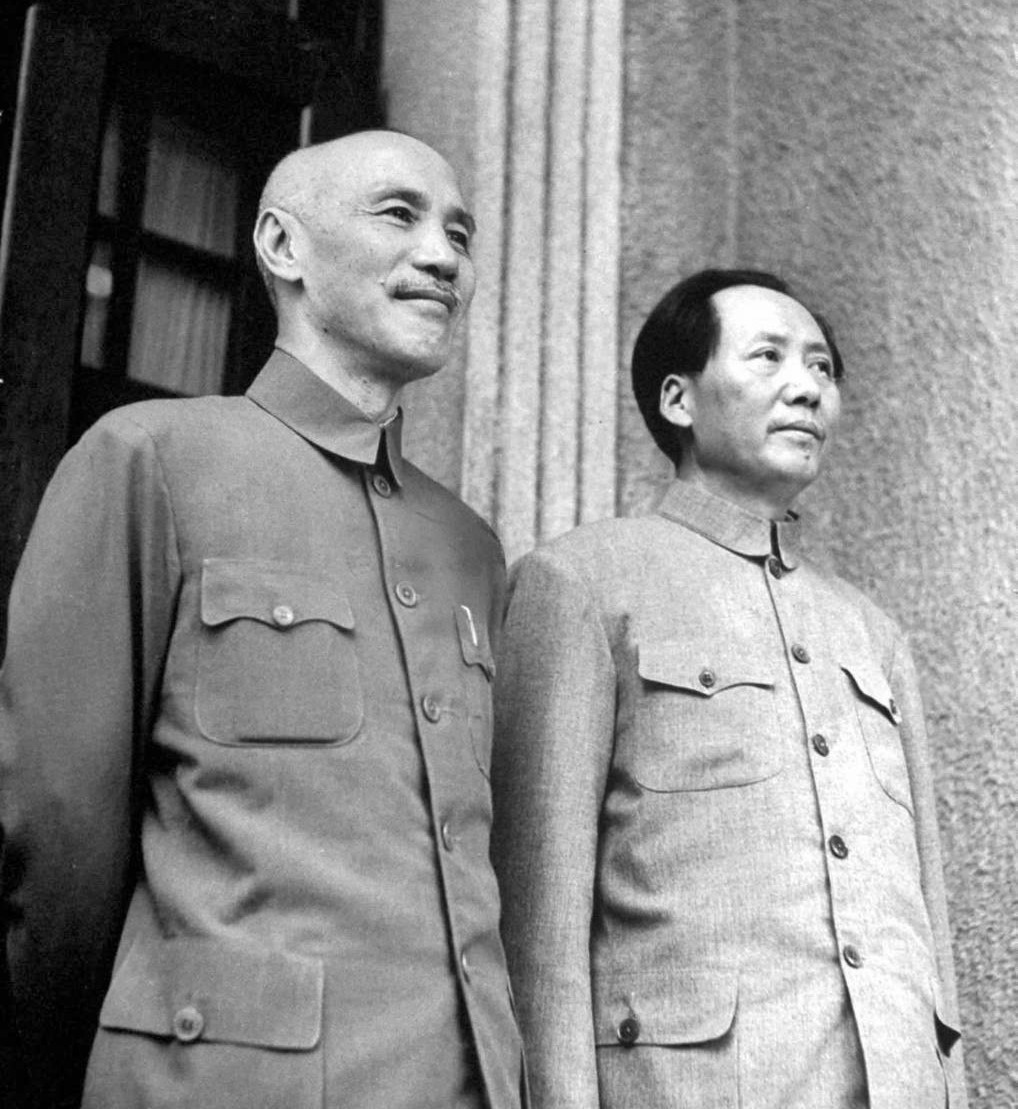
Chiang Kai-shek and Mao Zedong both wearing Zhongshan suits in Chongqing, 1945

The Mao suit remained the standard formal dress for the first and second generations of PRC leaders such as Deng Xiaoping. During the 1990s, it began to be worn with decreasing frequency by leaders of CCP General Secretary Jiang Zemin's generation as more and more Chinese politicians began wearing traditional European-style suits with neckties. Jiang wore it only on special occasions, such as state dinners. General Secretary Hu Jintao still wore the Mao suit on special occasions, such as the ceremony marking the 60th anniversary of the People's Republic in 2009. Hu Jintao appeared at a black tie state dinner in the United States wearing a business suit, attracting some criticism for being underdressed at a formal occasion. In the general secretaryship of Xi Jinping the Mao suit made a comeback as a diplomatic uniform and evening dress.

== Symbol of national sovereignty ==
The Mao suit is worn at the most formal ceremonies as a symbol of national sovereignty. China's paramount leaders always wear Mao suits for military parades in Beijing, even though other CCP Politburo Standing Committee members and other CCP Politburo officials wear European business suits. It is customary for Chinese leaders to wear Mao suits when attending state dinners. In this situation, the Mao suit serves as a form of evening dress, equivalent to a military uniform for a monarch, or a tuxedo for a paramount leader.

The Mao suit also serves as a diplomatic uniform. Although Chinese ambassadors usually wear European business suits, many Chinese ambassadors choose to wear a Mao suit when they present their credentials to the head of state. The presentation ceremony is symbolic of the diplomatic recognition that exists between the two countries, so it carries a higher level of formality than other diplomatic meetings.

== See also ==
- Abacost
- Barong tagalog
- Chinese clothing
- Nehru jacket
- Feldbluse
- French (tunic)
- Gakuran
- Jodhpuri
- Kariba suit
- Madiba shirt
- Mandarin collar
- Safari jacket
- Stalin tunic
- Waffenrock
