= Stalin tunic =

Type of tunic or jacket

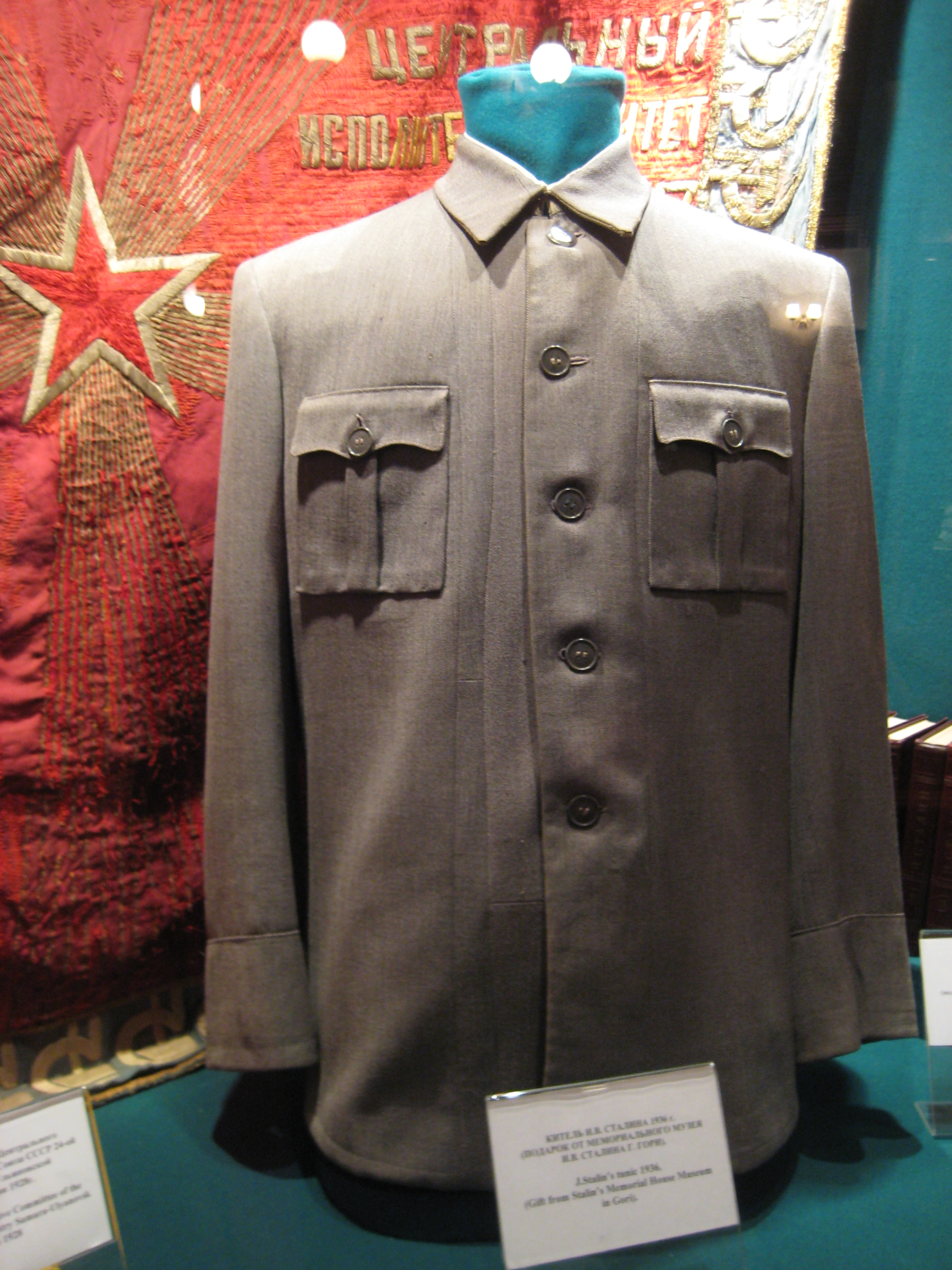
Joseph Stalin's tunic on display at his bunker in Izmaylovo District, Moscow.

The Stalin tunic (Russian: сталинка, romanized: stalinka [ˈstalʲɪnkə]) is a colloquial term for a type of tunic or jacket associated with Joseph Stalin; from the 1920s until the 1950s and beyond, it was commonly worn as a political uniform by government officials in the Soviet Union (and, after World War II, by officials in the Soviet satellite states as well).

== History ==
Stalinka evolved from the french (френч), a tunic of the Imperial Russian Army, which had appeared in the First World War; the difference was that the Stalinka had a soft turn-down collar. Its simplistic style came from Stalin's refusal to wear clothing of a more complex nature, as well as eventual tweaks made by Soviet fashion designers that tried to create an image for the leader.

== Influence ==
This style of attire influenced Chinese, Vietnamese, and Korean Communist leaders, known as the Mao suit.

== See also ==
- Abacost
- Barong tagalog
- Chinese clothing
- Nehru jacket
- Feldbluse
- French (tunic)
- Gakuran
- Jodhpuri
- Kariba suit
- Madiba shirt
- Mandarin collar
- Safari jacket
- Waffenrock
