= Stalinka (disambiguation) =

Stalinka may refer to:

- Stalinka, a type of postconstructivist building characteristic of Stalinist architecture
- Stalin tunic, a jacket popularized by Joseph Stalin
- Stalinka, an old name of Demiivka neighborhood in Kyiv
