= Abacost =

Clothing style from Zaire

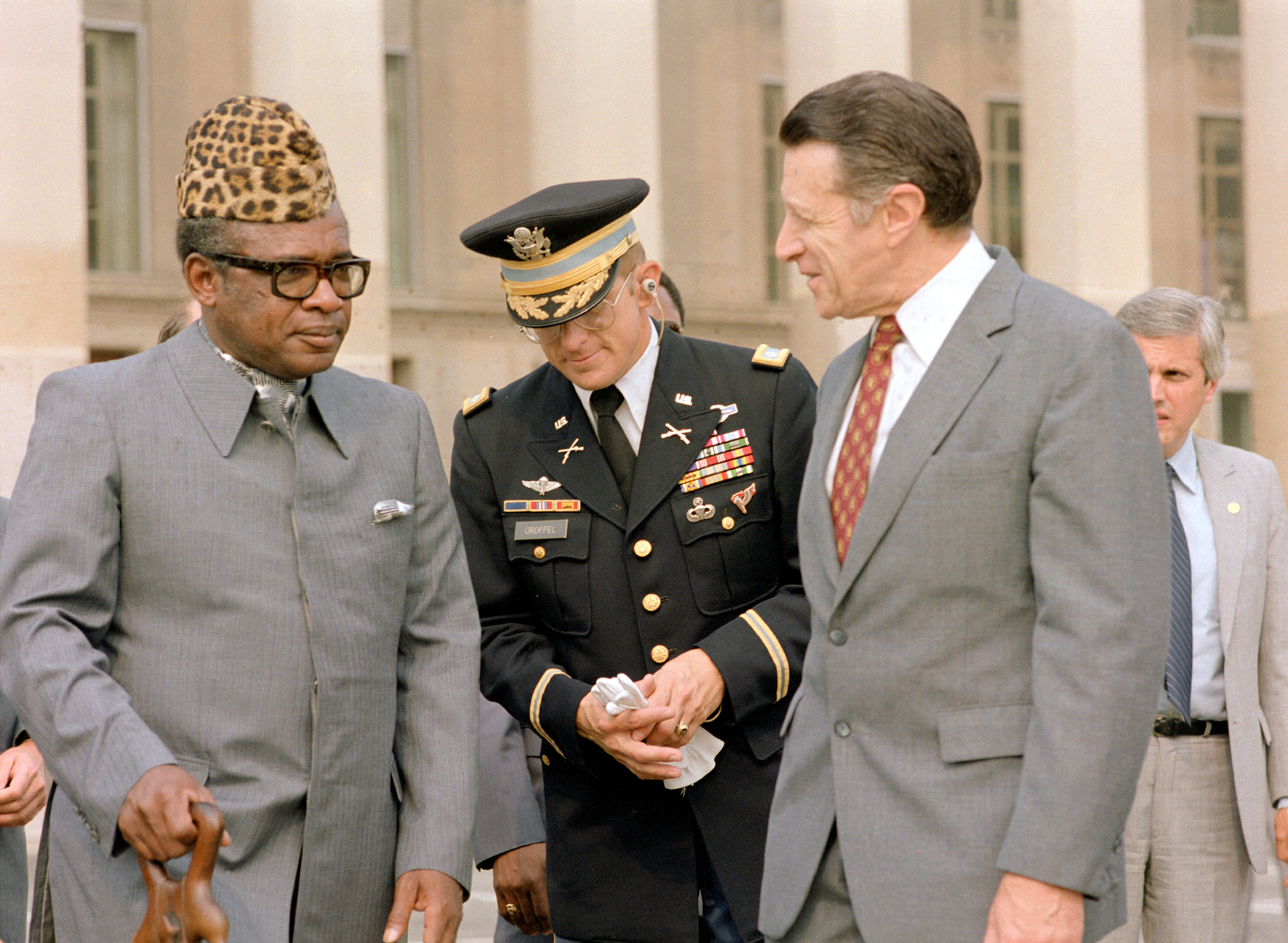
Mobutu (left), wearing a long-sleeved abacost and "Mobutu Hat" with Caspar W. Weinberger (right), wearing a Western lounge suit, during a state visit to the United States in 1983

The abacost, a blending of the French "à bas le costume" (lit. 'down with the suit'), was the distinctive clothing for men that was promoted by Mobutu Sese Seko as part of his authenticité programme in Zaire, between 1972 and 1990. Zairians were banned from wearing Western-style suits with shirt and tie to symbolise the break with their colonial past. The abacost was a lightweight suit, worn without a tie, though sometimes with a cravat, and may be worn with a t-shirt or a light shirt. It closely resembled a Mao suit. It was seen in long-sleeved and short-sleeved versions.

The abacost was seen as the uniform of Mobutu's supporters, especially those who had benefited from his regime. When Mobutu announced a transition to multiparty democracy in 1990, he said that the Western suit and tie would be allowed, but that he continued to favor the abacost and it would still be considered the national dress. Subsequently, when the transitional government was sworn in, all of the ministers were wearing abacosts.

Arzoni in Zellik, Belgium was a world-famous abacost maker. Alfons Mertens, employed by Arzoni, became Mobutu's personal tailor, also making uniforms for him and his entourage.

The abacost fell out of favour after Mobutu's removal from power.

== See also ==
- Kariba suit
- Mao suit
- Nehru jacket
- Madiba shirt
