= Adjustierung =

Service dress of the Austrian army

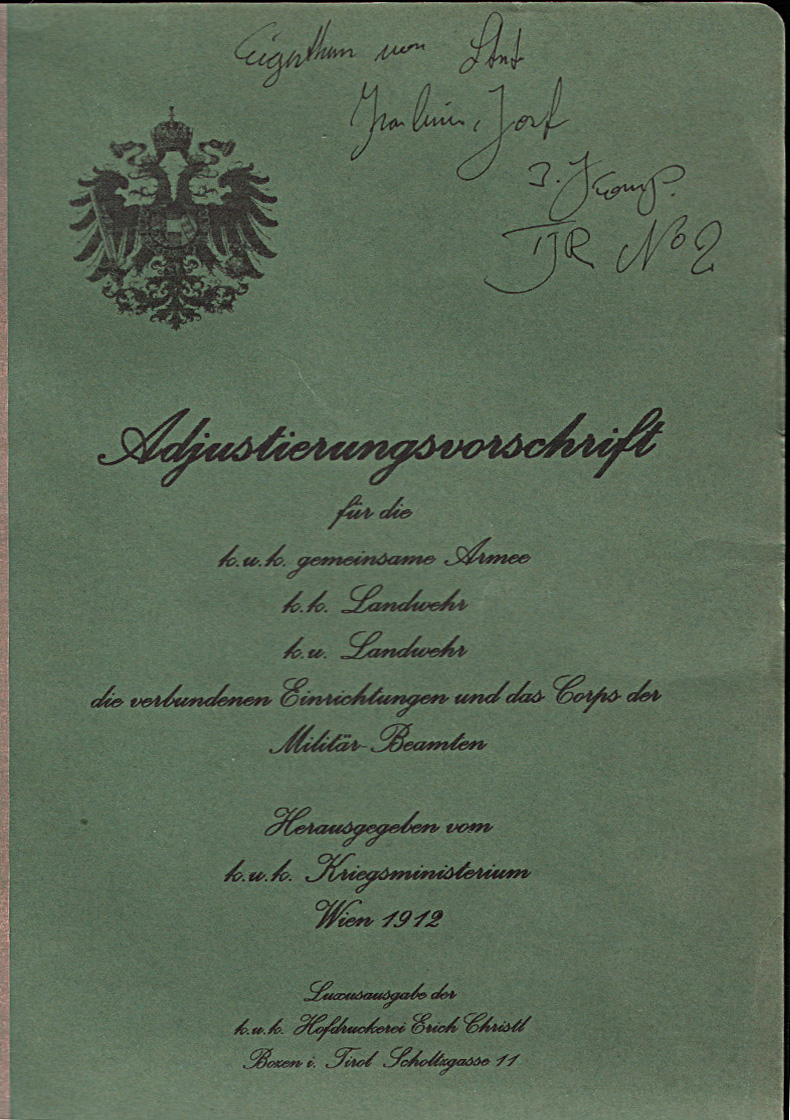
Imperial service dress (Adjustierung) guidelines (de: Adjustierungsvorschrift) 1912.

Adjustierung (literally: adjustation, Austria Dienstkleidung 'service dress') is any uniform of the Austrian armed forces. It is derived from the German (Austrian) verb adjustieren (Austria: ausrüsten, 'equip'). Another historical term used for military uniforms, e.g. in the Austro-Hungarian Army (1867–1918), was Montur, and in the Prussian Army Montierung.

Today the Austrian Armed Forces (Bundesheer) discriminates the different kinds of Adjustierung as follows:

- Paradeadjustierung ('parade adjustation')
- Marschadjustierung / Feldadjustierung ('march adjustation' / 'field adjustation')
- Gebirgsadjustierung (en: 'mountain adjustation')

In the German armed forces (Bundeswehr term is Anzugsordnung ('dress order'). Until 1945, the term Waffenrock was commonly used.

== Kinds of military adjustation ==
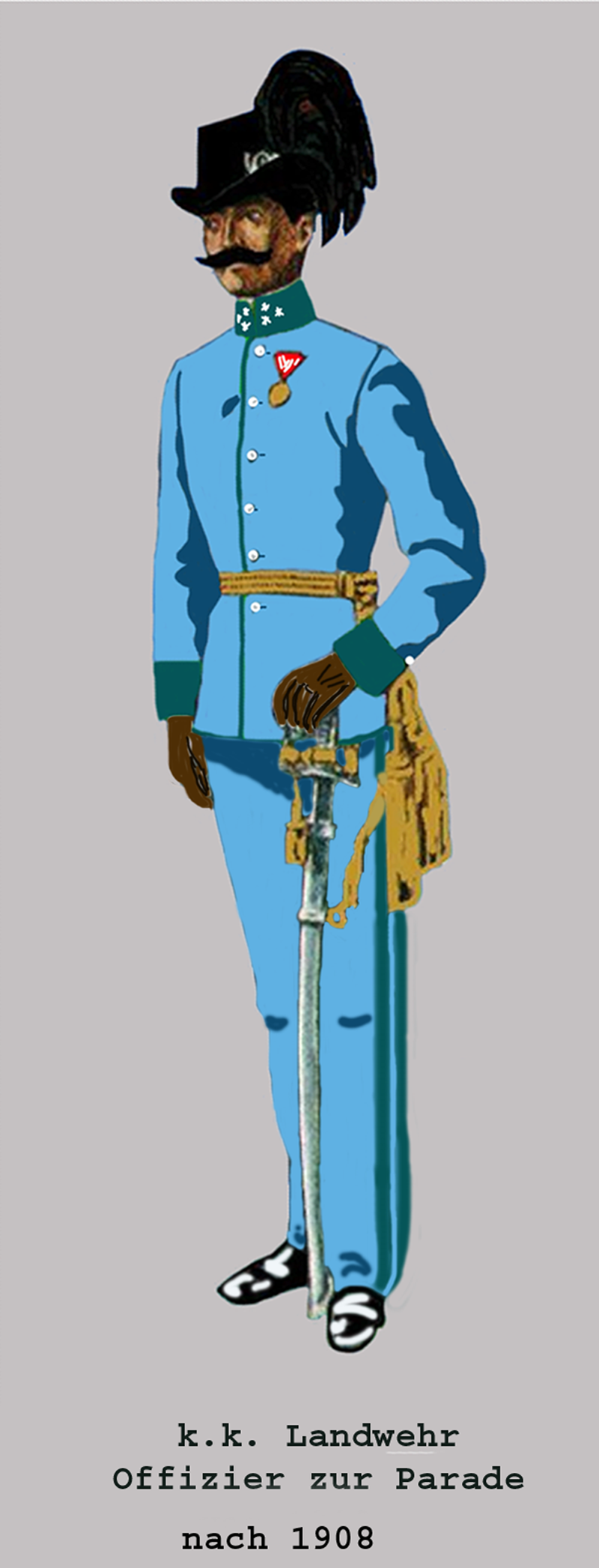
Hauptmann of the Landwehr after 1908 – parade adjustation

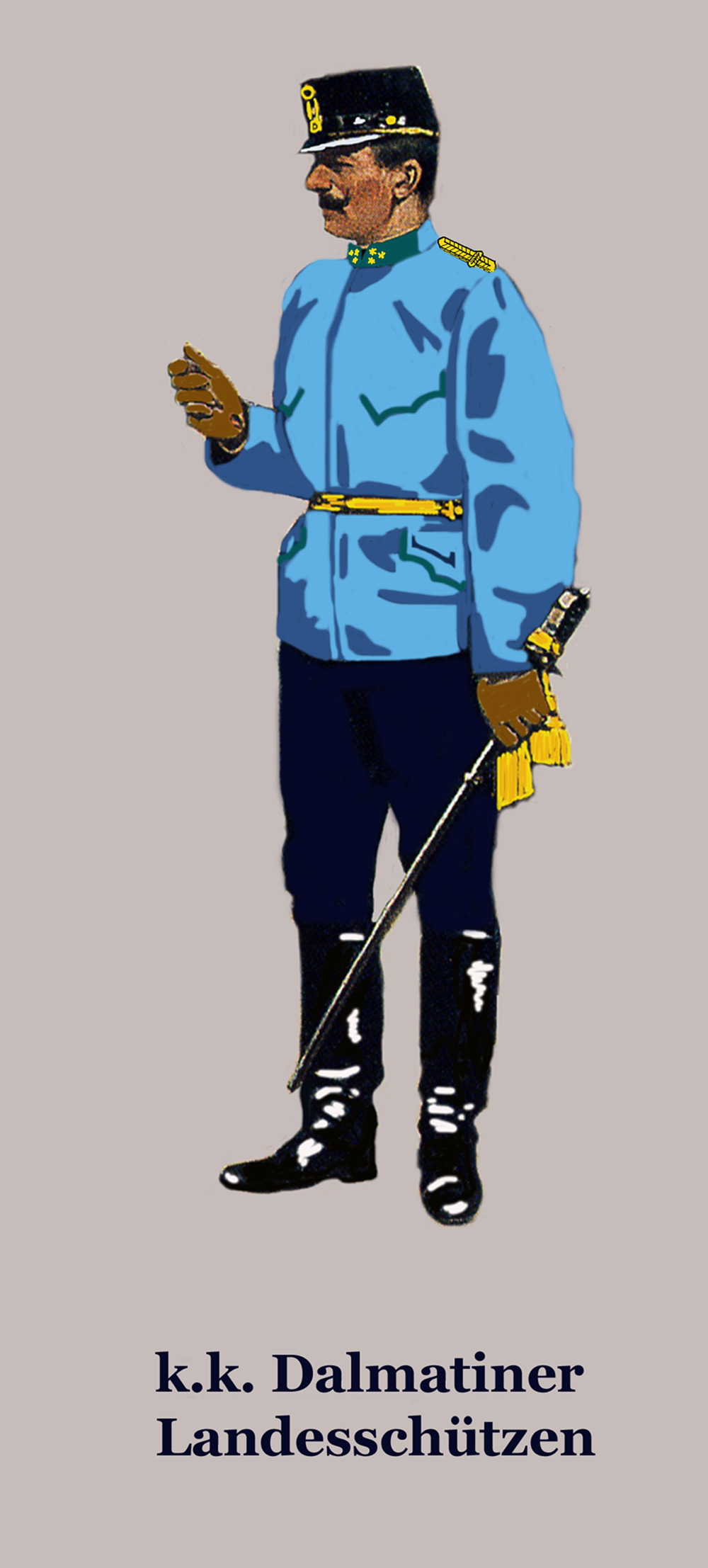
Oberleutnant of the Dalmatian Landesschützen to horse – march adjustation

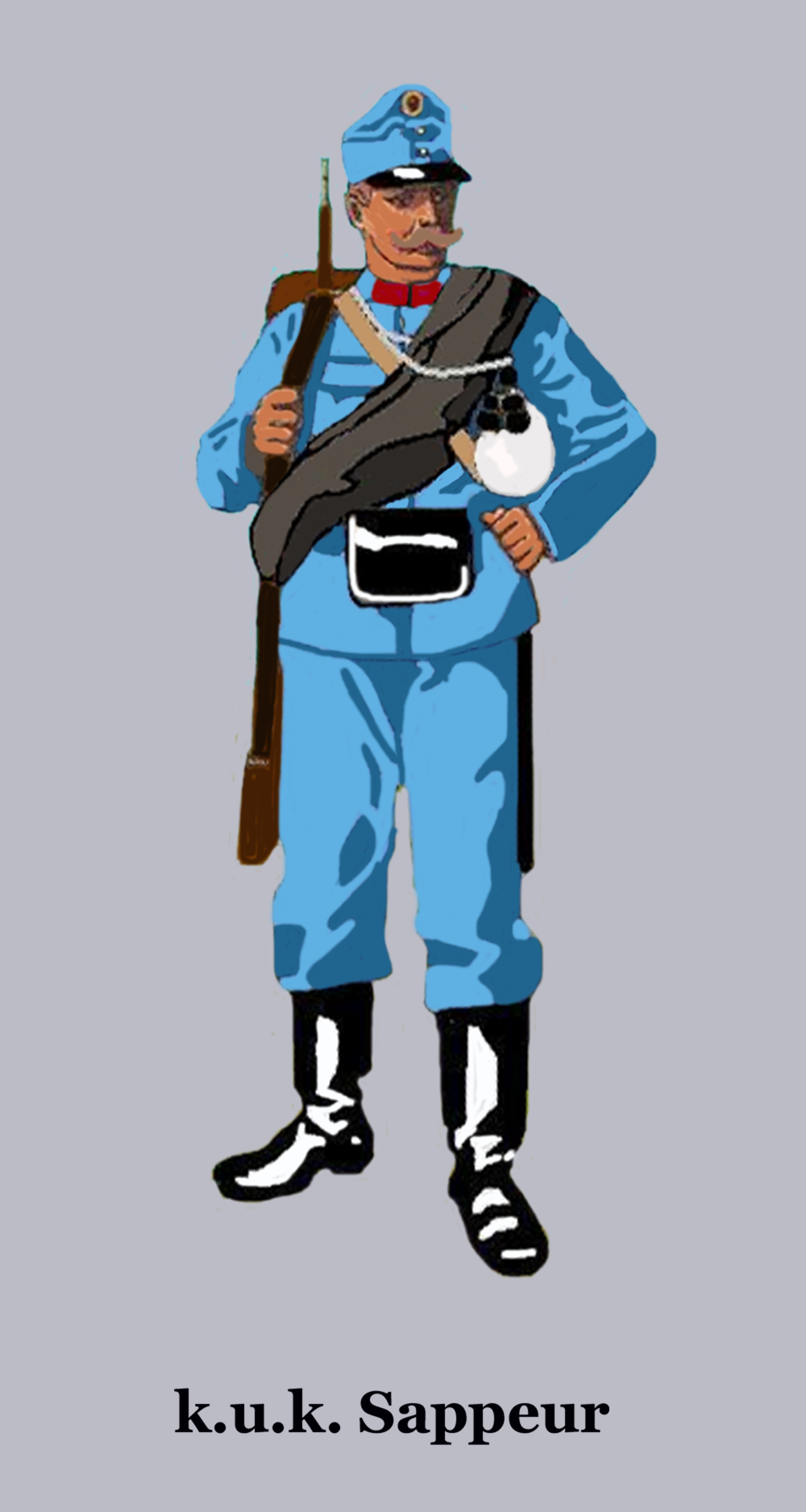
Sapper – march adjustation

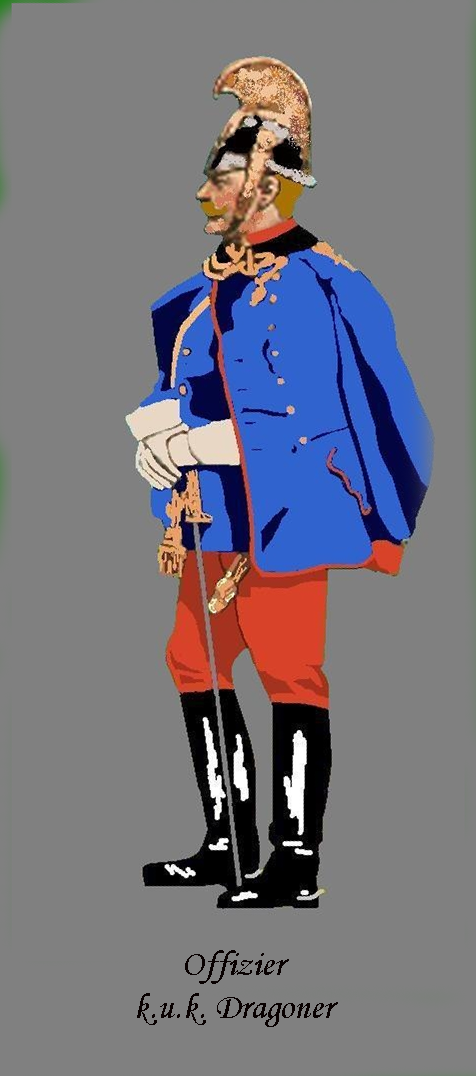
Dragoon's officer – parade adjustation

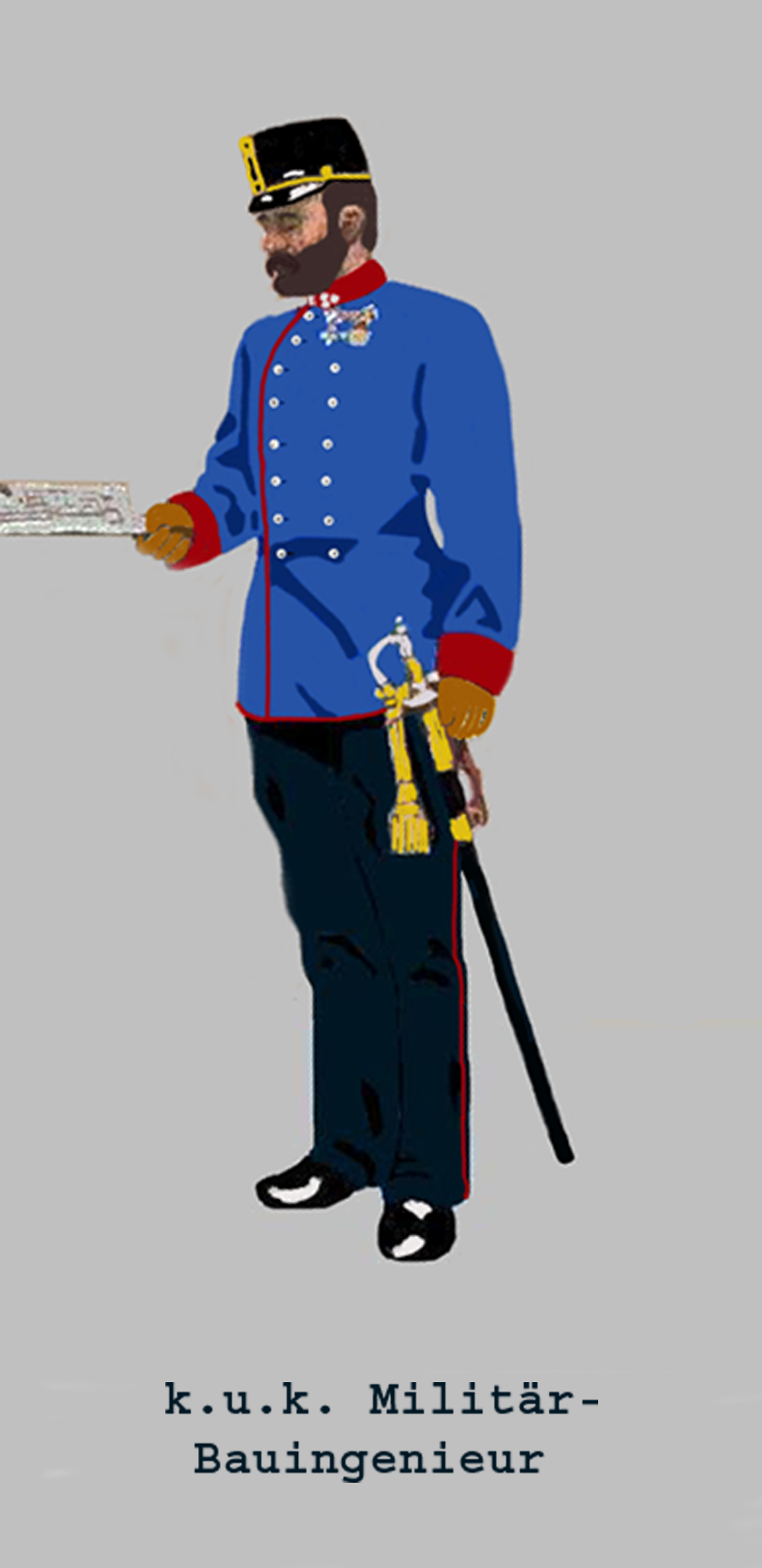
Military construction engineer – service adjustation

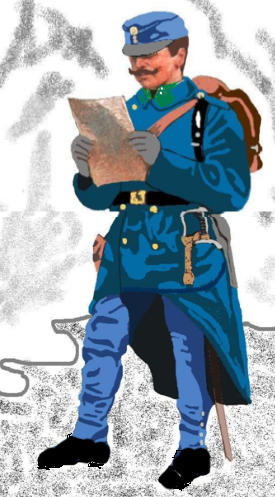
Rifleman – march adjustation winter

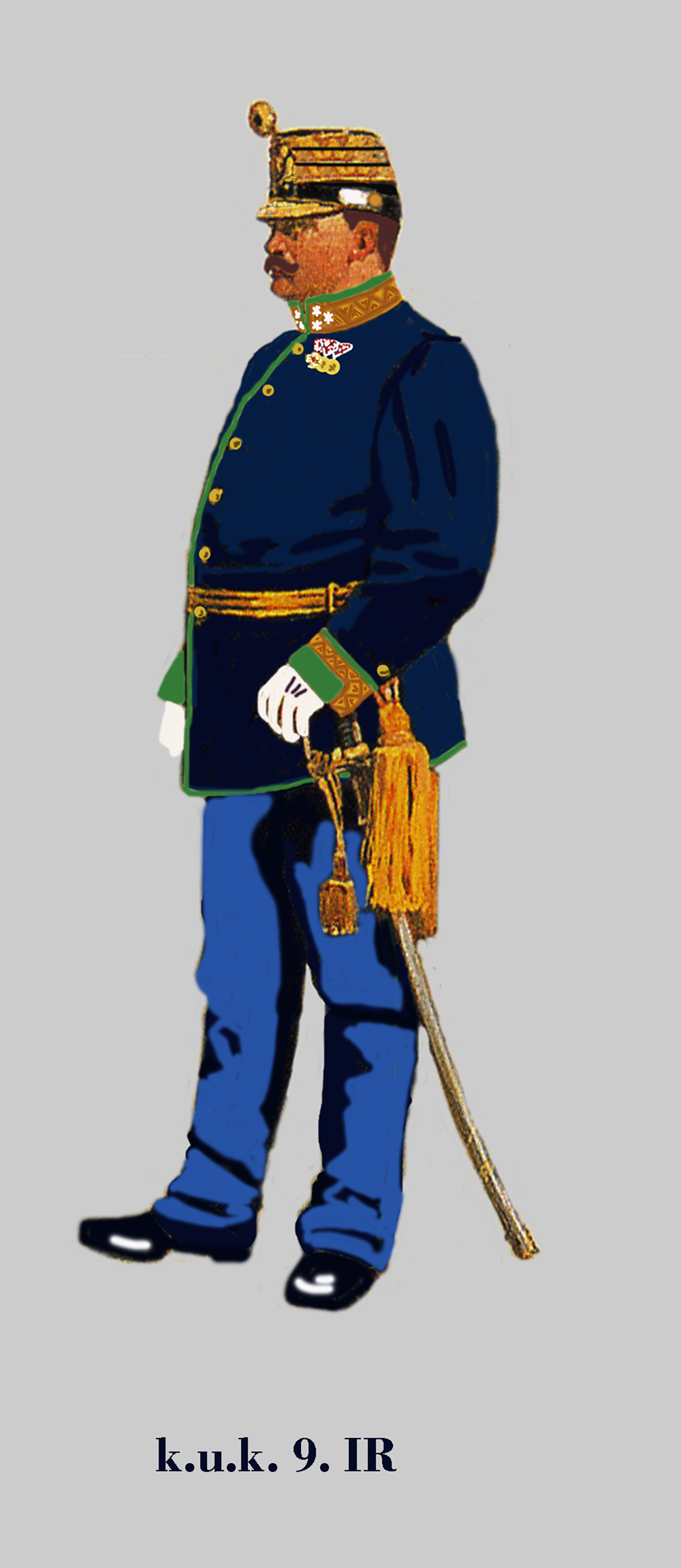
Oberst of the Cisleithenian Austro-Hungarian infantry – parade adjustation

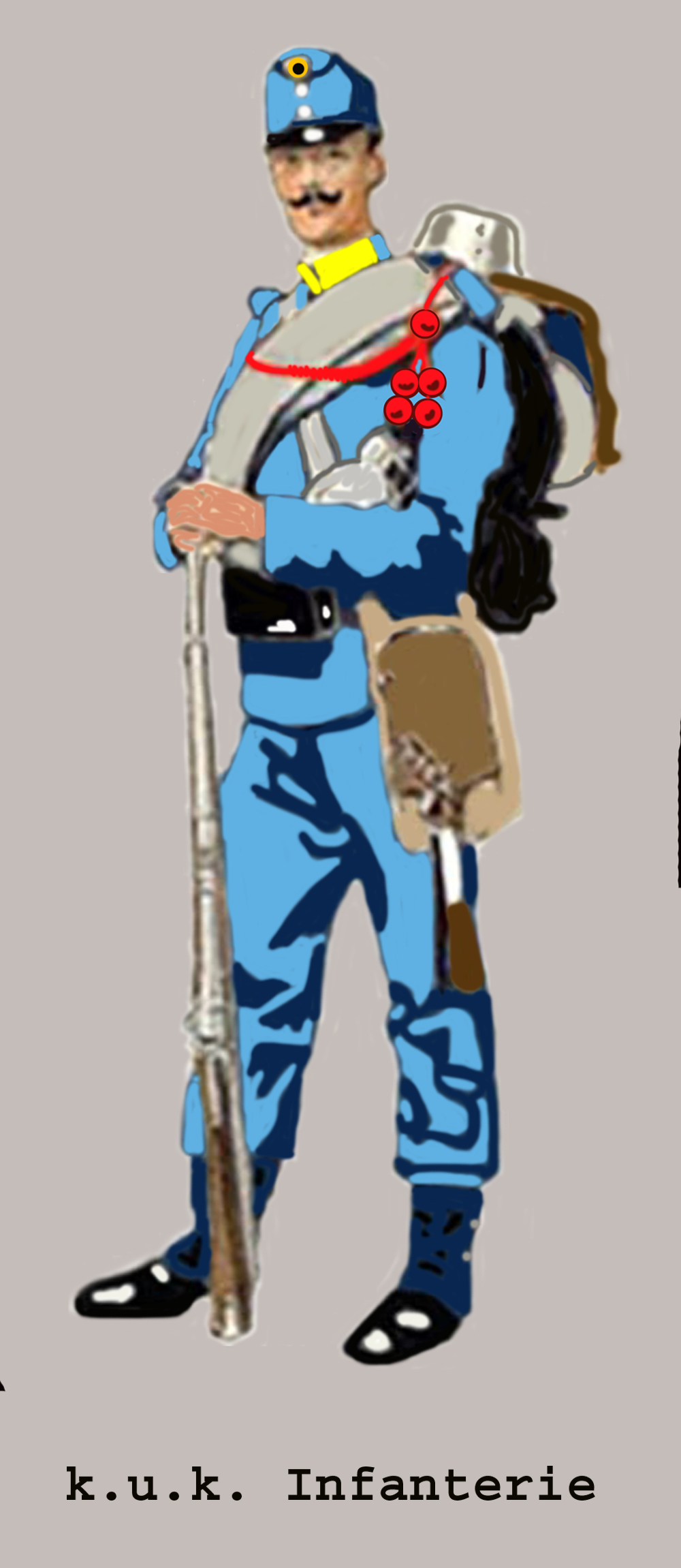
Infantryman – march adjustation

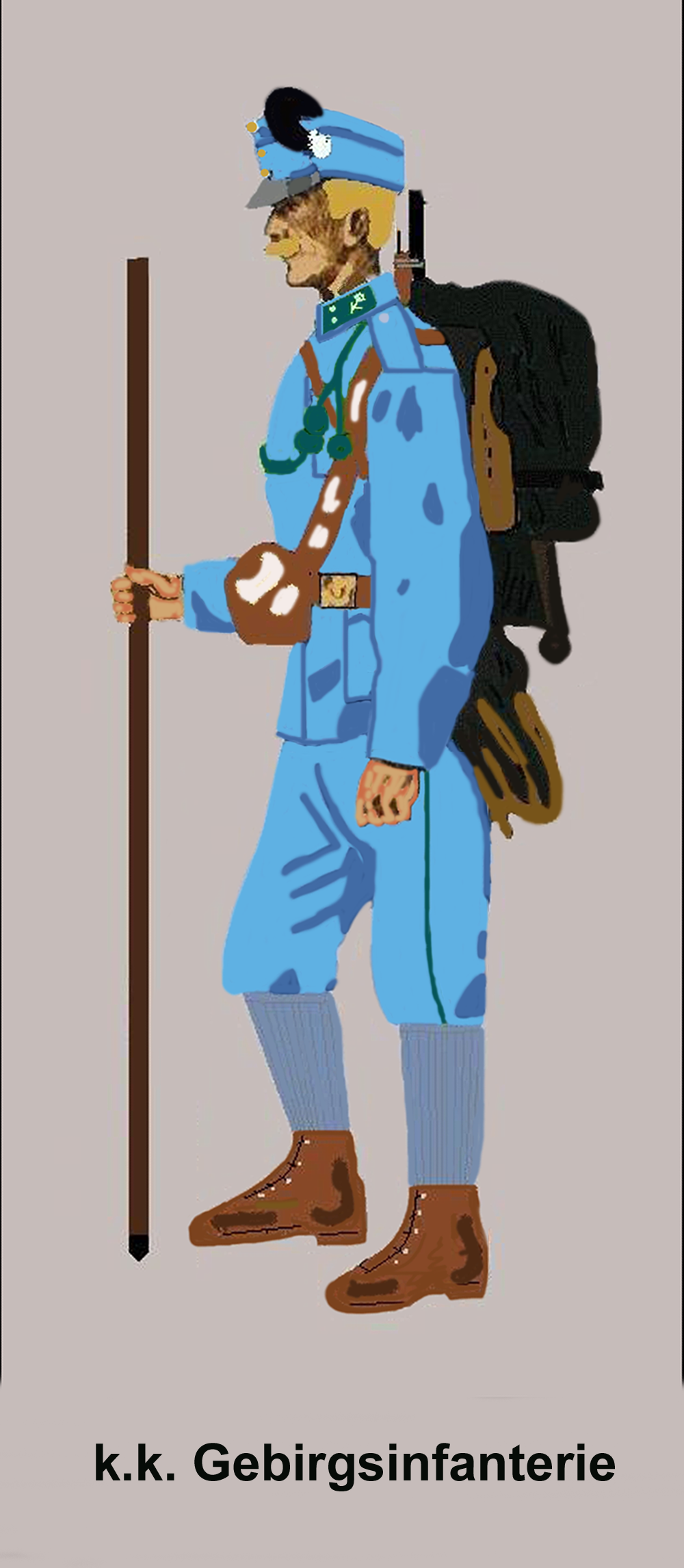
Mountain infantryman – mountain adjustation

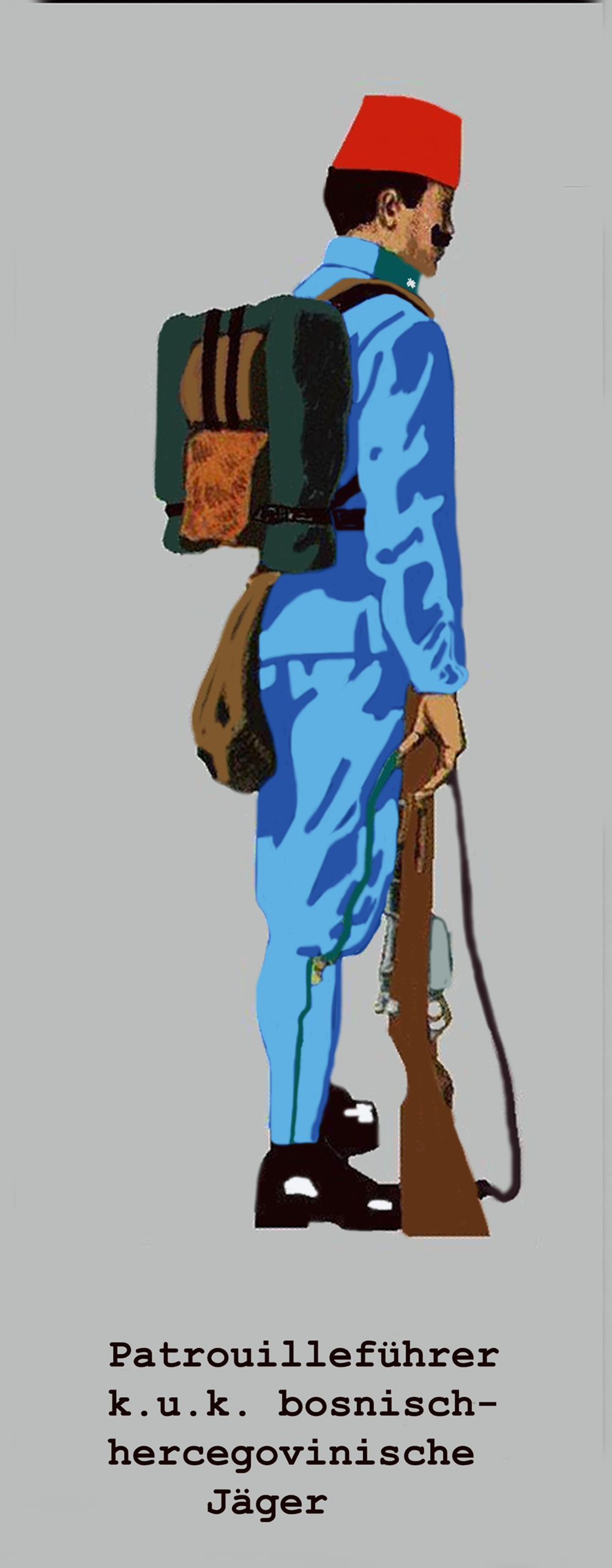
Patrolleader (Patrouilleführer) – rifles of Bosnia & Herzegovina

== See also ==
- Bundesheer
- Glossary of German military terms
- Rank insignia of the Austro-Hungarian armed forces
- Tunic (military)
- Waffenfarbe (Austria)
