= Desré Buirski =

South African fashion designer

- Born: South Africa
- Occupations: Fashion designer, entrepreneur
- Known for: Designing the Madiba shirt; founder of Presidential Shirt
- Website: presidentialshirt.com

Desré Ann Buirski is a South African fashion designer and entrepreneur best known as the creator of the Madiba shirt, the signature hand-painted batik silk shirts worn by Nelson Mandela. She is the founder of the luxury clothing brand Presidential Shirt.

== Early life and education ==
Buirski was born in South Africa. She attended Herzlia Primary School and Sans Souci Girl's High before matriculating at Progress College, now known as Rosebank Progress College, in Cape Town.

During the apartheid era, she immigrated to the United States in 1980, where she studied graphic design at Orange Coast College in California. In the early 1980s, she moved to Bali, Indonesia, where she became fluent in the local language and developed a deep expertise in traditional Batik wax-resist dyeing and silk production. In 1992, she returned to South Africa and opened her first boutique, "Bali Blue," at the V&A Waterfront in Cape Town.

== Connection with Nelson Mandela ==
On May 7, 1994, three days before Nelson Mandela's inauguration, Buirski gifted a hand-painted batik shirt—later known as the "Fish Shirt"—to Mandela's bodyguard at a Cape Town synagogue. Along with the gift, she included a note expressing her gratitude for his sacrifices for the country. Mandela wore the shirt to the dress rehearsal for the opening of Parliament the following day.

Following the public appearance, Mandela's private secretary, Mary Mxadana, requested more designs. Over the next several decades, Buirski designed and gifted more than 150 shirts to Mandela. He famously preferred the shirts over traditional Western suits, stating they gave him a "sense of freedom." Although Nelson Mandela was gifted suits by the Italian fashion designer Giorgio Armani, he preferred Buirski's shirts to suits.

== Presidential Shirt and Legacy ==
Buirski founded the brand Presidential Shirt to bring the Madiba style to a global market. The brand continues to use authentic Indonesian batik techniques combined with South African design sensibilities. Beyond Mandela, her shirts have been worn by global figures and groups such as the Ladysmith Black Mambazo, Johnny Clegg, Carlos Santana, Bruce Springsteen, Stevie Ray Vaughan, and various international heads of state.

=== Presidential Awards ===
Under Buirski's leadership, the Presidential Shirt brand established the Presidential Awards. This initiative honors 100 South Africans annually who exemplify the values of Nelson Mandela. The awards recognize "everyday heroes" who make significant impacts in social justice, community development, and humanitarianism, effectively carrying forward the legacy of "walking in Madiba's footsteps."

In 2010 Buirski published her biography that details her experiences designing and meeting Nelson Mandela.

=== Publications ===
- Mandela's Shirts and Me (2010).
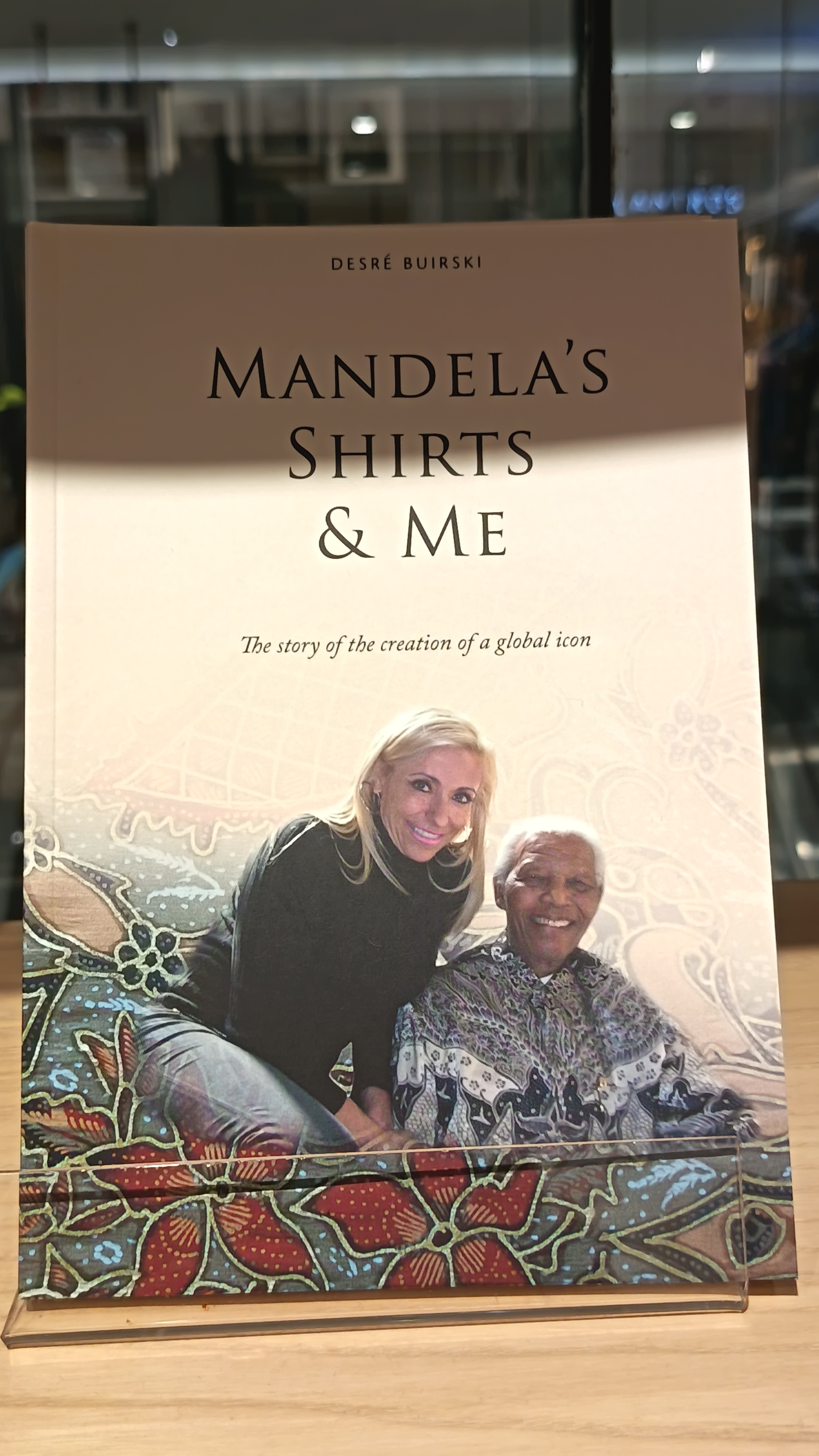
  Mandela's Shirts and Me

== See also ==
- Nelson Mandela
- Madiba Shirt
