= Tunic (military) =

Type of coat or jacket

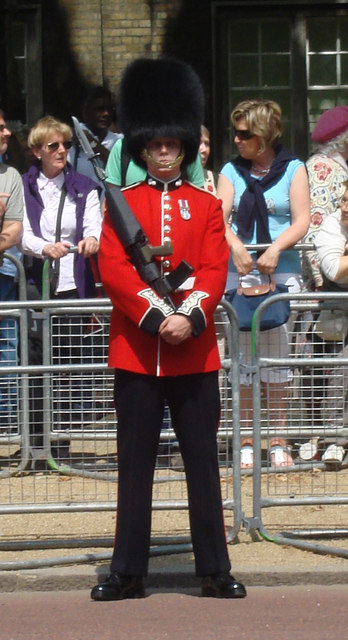
A soldier of the Grenadier Guards wearing a ceremonial tunic in 2009.

A military tunic is a type of medium length coat or jacket, the lower hem of which reaches down to the thighs all the way round. It is named after the tunic, a garment of similar length worn in Ancient Rome.

== Development ==
=== 18th Century ===
The standardised uniform appeared with the, ever-increasing use of firearms in the late 17th century in order the find means to distinguish friend from enemy. By then the jerkin the principal garment up till then was gradually replaced by the justaucorps. Unlike the jerkin, which featured only a few colour variations, the cloth coat had a lining in a different colour, which was visible at the turned-up cuffs, the hem and the lapels, and eventually became the basis for the tonic or uniform jacket, that featured facings of another color. A further feature for distinguish them were colored stitching around the buttonholes, and the colored tape binding sometimes put around them. Since there were no rank insignia officers could only recognized by the better quality of their dress.

Despite its functional distinctions, the 18th-century tunic always followed the basic trends in civilian fashion regarding waistline, sleeve width and lapels, although Prussia, through its reforms from 1718 onwards, formed a deliberate exception. The colour scheme of the tunics was heavily influenced by economic factors. Whilst Prussian blue was affordable and concealed the inferior quality of the wool, red and green fabrics proved to be significantly more expensive and more difficult to produce to a consistent standard. As well as distinguishing between individual regiments, the colours of the tunics also served to represent social distinctions. Thus, Prussian guard regiments and French grenadiers wore white, whilst blue was reserved for royal regiments and red was traditionally reserved for the nobility and the officer corps. The detailed embellishment with brass or pewter buttons served to visually mark the hierarchy between enlisted men and officers. Trimmings, braids and embroidery fulfilled not only a decorative function but also the practical purpose of reinforcing heavily worn areas such as lapels and buttonholes.

Whilst the heavy cavalry gradually replaced their leather tunics with sturdy woollen fabric and dragoons retained the classic infantry tunic, the Hungarian style became established amongst the hussars. This was characterised by dolmans densely laced with cords and featuring stand-up collars, as well as the pelisse worn over the shoulder as protection against blows, whilst troops on the outer borders often had to make do with simple, unbleached woollen coats in grey or brown for reasons of cost.

In order to distinguish officers from ordinary soldiers in the second half of the century several features were introduced. In 1762 France made Epaulettes in Gold and Silver mandatory for all officers. Around twenty years later the Royal Navy had introduced three striped cuffs for its flag officers.

=== 19th Century ===
By the start of the nineteenth century, this had evolved into a jacket that was cut to waist level at the front and had a short tail behind; in the British Army, this was called a "coatee". A coat with a skirt that reached down to thigh length had been introduced into both the Russian and Prussian armies at the end of the Napoleonic Wars, but was not widely adopted. However, by the end of the 1830s, there was a feeling that uniforms didn't offer soldiers sufficient protection from the elements or freedom of movement. While Russia experimented again with the tunic, Prussia adopted them for their whole army in 1842.

Adoption France followed Prussia's lead, introducing a tunic for their line infantry in 1845. In 1851, the US Army introduced a long type of tunic which they called a "frock coat". Following experience in the Crimean War, the British eventually followed suit in 1855, their initial French-style double-breasted tunic being replaced by a single-breasted version in the following year. The tunic became almost universal military wear; at the start of the twentieth century, when the need for some kind of concealment became apparent, armies changed to drab-coloured uniforms, the British and Americans in 1902, the Germans in 1910. In the British Army, the tunic continued as a field uniform until the introduction of British Battledress in 1938; the tunic continues to be worn for formal and ceremonial occasions.

== Non-military use ==
The military tunic was quickly adopted by civilian organisations that needed a smart and practical uniform. It was introduced into the Royal Mail in 1868, and by the Metropolitan Police in 1864, replacing a tail-coat.

== Gallery ==
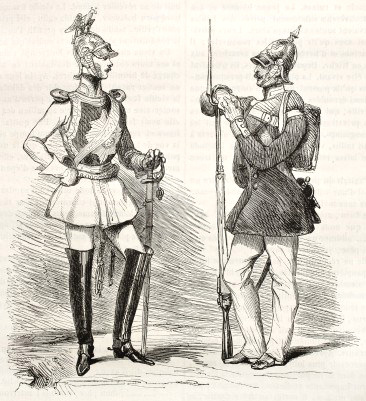
Prussian soldiers in tunics, 1845.

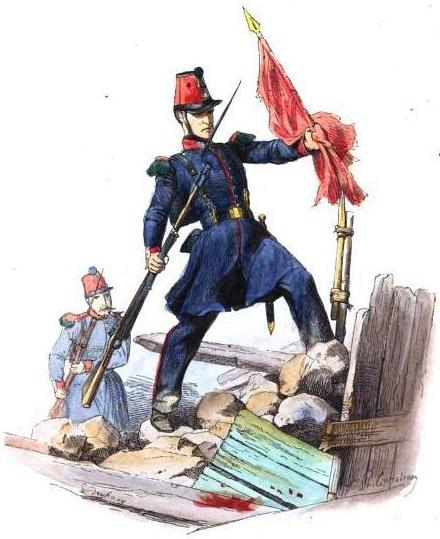
A member of the Garde nationale mobile in 1848, showing the long-skirted French Army tunic.

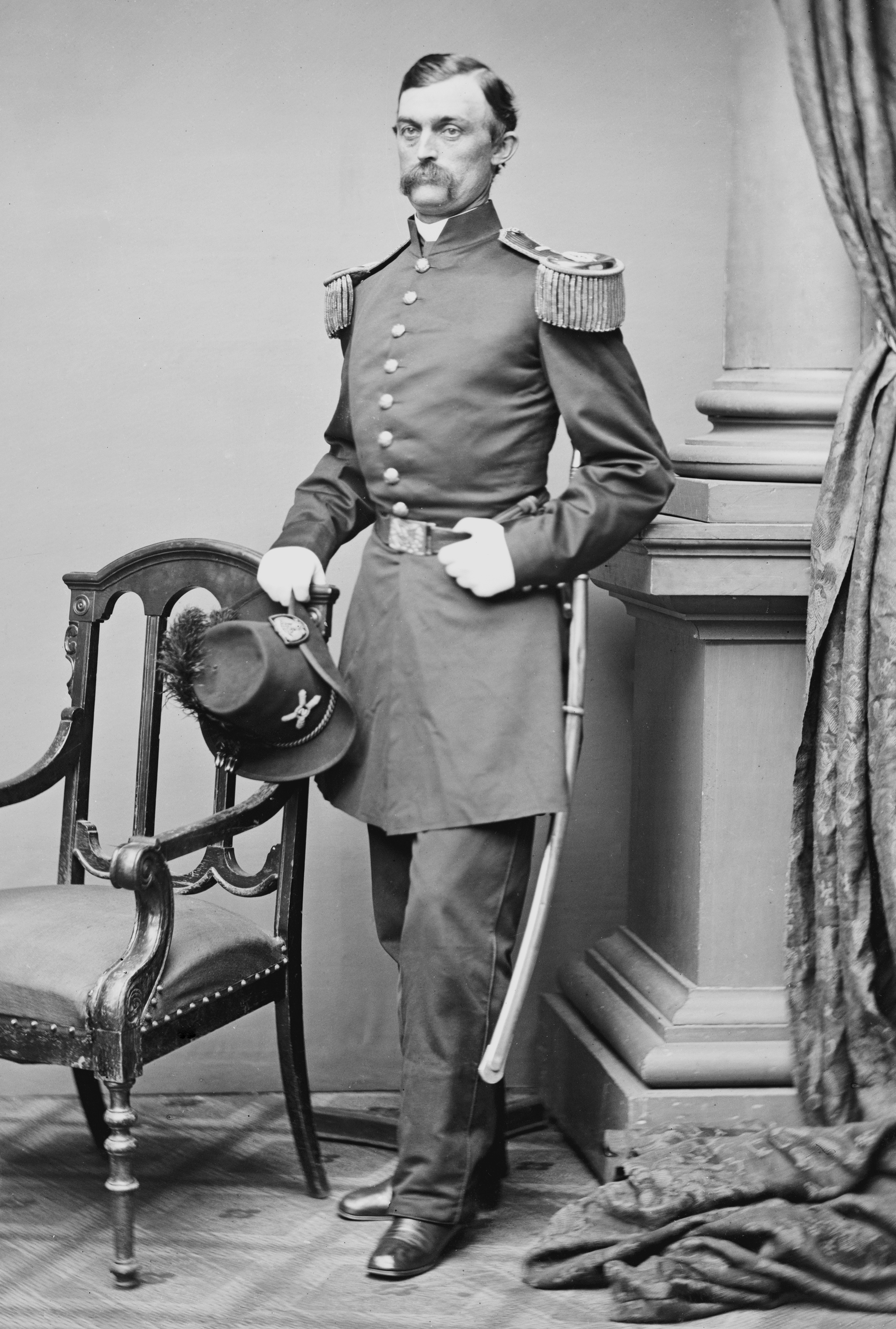
A Captain the United States Army during the 1860s wearing the long tunic or "frock coat" adopted in 1851.

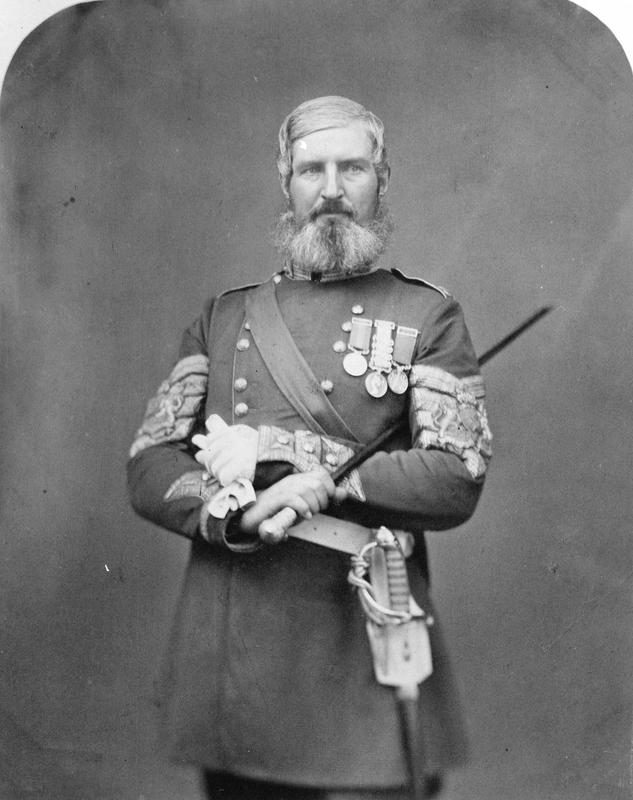
A Sergeant Major of the Scots Fusilier Guards wearing the double breasted tunic briefly adopted by the British Army in 1855.

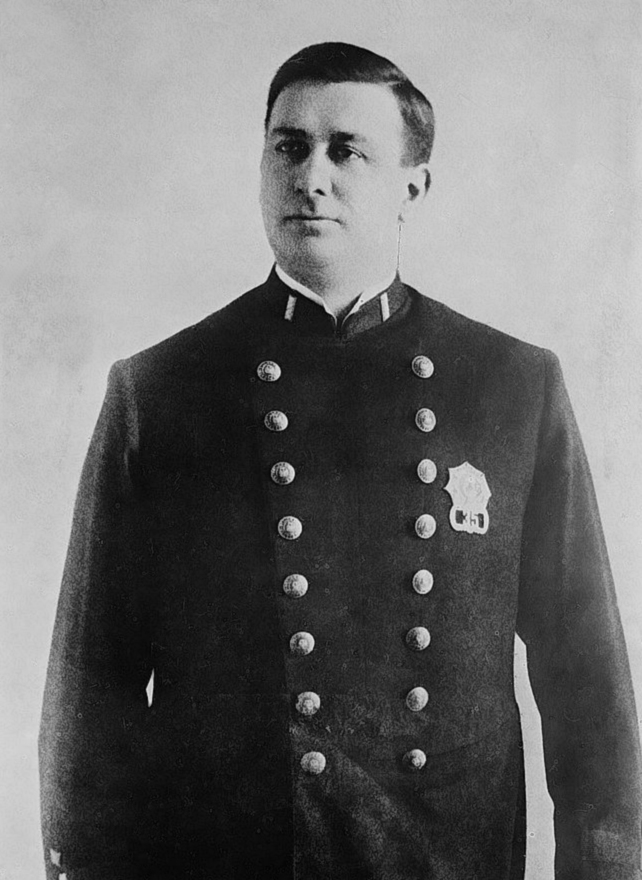
A Lieutenant of the New York City Police Department in 1912.

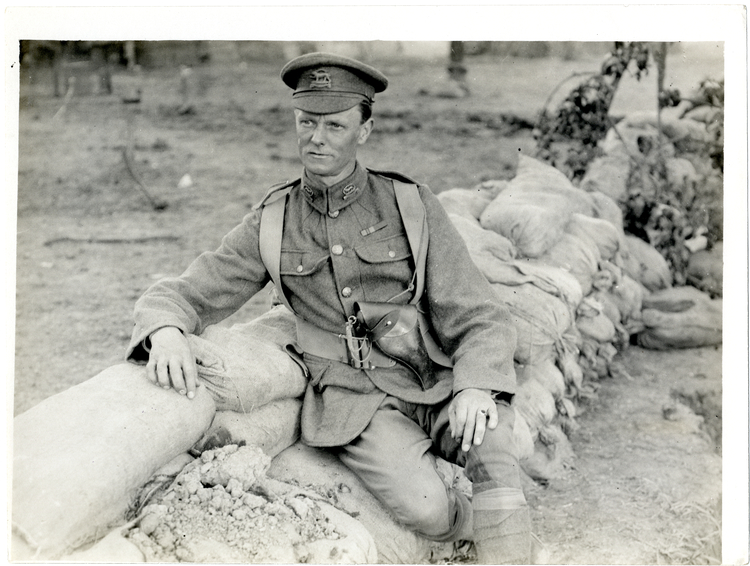
A Sergeant Major of the Leicestershire Regiment during the First World War in the 1907 pattern Service Dress tunic, with large patch pockets and a "rise-and-fall" collar.

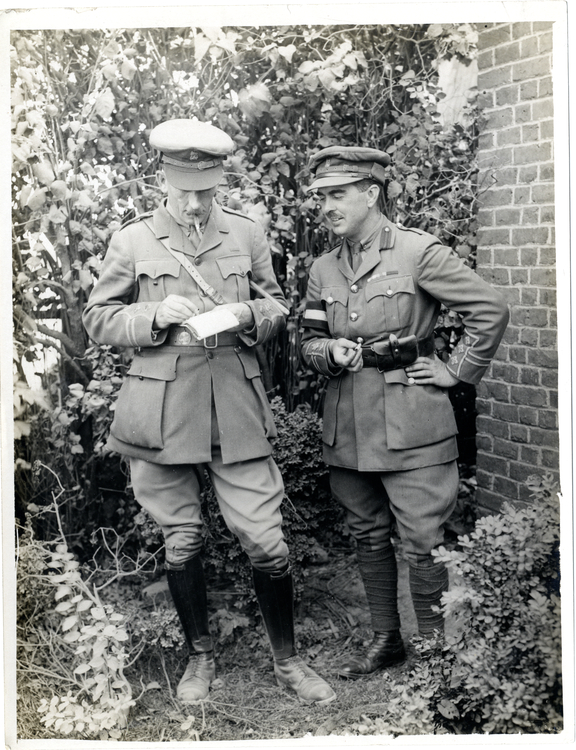
Two British staff officers wearing the officer's 1913 version of the Service Dress tunic, which featured an open collar revealing a shirt and tie below.

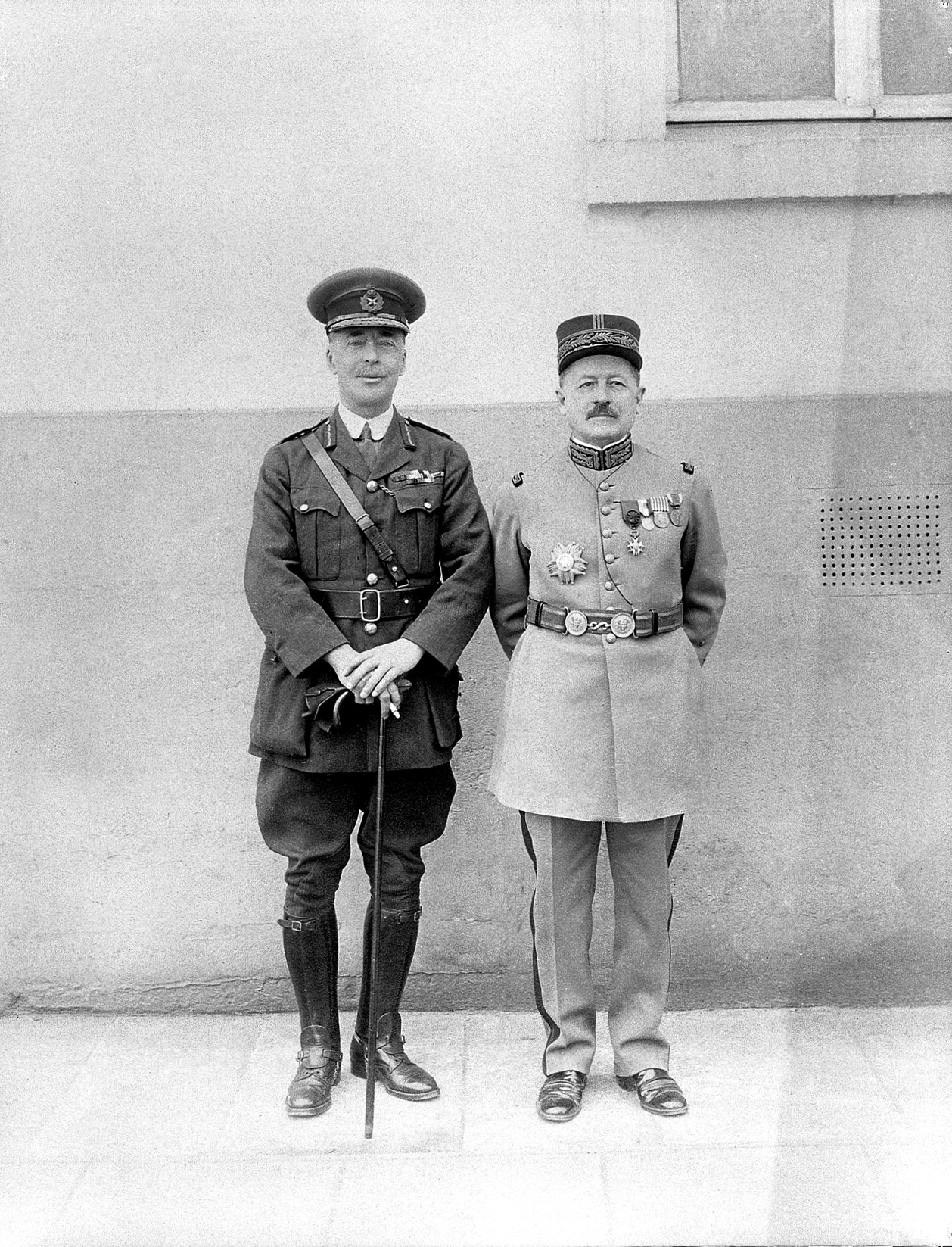
Senior British and French officers in 1925 showing contrasting styles of formal uniforms.

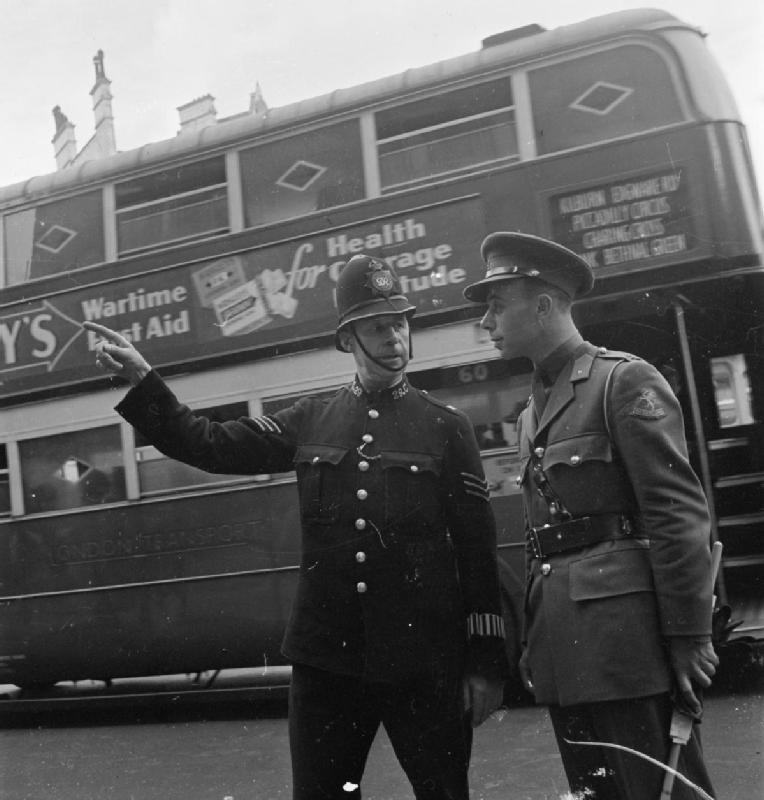
An officer of the Royal Netherlands Army asks directions from a Metropolitan Police officer in London, 1942. The police officer's tunic is of an obsolete design.

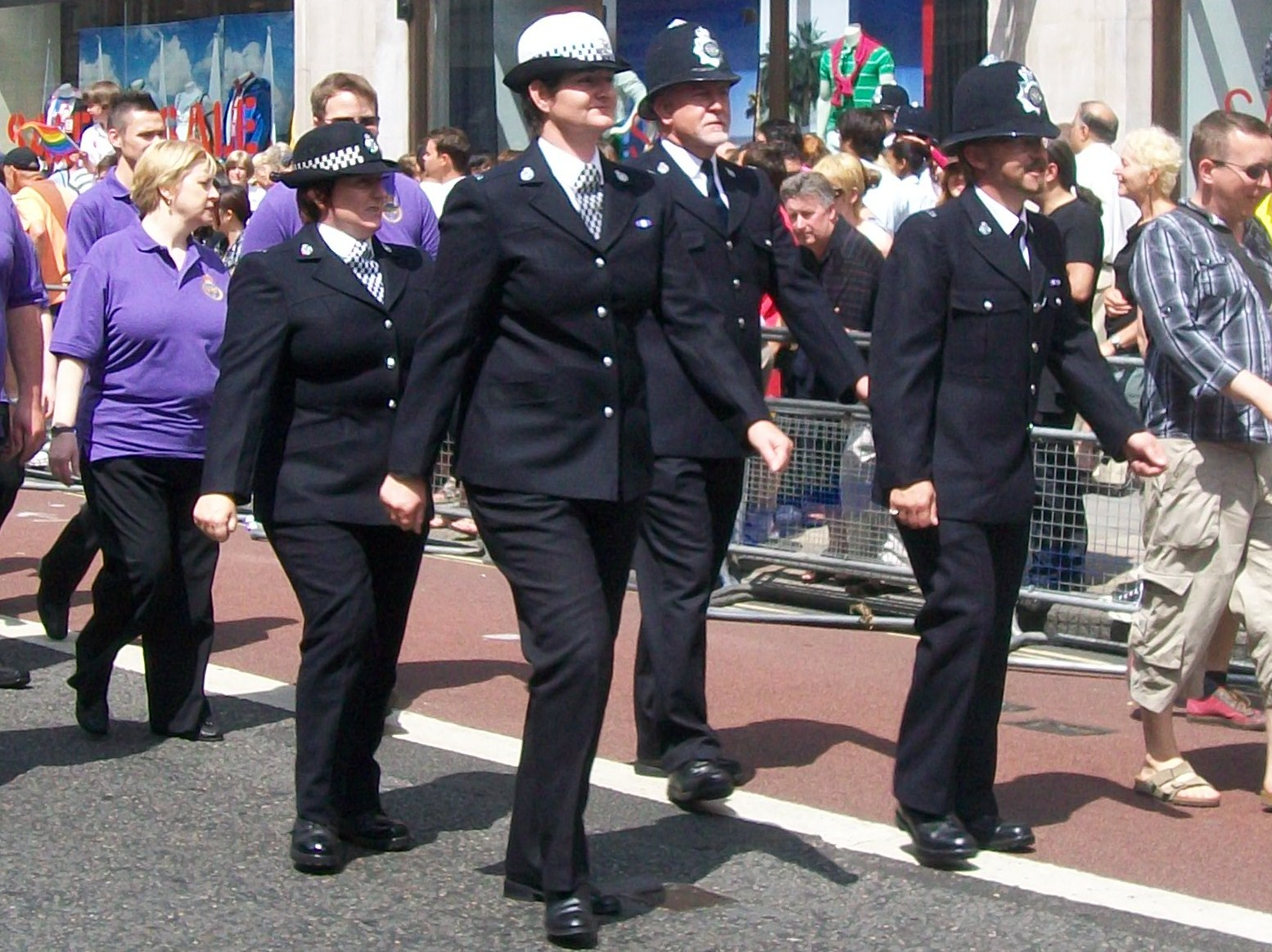
British police officers wearing the female and male variants of current British police tunics.

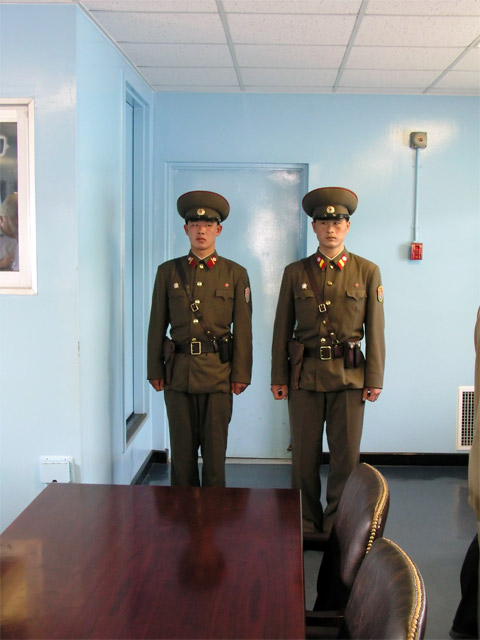
Soldiers of the North Korean Army in 2005.

== See also ==
- Adjustierung
- Waffenrock

== Bibliography ==
- Kannik, Preben (1968). Military Uniforms in Colour. London: Blandford Press.
- Damhorst, Mary Lynn; Miller, Kimberly A.; Michelman, Susan O. (1999). The Meanings of dress. Fairchild Publications. ISBN 1-56367-165-4.
- Bleckwenn, Hans; et al. (Battledress : the Uniforms of the World's Great Armies, 1700 to the Present) (1978). Schick, I.T. (ed.). European Wars of Eighteenth-Century Absolutism 1700 - 1763. Boston: Little Brown.
- Knötel, Herbert (1980). Uniforms of the World : a Compendium of Army, Navy and Airforce Uniforms : 1700-1937. London: Arms and Armour.
