= Kariba suit =

Style of Jamaican suit

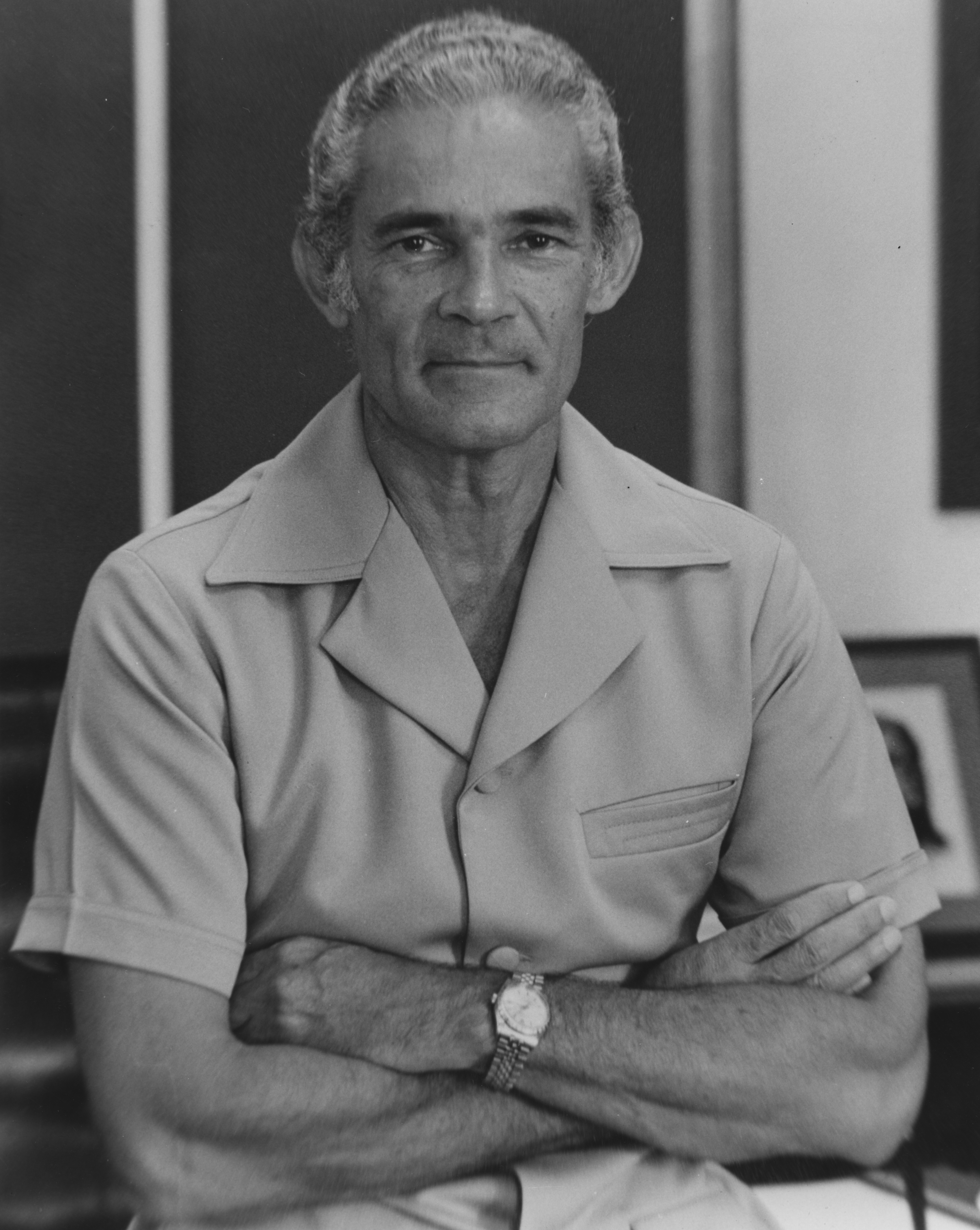
Michael Manley in a short-sleeved Kareeba suit, 1970s

A Kareeba or Kareeba suit is a two-piece suit for men created by Jamaican designer Ivy Ralph, mother of Sheryl Lee Ralph, in the early 1970s to be worn on business and formal occasions as a Caribbean replacement for the European-style suit and a visual symbol of decolonisation. The suit was popularised by Michael Manley, the leader of the People's National Party (PNP). The style of the jacket is considered a formalised version of a safari jacket or bush shirt common in Africa, worn without a shirt and tie, making it more comfortable clothing for a tropical climate.

After the PNP came to power in Jamaica in 1972, the Parliament passed a law recognising that the Kariba suit was appropriate for official functions and Manley, by now Prime Minister, wore a "fancy black one" when he met Queen Elizabeth II. Members of Manley's political party, the PNP, became recognizable by their adoption of the Kariba suit, rather than a western suit and tie favoured the opposition party JLP. The Kariba suit was a symbol of "cultural decolonisation". In his memoirs, The Politics of Change, Manley called the decision to wear a jacket and tie, in the tropical realities of the Caribbean, the "first act of psychological surrender" to "colonial trauma". In 1981 the newly formed JLP government announced that the Kariba suit was no longer considered proper dress for parliamentarians, and it fell out of fashion. By the time of his second tenure as Prime Minister (1989-1992), Manley had largely abandoned the look himself.

In its heyday, the style of suit was also popular with other politicians, notably people like D. K. Duncan, a member of PNP, Errol Barrow (prime minister of Barbados), Forbes Burnham (president of Guyana), and Julius Nyerere (president of Tanzania). Ivy Ralph, the designer of the Kariba suit, was awarded the Order of Distinction in 1999 for outstanding contribution to the promotion of fashion.

== See also ==
- Abacost
- Leisure suit
- Nehru jacket
- Madiba shirt
