= French (tunic) =

Russian and Soviet military jacket

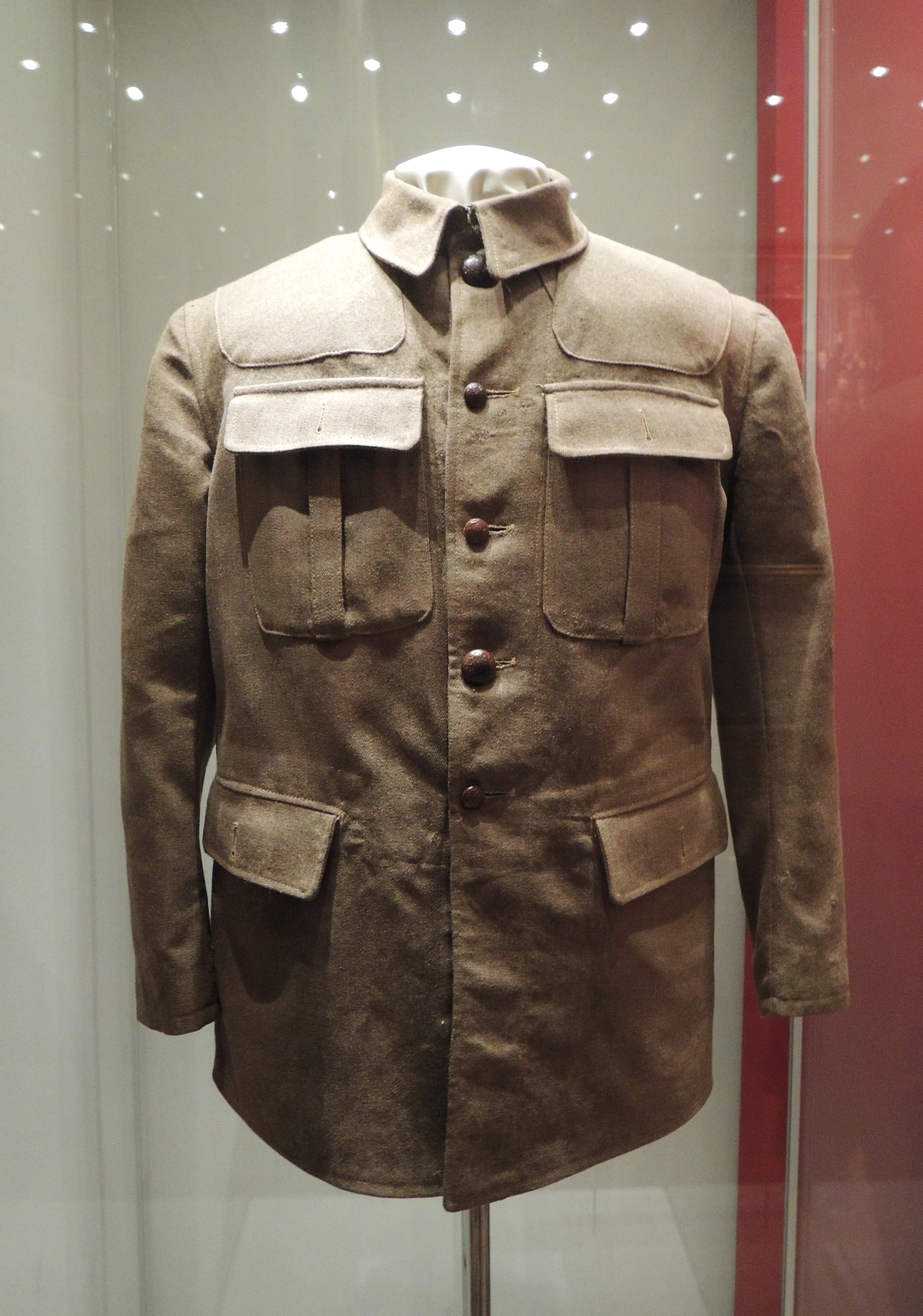
Vladimir Lenin's french (1920s)

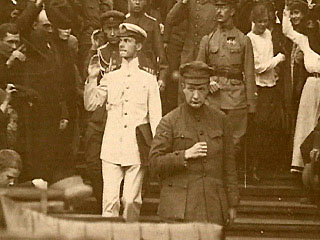
Alexander Kerensky in a french

French (Russian: френч [frʲenʲt͡ɕ]) was the designation of a particular type of military jacket or tunic in the Russian Empire and later in the Union of Soviet Socialist Republics (USSR).

In the years immediately preceding the start of World War I, several new models of khaki-grey uniform jackets were adopted in Russia for service wear by Imperial Army officers. In most cases these were related to (and influenced by) the latest creations in the armies of France and the United Kingdom. These loose-fitting and practical garments received the collective designation french in tribute to the supreme commander of the British Expeditionary Force to France, field marshal John French.

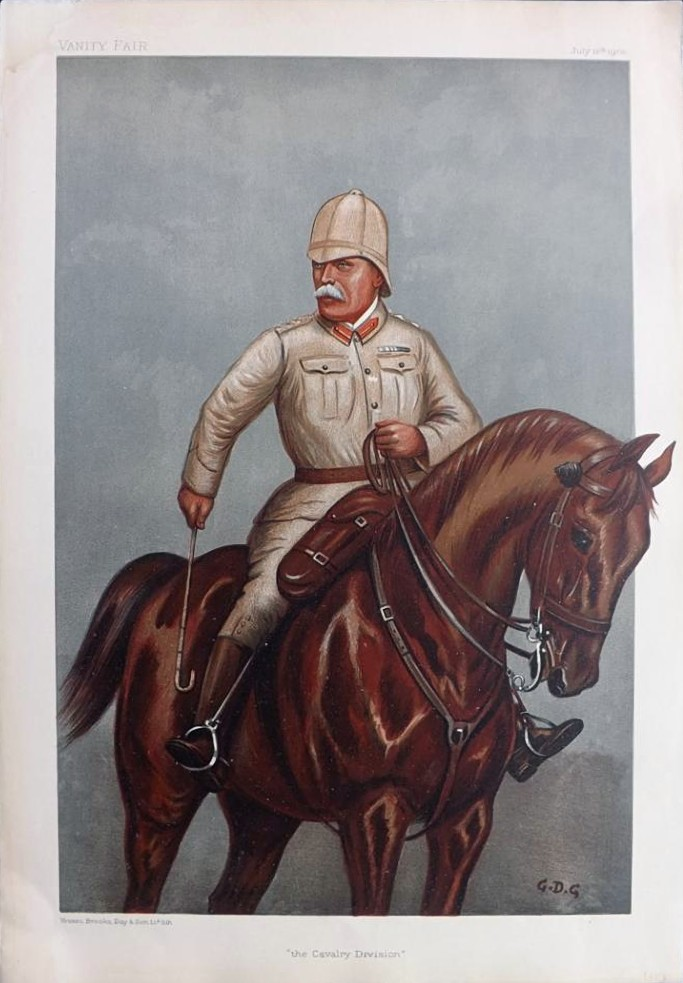
Illustration of John French, in his eponymous jacket, 1900

The main features of the french were as follows:

- soft collar – turndown version or standing version with button fastening,
- cuffs adjustable with the use of martingales or buttons
- four big pockets (appliquéd, with buttons) with flaps (two upper chest, two below).

In the Red Army of the Soviet Union it was usually worn by commanding officers, chiefs and political officers and from 1924 to 1943.

In the air force there was a limited number of frenches regularly worn by British officers. It was characterised by an open collar, to be worn with tie or scarf.

== Evolution to the Stalin tunic ==
The French tunic eventually evolved in the 1920s to the Stalin tunic, which was adopted by several political leaders, such as Joseph Stalin.

== See also ==
- Military uniform
- List of Russian inventions
