= Waffenrock =

Medieval German outer garment

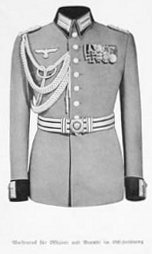
WWII model of the Waffenrock

Waffenrock (also German: Waffenkleid; English: surcoat or tunic) was originally a medieval German term for an outer garment, worn by knights over their armor.

Later, Waffenrock became the generic term for any military uniform, including dress and parade uniforms, and also referred to epaulets or shoulder boards with rank insignia, as well as uniform cuffs, badges, and other insignia. As of 1945, the term is no longer in use by German-speaking armed forces, though the Swedish term for a military tunic is the cognate vapenrock.

== Historical roots ==
Waffenrock was derived from the substantive wâfenroc or wâpenroc ("weapon tunic") of knights. It was often made from expensive silk cloth. The colors of this cloth corresponded to those on the shield quartering. In the spirit of this, the heraldic figures on the coat of arms were frequently designed with gold and silver embroidery.

In the Prussian Army, the service coat was commonly called Montierung. It was renamed to Soldatenrock ("soldier's tunic") in October 23, 1842, by the Prussian cabinet order of His Majesty (German: allerhöchste Kabinettsorder). In 1843, it was finally renamed to Waffenrock. All German-speaking armies commonly used this wording, except for the Austro-Hungarian Army (later Austrian Army), where the designation Adjustierung was in use.

== World War II use ==
In its Wehrmacht form as issued in 1935, it was a formfitting thigh-length eight-button tunic of fine feldgrau wool, without external pockets. The collar was taller than the service tunic and bore more elaborate Litzen, embroidered all in silver-white and mounted on Waffenfarbe backing; smaller Ärmelpatten, similar in appearance to Litzen, appeared under the buttons on the dark-green Swedish cuffs. Waffenfarbe piping also edged the collar, cuffs, front closure, and scalloped rear vent.

Officers wore a formal belt of silver braid. Trousers were steingrau, with the outer seams piped in Waffenfarbe. In the full-dress uniform (grosser Gesellschaftanzug) the Waffenrock was worn with medals, aiguillette (officers), trousers and shoes, a peaked cap (Schirmmütze), gloves, and sword (officers/senior NCOs) or dress bayonet (enlisted). Parade dress substituted the steel helmet and jackboots. Semi-formal (kleiner Gesellschaftanzug) and walking-out (Ausgangsanzug) uniforms were as full-dress, but without aiguillette and with ribbons replacing medals.

Production and issue of the Waffenrock were suspended in 1940, and either the service or the officers' ornamented uniform was worn for dress occasions instead. However, the Waffenrock remained authorized for walking out for those who had or could purchase it. It was a widespread if unauthorized practice to loan a soldier a Waffenrock from regimental stocks to get married in, as evidenced by many wartime wedding photos.

== Historical examples ==
The gallery below shows examples of Waffenrock over the suit of armor.

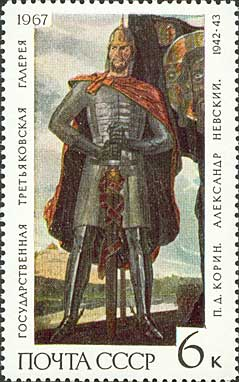
Alexander Nevsky in Waffenrock with suit of armor and sword

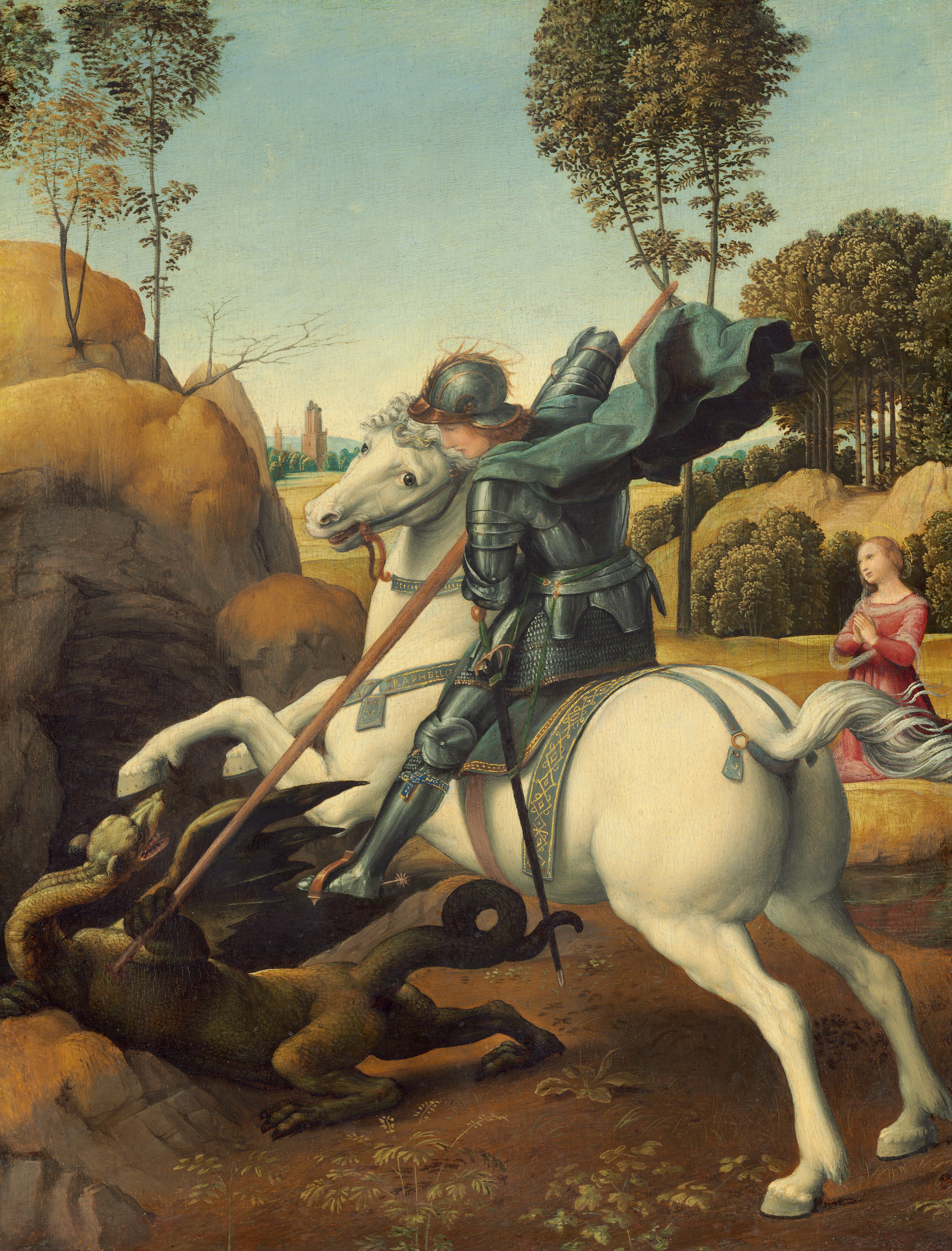
Saint George in a suit of armor, with a tunic (German: Waffenrock) and lance

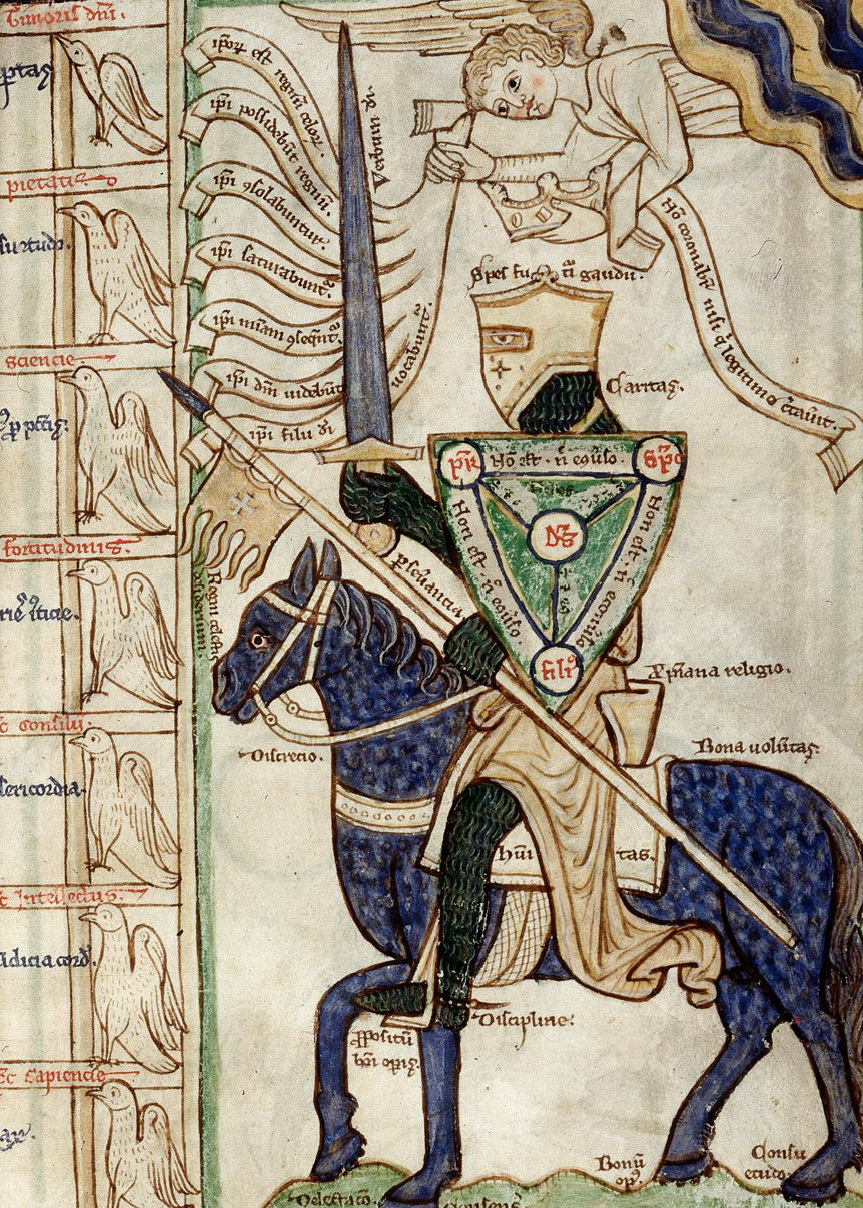
Knight in suit of armor and Waffenrock, preparing to battle

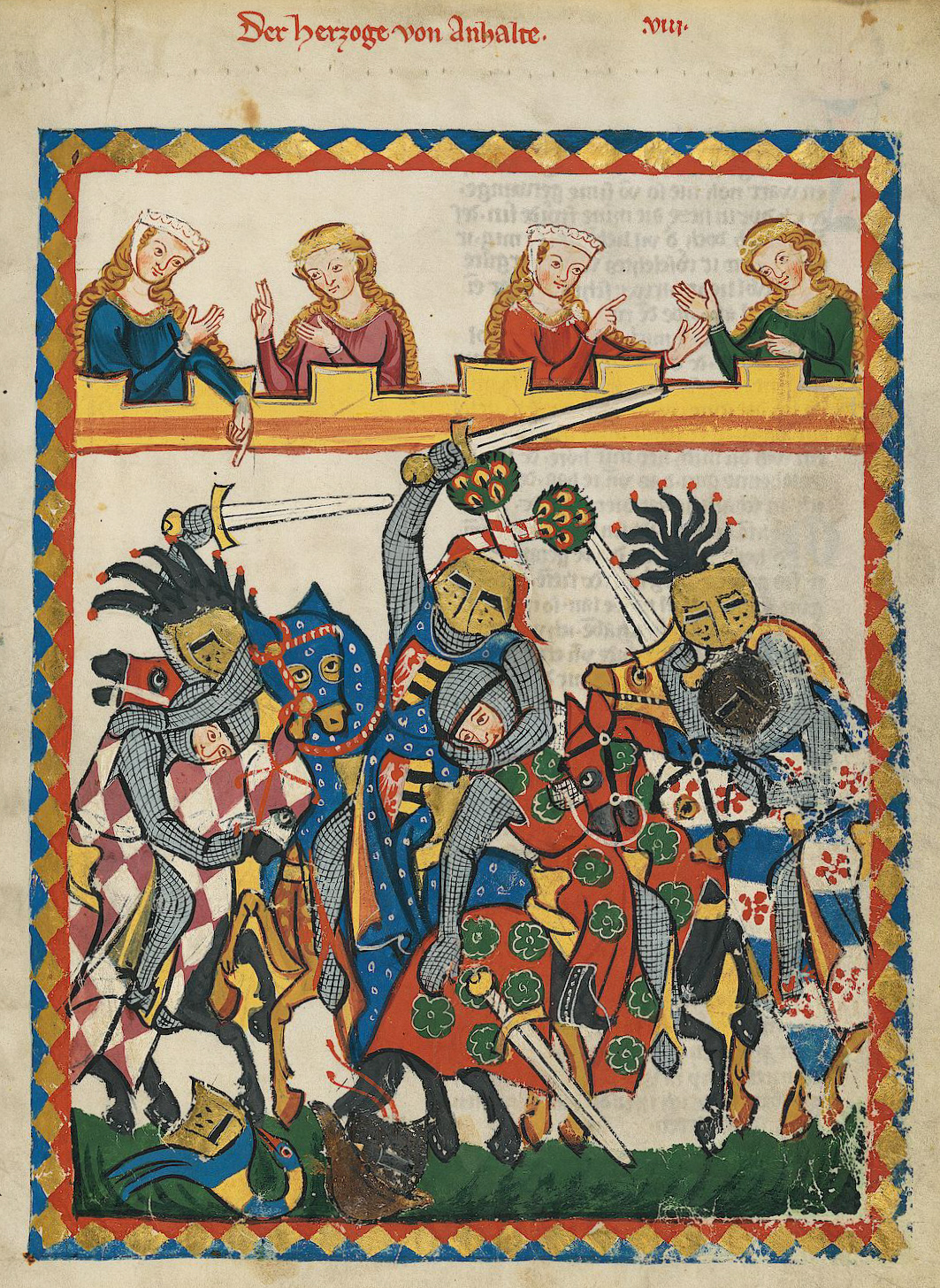
Fighting knights in a suit of armor and Waffenrock

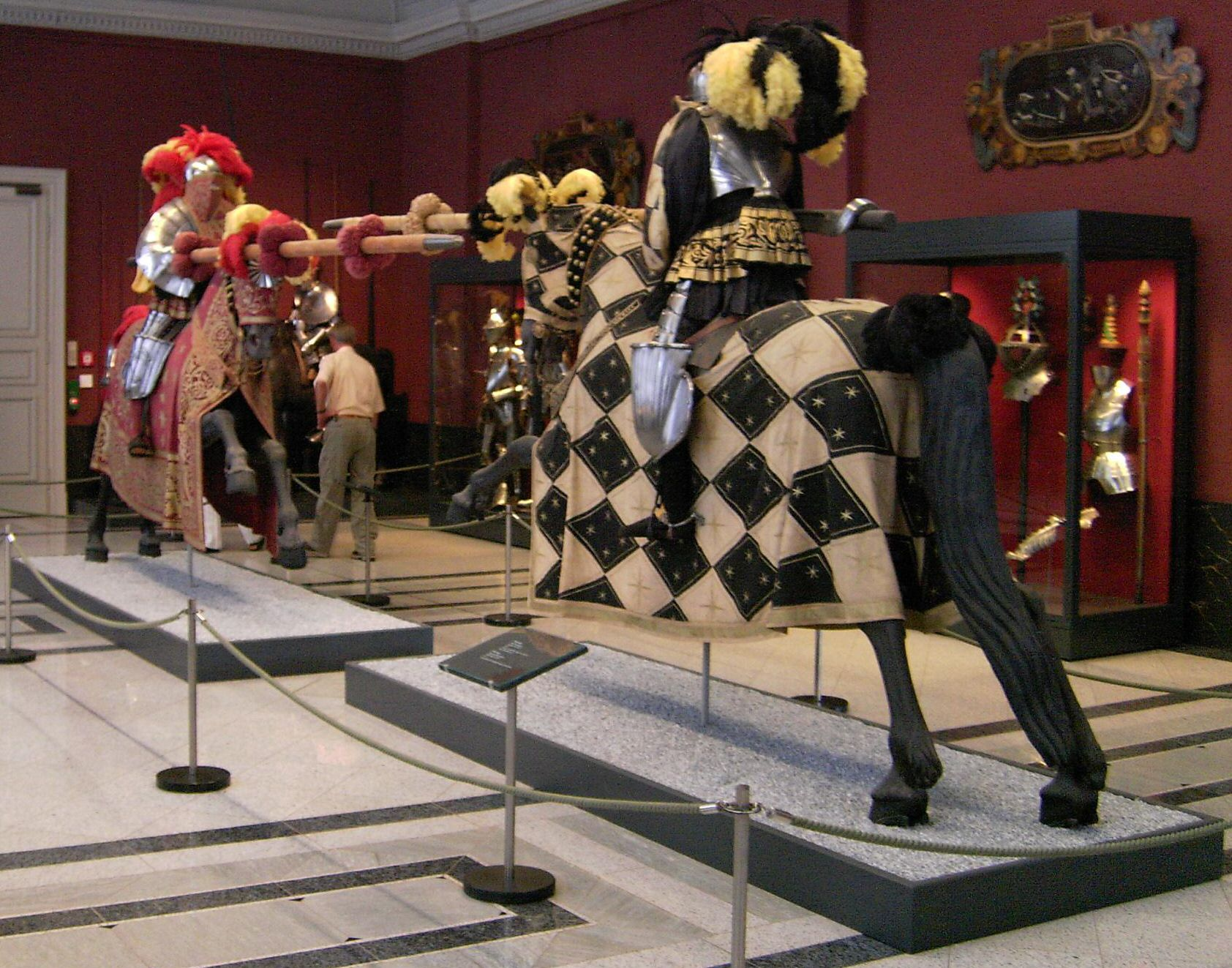
Tourney in suit of armor and Waffenrock (16th or 17th century)

The gallery below shows Waffenrock examples until 1945.

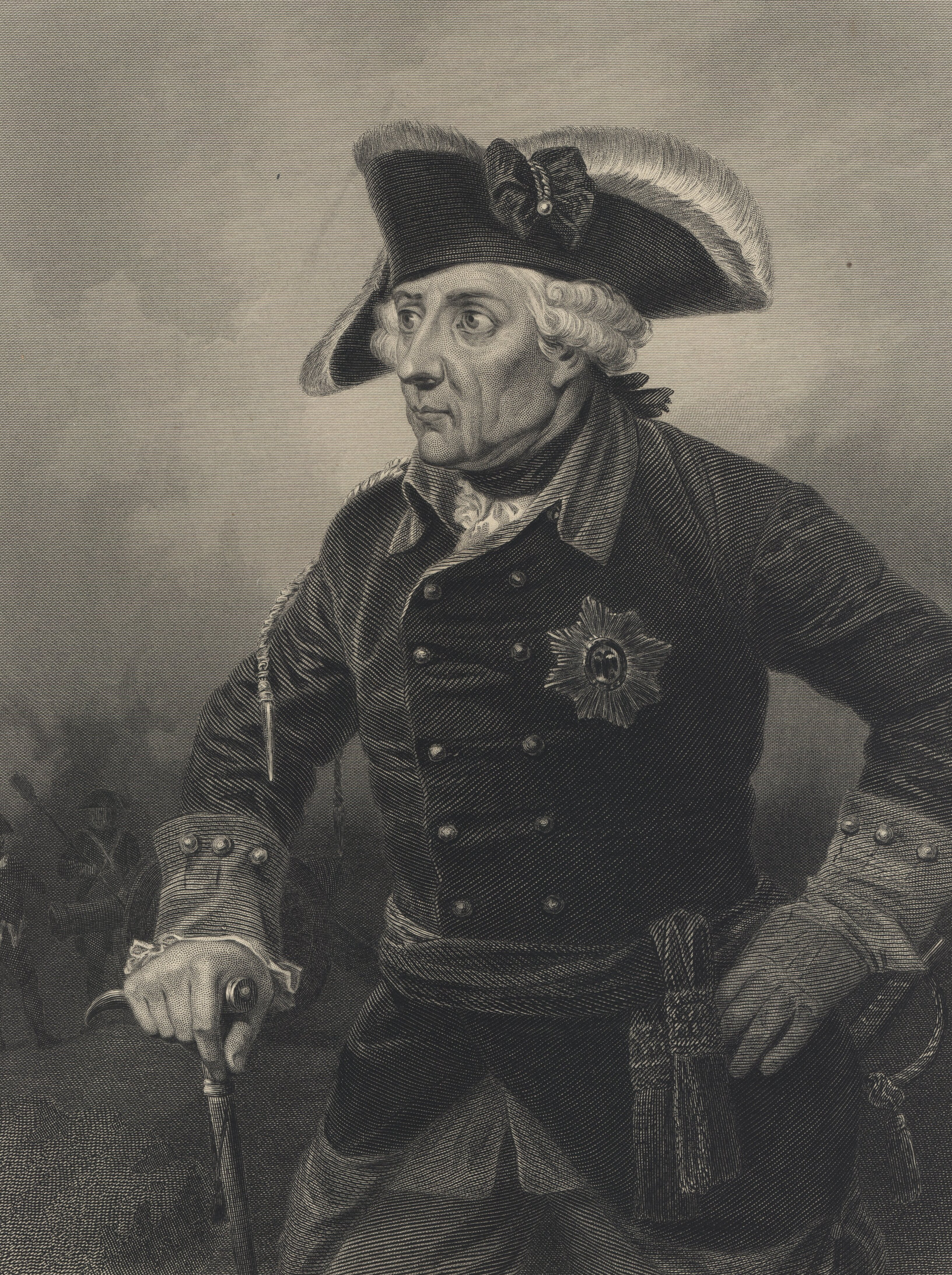
Frederick II of Prussia in Waffenrock (dress tunic)

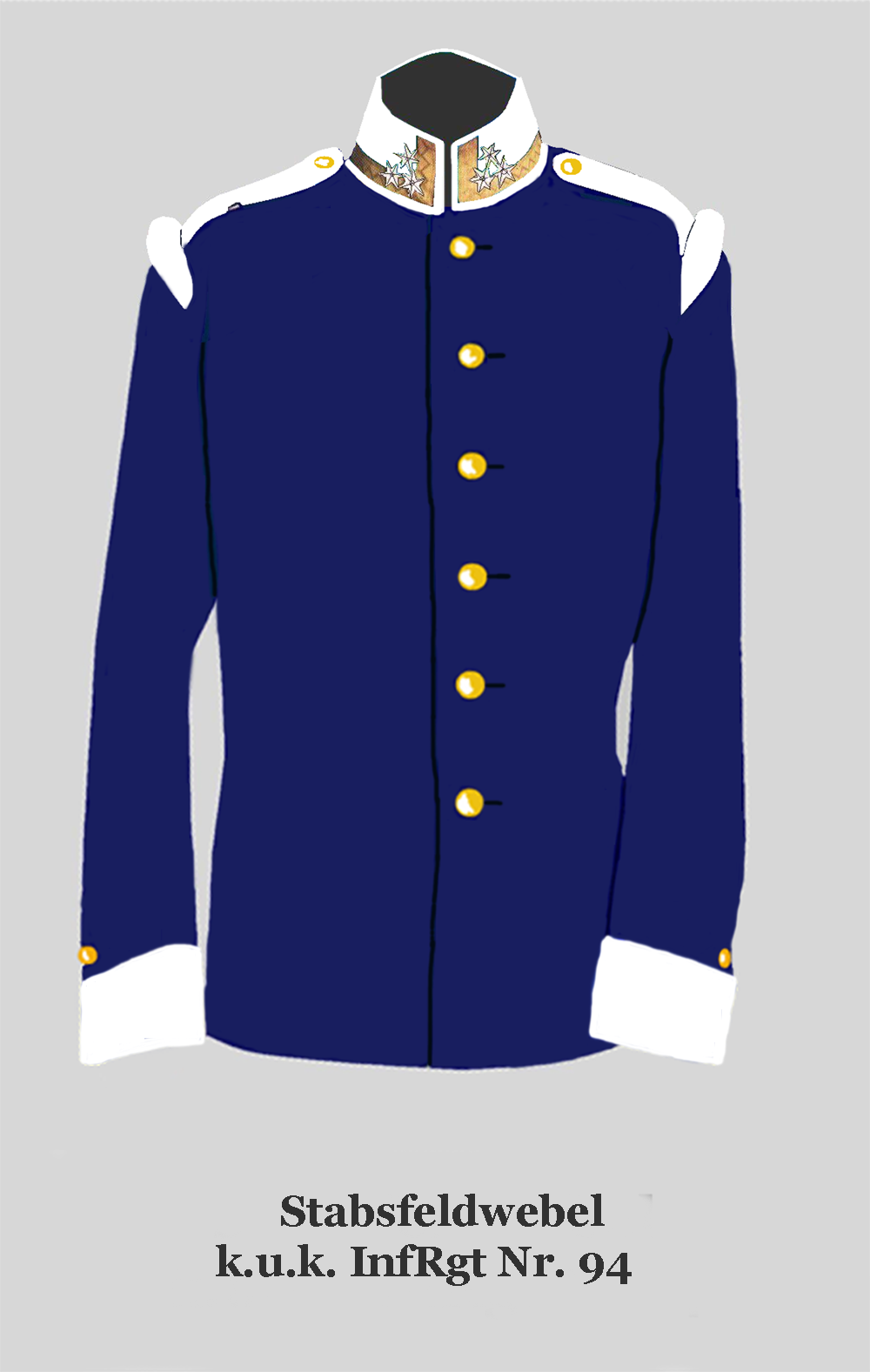
Waffenrock k.u.k. 94th InfRgt, Stabsfeldwebel in white egalisation colour

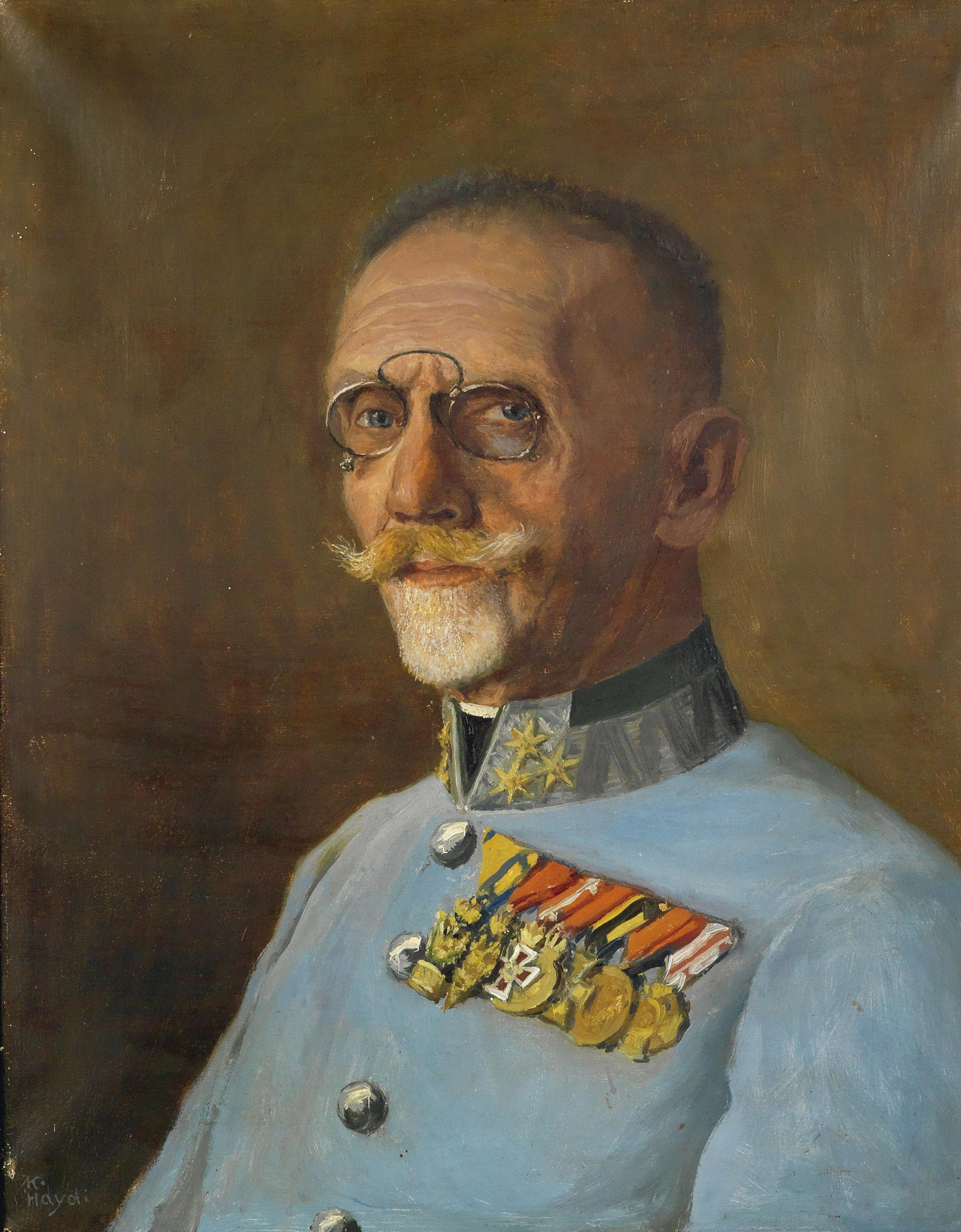
Waffenrock k.u.k. colonel of the engineer corps in steel-green egalisation colour

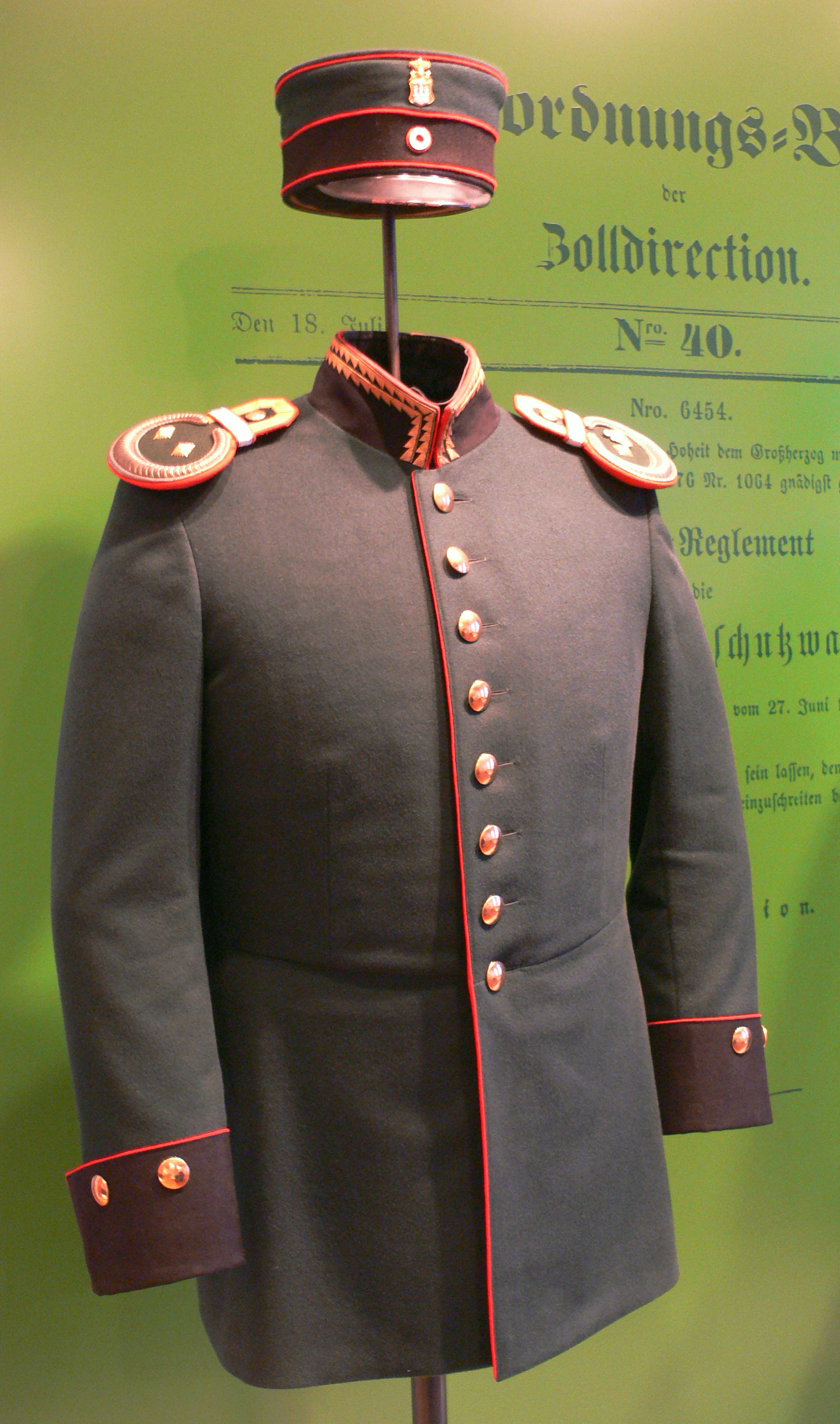
Waffenrock of a customs inspector in Hamburg 1888-1919

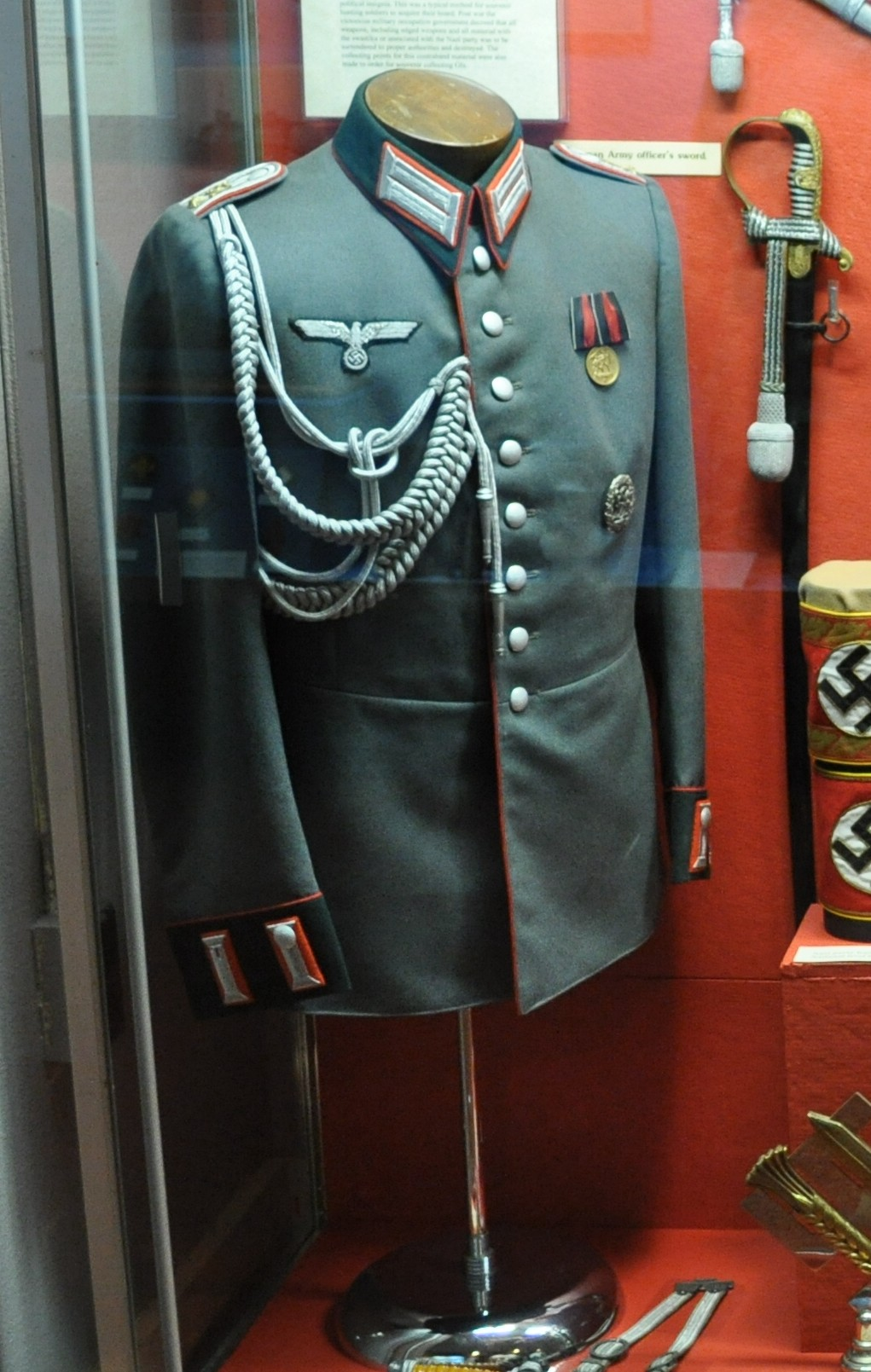
Waffenrock Hauptmann of the Wehrmacht ca. 1939

== See also ==
- Adjustierung
- Tunic (military)
- Gakuran
