= Madiba shirt =

Type of clothing associated with Nelson Mandela

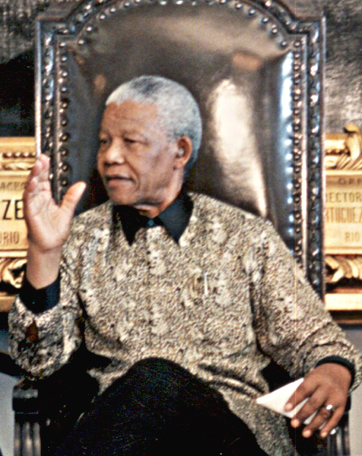
Nelson Mandela in 1998, wearing a Madiba shirt

A Madiba shirt is a loose-fitting silk shirt, adapted from Indonesian batik and usually adorned in a bright and colourful print. It became known in the 1990s, when Nelson Mandela—then elected President of South Africa—added the item to his regular attire. Mandela popularised this type of shirt, elevating the seemingly casual garment to formal situations.

== Design ==
A form of casual wear, Madiba shirts are loose-fitting, usually worn without a necktie and untucked from trousers. It is adapted from Indonesian batik clothing, and generally made of cotton or silk patterned with vivid colours. Mandela was said to prefer earthier tones for the shirt, though Madiba shirts with bright colors have endured in popularity.

== History ==
Yusuf Surtee, a clothing-store owner who supplied Mandela with outfits for decades, said the Madiba design is based on Mandela's request for a shirt like Indonesian president Suharto's batik attire. Fashion designer Desré Buirski presented this type of shirt (and her contact information) to Mandela as a gift on 7 May 1994 by getting it to a bodyguard during a visit to a Cape Town synagogue; Mandela wore the shirt to the dress rehearsal for his presidential inauguration. Sonwabile Ndamase said he "was the first to do it" in 1990.

The name "Madiba shirt" comes from Mandela's Xhosa clan name. The affectionate name became linked to the shirts when Mandela wore them to many business and political meetings during 1994–1999 and after his tenure as President of South Africa.

== Legacy ==
Within the clothing industry, Mandela's willingness to wear the casual attire—he eventually owned dozens of the shirts—marked a new style of international business dress. In a broader sense, the fashion choice can be read as a signal of "friendly" regime change away from strict formality and toward greater acceptance. It can also be argued that, throughout his life, Mandela's fashion was a significant part of his public image: in the 1950s, he dressed in sophisticated clothes; during the Rivonia Trial in 1963–64, he brought out Xhosa traditions with a leopard-skin kaross; and after his release from prison, he wore the colourful Madiba shirt often. In 2013, art historian Lize van Robbroeck wrote:

Mandela's idiosyncratic shirts (now, of course, avidly marketed) signal his freedom to take or leave Western conventions of power: they are the sartorial embodiment of a vision of global citizenship. While the suit speaks the language of legality, constitutions, and contracts, the Mandela shirt speaks the language of freedom and self-constitution, of a humanism that is not exclusively defined by the West. This semiotics of emancipation is beautifully communicated in the comic book when a young girl points at Mandela and asks, "Excuse me, but why do you wear a shirt like that?" Mandela laughingly replies, "You must remember that I was in jail for 27 years. I want to feel freedom!"

Madiba shirts (and variants) are popular among tourists to South Africa, South African sportspeople, and Tanzanian men (possibly as a sign of general African solidarity or reflecting Africa's supposedly more laid-back dress than Europe).

== See also ==
- Desré Buirski
- Batik
- Culture of Indonesia

== Bibliography ==
- Grant, Terri; Nodoba, Gaontebale (August 2009), "Dress Codes in Post-Apartheid South African Workplaces", Business Communication Quarterly, 72 (3): 360–365, doi:10.1177/1080569909340683, S2CID 167453202
- Maynard, Margaret (2004), Dress and Globalisation, Manchester University Press, ISBN 9780719063893
- Pinto Coelho, Teresa (December 2015), "A Vida de Nelson Mandela (2014), tradução de Nelson Mandela. A Very Short Introduction (2008) de Elleke Boehmer" (PDF), Gaudium Sciendi: 137–142
- Ramoupi, Neo Lekgotla laga; Mkhabela, Justice (November 2011), "Celebrating Rolihlahla Nelson Mandela: Past, Present and Future" (PDF), Policy Brief, no. 61, Africa Institute of South Africa, pp. 1–6
- Smith, Daniel (2014), How to Think Like Mandela, Michael O'Mara, ISBN 9781782432401
- van Robbroeck, Lize (2014), "The Visual Mandela: A Pedagogy of Citizenship", The Cambridge Companion to Nelson Mandela, Cambridge University Press, pp. 244–266, doi:10.1017/CCO9781139003766.015, ISBN 9781139003766
