= Russian Armed Forces =

Military forces of the Russian Federation

Armed Forces of the Russian Federation
- Вооружённые си́лы Росси́йской Федера́ции
- Emblem of the Russian Armed Forces

- Banner of the Russian Armed Forces
- Founded: 2 November 1721; 305 years ago
- Current form: 7 May 1992; 34 years ago
- Service branches: Branches: Ground Forces; Navy; Aerospace Forces; Russian Air Force; Russian Space Forces; Air and Missile Defense Forces; Arms: Strategic Rocket Forces; Airborne Forces; Unmanned Systems Forces; Special Operations Forces; Logistical Support
- Headquarters: Ministry of Defence, Moscow
- Website: mil.ru

Leadership
- Supreme Commander-in-Chief: Vladimir Putin
- Minister of Defence: Andrey Belousov
- Chief of the General Staff: Valery Gerasimov

Personnel
- Military age: 18
- Conscription: 12 months
- Active personnel: refer to IISS Military Balance
- Reserve personnel: refer to post-2022 IISS Military Balance

Expenditure
- Budget: US$190 billion (2024) (ranked 3rd)
- Percent of GDP: 7.5% (2024)

Industry
- Domestic suppliers: See list: Rostec; Rosatom; United Aircraft Corporation; United Shipbuilding Corporation; Russian Helicopters; Tactical Missiles Corporation; Almaz-Antey; High Precision Systems; Moscow Institute of Thermal Technology; Kalashnikov Concern; Military Industrial Company; Uralvagonzavod; Kurganmashzavod; KAMAZ
- Foreign suppliers: Belarus (MZKT); Iran (HESA); North Korea
- Annual imports: US$905 million (2010–2021)
- Annual exports: US$74.535 billion (2010–2021)

Related articles
- History: Military history of the Russian Federation
- Ranks: Army ranks Navy ranks Aerospace Forces ranks

The Armed Forces of the Russian Federation, (Note: Russian: Вооружённые Си́лы Росси́йской Федера́ции, romanised: Vooruzhyonnyye Sily Rossiyskoy Federatsii) commonly referred to as the Russian Armed Forces, are the military of Russia. They are organised into three service branches—the Ground Forces, Navy, and Aerospace Forces—three independent combat arms (the Strategic Rocket Forces, Airborne Forces and Unmanned Systems Forces) and the Special Operations Forces Command.

The Russian Armed Forces are the world's fifth-largest military force, with about one million active duty personnel and close to two million reservists. They maintain the world's largest stockpile of nuclear weapons, possess the world's second-largest fleet of ballistic missile submarines, and are the only armed forces outside the United States and China that operate strategic bombers. As of 2025, Russia has the world's third-highest military expenditure, at approximately US$190 billion, or 7.5 percent of GDP.

The Russian military is a hybrid system that combines conscripts with contracted volunteers; with certain exceptions, Russian law mandates one year of military service for all male citizens aged 18–27. Despite efforts to professionalise its ranks since the early 2000s, it remains heavily reliant on conscripts, with contract soldiers being concentrated in cadre and elite units. In the years before the 2022 Russian invasion of Ukraine, the Ground Forces were ordered to create battalion tactical groups out of enlisted soldiers, separating them from conscript units. These were kept at a higher state of readiness and could be deployed outside of Russia under Russian law.

Despite its perceived military strength, deficiencies have been noted in Russia's overall combat performance and its ability to effectively project hard power. The ongoing Russo-Ukrainian war has exposed weaknesses such as endemic corruption, rigid command and control structure, inadequate training, and poor morale. The Russian Armed Forces have experienced successive losses of occupied/annexed territory, the large-scale destruction and squandering of their equipment, and a notably high casualty rate. Western analysts have observed that Russia continues struggling with military professionalisation, but remains capable of rapidly reconstituting its capabilities and has "combat experience."

Directly controlled by the Security Council of Russia, the Russian Armed Forces form part of the country's defence services under Russian law, fulfilling this capacity alongside the Border Guard of the Federal Security Service, the National Guard, the Ministry of Internal Affairs, the Federal Protective Service, the Foreign Intelligence Service, and the Ministry of Emergency Situations.

== History ==
=== Formation and early history (1991–2008) ===
The Soviet Union officially dissolved on 25 December 1991. For the next year various attempts to keep its unity and to transform the Soviet Armed Forces into the military of the Commonwealth of Independent States (CIS) failed. Over time, some units stationed in the newly independent republics swore loyalty to their new national governments, while a series of treaties between the newly independent states divided up the military's assets. Marshal Yevgeny Shaposhnikov worked to create a unified CIS armed forces, but President Boris Yeltsin established the Ministry of Defence of the Russian Federation in May 1992.

On 7 May 1992, Yeltsin signed a decree establishing the Russian Armed Forces and assumed the duties of the Supreme Commander-in-Chief. Colonel General Pavel Grachev became the Minister of Defence, and was promoted as Russia's first general of the army on assuming the post. By the end of 1993, the CIS military structures had become military cooperation structures. Grachev and his allies worked to undermine Shaposhnikov, and there was opposition to his efforts from the newly independent states. The May 1992 creation of the Russian Ministry of Defence was the practical end of the Soviet military; Shaposhnikov and his small staff were evicted from the Soviet General Staff and Defence Ministry buildings in central Moscow, being sent to the former Warsaw Pact headquarters on the city's outskirts. The pretence of the CIS armed forces continued until June 1993, when the Russian Defence Ministry refused to provide necessary funding for it, and Shaposhnikov resigned as its commander-in-chief.

Apart from assuming control of the bulk of the former Soviet Internal Troops and the KGB Border Troops, seemingly the only independent defence move the new Russian government made before March 1992 involved announcing the establishment of a National Guard. Until 1995, it was planned to form at least 11 brigades numbering 3,000 to 5,000 each, with a total of no more than 100,000. National Guard military units were to be deployed in 10 regions, including in Moscow (three brigades), (two brigades), and a number of other important cities and regions. In Moscow alone 15,000 personnel expressed their desire to service in the new Russian Army, mostly former Soviet Armed Forces servicemen. In the end, President Yeltsin tabled a decree "On the temporary position of the Russian Guard", but it was not put into practice. During the 1990s twelve other agencies besides the Ministry of Defence also had military formations, and were known as "power ministries."

In the next few years, Russian forces withdrew from central and eastern Europe, as well as from some newly independent post-Soviet states. Under agreements signed with several states, the last forces were withdrawn from most of these regions by 31 August 1994. Soviet nuclear forces were either dismantled or returned to Russia under agreements with Belarus, Kazakhstan, and Ukraine, while the conventional forces caused more issues. Although the withdrawal was largely peaceful, and entire units were moved piecemeal to the Russian Federation, some units remained in newly independent countries, such as the Black Sea Fleet in Ukraine's Crimea, the 14th Army in Moldova's Transnistria, and other units in Georgia and Tajikistan. Some of them became involved in local ethnic or political conflicts. Russia continues to have several bases in foreign countries, especially in the former Soviet republics.

During the presidency of Boris Yeltsin, reforms to the military focused on reductions in personnel and restructuring of the armed services. In 1992 there were five branches: the Ground Forces, the Air Force, the Navy, the Strategic Missile Forces, and the Air Defence Forces. By 2001, the Air Defence Forces were combined into the Air Force, and the Strategic Missile Forces were reduced to an independent combat arm. In the late 1990s there was a debate between Chief of the General Staff Anatoly Kvashnin and Minister of Defence Igor Sergeyev on whether to prioritise funding to conventional or nuclear forces. The nuclear forces were deemed more important, and a result, the Navy, Air Force, and Air Defence Forces were cut in half, and the Ground Forces saw the largest reduction, by two-thirds. The military's overall strength was reduced from 2,720,000 in 1992 to 1,004,000 in 2000. In the same time period, the Ground Forces were cut from 1,400,000 to 348,000; the Air Force and Air Defence Forces from 300,000 and 356,000, respectively, to a combined 184,600; the Navy from 320,000 to 171,500; and the Strategic Missile Forces from 181,000 to 149,000. The Airborne Forces were reduced from 64,300 to 48,500 in the late 1990s. In 1998 the post of Ground Forces Commander-in-Chief was temporarily abolished, and replaced by a Ground Forces directorate.

There were widespread social and economic problems caused by the sudden arrival of troops at bases in Russia that did not have accommodations for them, and by drastic military spending cuts as Russia faced an economic crisis during its transition to a market economy. This led to a severe decline in discipline, with crime and the already-existing hazing of conscripts (dedovshchina) becoming more common, which in turn led to draft dodging. Many officers and sergeants left the military. Equipment maintenance and training also drastically declined. As of 1998, there had been no exercises above the division level since 1992, and annual flight hours for pilots were reduced to 25, far less than in NATO states. The military's decline was evident during the First Chechen War from 1994 to 1996, when it was unable subdue separatists in Russia's Chechnya and the North Caucasus. Internationally, Russia deployed forces to Croatia and Bosnia and Herzegovina for peacekeeping starting from 1992, and to Kosovo from 1999.

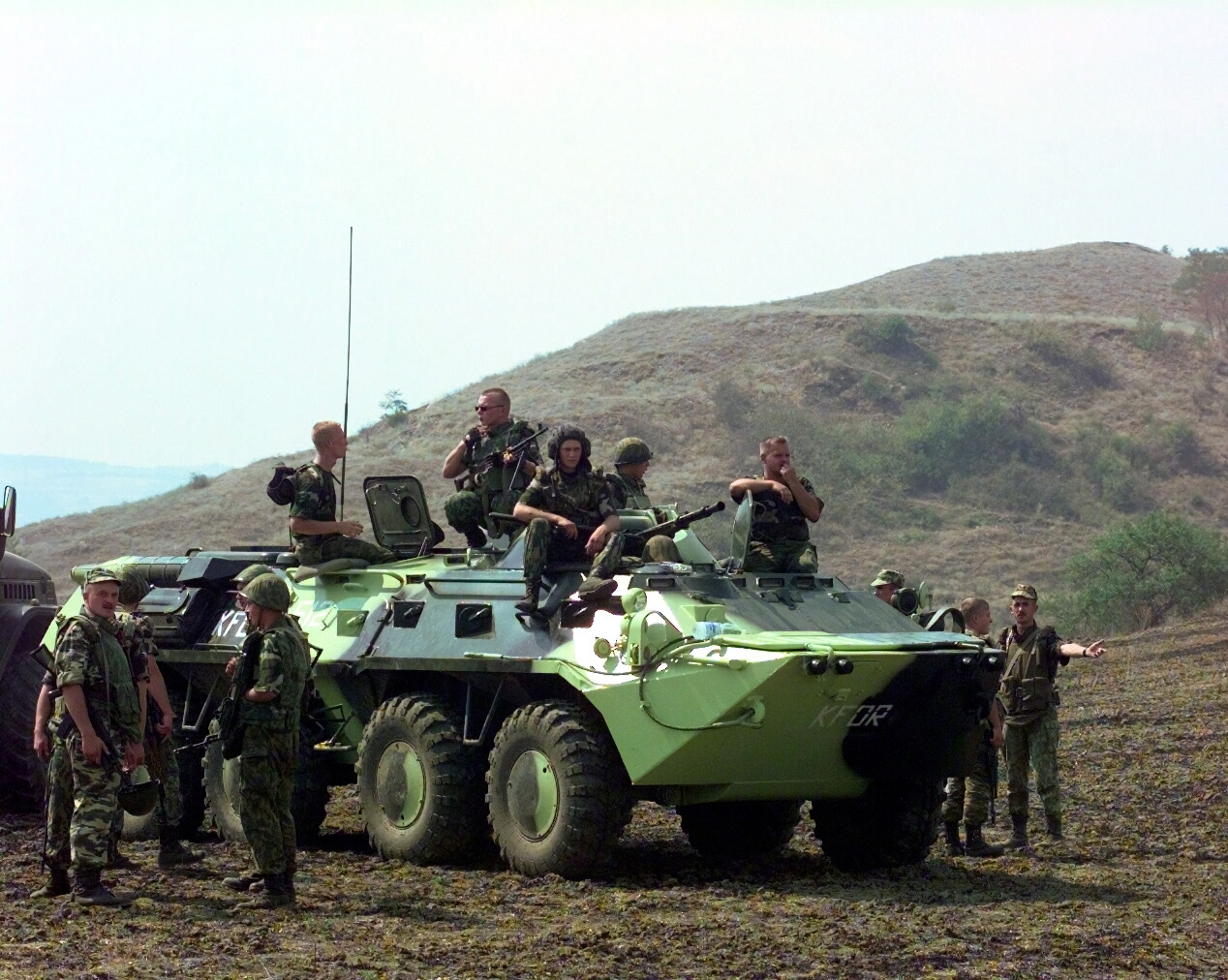
Russian soldiers and a BTR-70 of the Kosovo Force (KFOR) in August 2000.

The Russian Armed Forces inherited the Soviet era mass mobilisation structure, designed to use reservists to fight a major war involving mechanised deep operations. Pavel Grachev, who was the defence minister until 1996, proposed the creation of a fully manned and equipped high-readiness "mobile force" that could be quickly deployed to conflict zones, but this was unsuccessful. What did occur in the second half of the 1990s was the creation of "permanent ready forces," which had better manning and equipment levels, and these were used with success during the Second Chechen War from 1999 to 2004.

The military in the early presidency of Vladimir Putin still largely had the mass mobilisation structure and Soviet era equipment. Under Putin, the Security Council became the dominant institution coordinating national security policy, limiting the influence of the Defence Ministry and General Staff, and creating a more unified command than had existed in the Yeltsin years. The state armaments programme of 2002 recognised that most orders went unfulfilled during the 1990s, and instead prioritised research and development, with procurement of new equipment scheduled to begin after 2008. Corruption is also a significant impediment to the Armed Forces. In January 2008, senior research fellow at the Norwegian Defence Research Establishment Tor Bukkvoll said "The change from Yeltsin to Putin had minimal effect on Russian military corruption. Putin, despite his desire to rebuild Russian strength, has not shown himself willing or able to seriously deal with corruption.″

=== Serdyukov reform (2008–2012) ===
In October 2008, Anatoly Serdyukov, the Minister of Defence from 2007 to 2012, launched the "New Look" military reform, along with the Chief of the General Staff, General Nikolai Makarov. These have been described as "the most radical changes in the Russian military since the creation of the Red Army in 1918" and as "driving the transformation from a conventional mobilization army to a permanently combat-ready force." Previous attempts at major reforms during the 1990s had been largely undermined, with the most notable change being the merger of the Russian Air Defence Forces with the Russian Air Force. The groundwork for the New Look reform was laid by Sergey Ivanov, the Minister of Defence from 2001 to 2007, who called for a reduction in conscripts and officers, and an increase in professional volunteer soldiers. Among the changes that took place from 2008 were the creation of four new military districts from the previous nine, which now had a combat command role in addition to their previous force generation and support function. Most divisions in the Ground Forces were abolished in favour of separate manoeuvre brigades, intended to be fully manned and at a higher state of readiness, and equipped with modernised or new equipment. The Navy received new submarines and small surface combatants, and the Aerospace Forces also benefited from increased investment. Multiple logistical support arms were merged under one command, the Logistical Support of the Russian Armed Forces. Battalion tactical groups, fully manned by enlisted soldiers, were established, though for every two such battalions, there was one manned by conscripts.

=== Rearmament and wars in Syria and Ukraine (2012–2022) ===
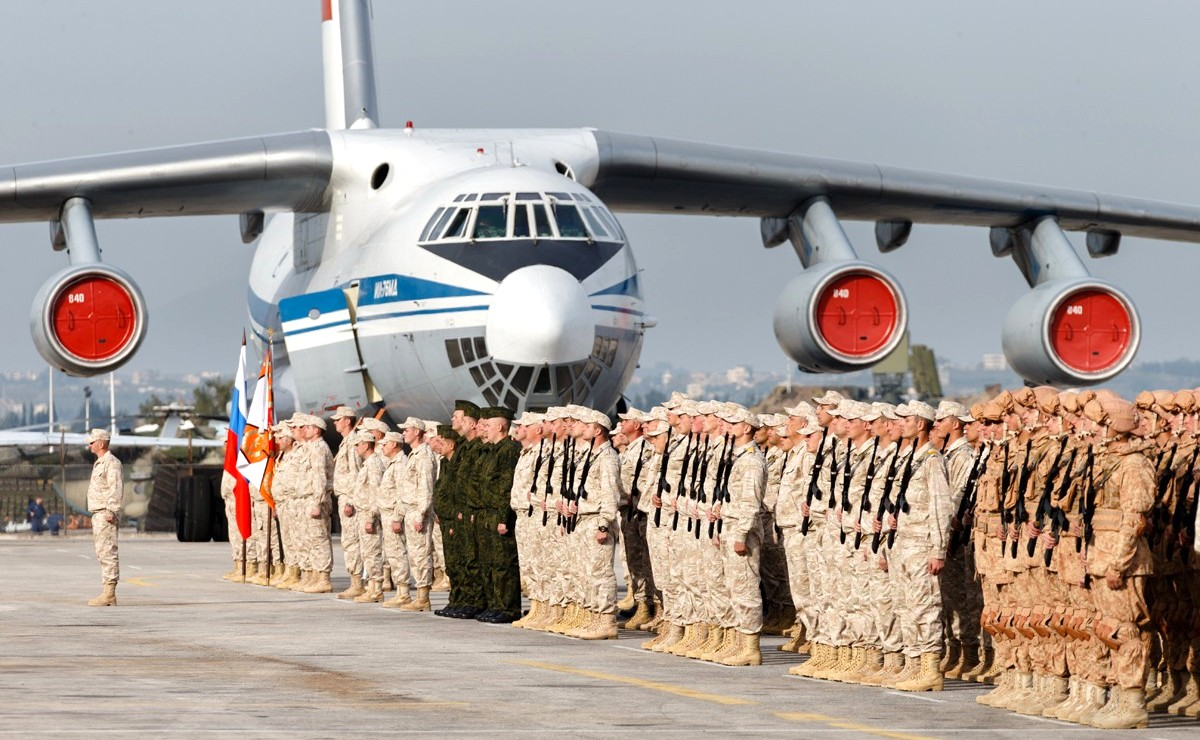
Russian service members at Khmeimim Air Base, the headquarters for the Russian intervention in the Syrian civil war, in December 2017.

The New Look reform during Serdyukov's tenure was controversial among many in the military establishment. After 2012, when Sergey Shoigu and General Valery Gerasimov were appointed as Minister of Defence and Chief of the General Staff, they began to dismantle some of the reforms. Shoigu continued the essence of the reform, including the broad structural and procurement changes, while going back on the more controversial aspects. Some divisions were restored, such as the famed Tamanskaya and Kantemirovskaya divisions, though they were not as large as in the past. Many of the shortcomings that had been revealed in the 2008 Russo-Georgian War were addressed by the reform, as seen during the 2014 Russian annexation of Crimea. In early 2014, Russian special forces, Airborne Forces, and Naval Infantry rapidly took control of Crimea. The Russian military also worked to mobilise, train, and equip pro-Russian separatist forces during the war in Donbass starting in early 2014.

In July 2015, Syria requested military assistance from Russia after advances made by the Islamic State. In August, an agreement was signed between them on the use of Khmeimim Air Base and Tartus naval base by the Russian military, and starting from September, aircraft and warships began arriving. Russian airstrikes began on 30 September 2015. Russian forces assisted the Syrian Arab Armed Forces in the fall of 2015 with offensives in Hama, Homs, and Aleppo regions. After a pause in hostilities for several months, in the summer and fall of 2016 Russia assisted Syria with a series of offensives that retook Aleppo city from the Syrian opposition. Russian forces also assisted in retaking Palmyra from ISIS in March 2016 and again in May 2017, and with a major campaign against ISIS in central Syria, up to the Euphrates river valley, until the end of 2017. A draw down of Russian forces in Syria was announced in November 2017, and it was followed by a decline in operations. In August 2019 it was announced that Russian military flights were "reduced to a minimum and performed only for combat training and reconnaissance". The armed forces gained significant experience during the intervention in the Syrian civil war, which also allowed them to test new equipment and command and control systems. The aircraft carrier Admiral Kuznetsov was used in combat for the first time. As of 2017, over 48,000 personnel had been deployed to Syria, and by 2021, 90% of Aerospace Forces pilots had been rotated through there.

During its intervention in Syria, Russia was accused of committing war crimes alongside the Syrian government forces, including indiscriminate bombing of civilian areas and structures such as hospitals, schools and markets. In one of the incidents, the Independent International Commission of Inquiry on the Syrian Arab Republic described a series of Russian air strikes on a market in the densely populated Maarat al-Numan as a ″double tap″ strike, where after the initial strike, a second bombing wave struck the same target as rescue workers were on the scene, resulting in 43 deaths, including four children, and at least 109 injured civilians.

The main focus of Shoigu and Gerasimov during the 2010s were rearmament and improving coordination between the military, civilian agencies, and the military-industrial complex. Russia spent $66.4 billion on arms in 2015, then $69.2 billion in 2016, surpassing Saudi Arabia to take 3rd place globally (after the U.S. and China). According to the Stockholm International Peace Research Institute, by 2014, Russian exports of major weapons increased by 37 percent.

As of 2020 the Ground Forces were considered "smaller and more capable than they were in the mid-1990s" by the International Institute for Strategic Studies, and the Airborne Forces and reorganised Special Operations Forces were also part of Russia's high-readiness capability. However, after needing to rapidly increase force generation to replace growing losses in the full-scale war with Ukraine, a reform plan announced by Shoigu in December 2022 has been described by some U.S. military observers as the "nail in the coffin" to the 2008 New Look reform. It puts emphasis on mobilisation and the creation of more units manned by both conscripts and contract soldiers, and "essentially recreates the Soviet Armed Forces in the present-day Russian Federation."

=== Russo-Ukrainian war (2022–present) ===
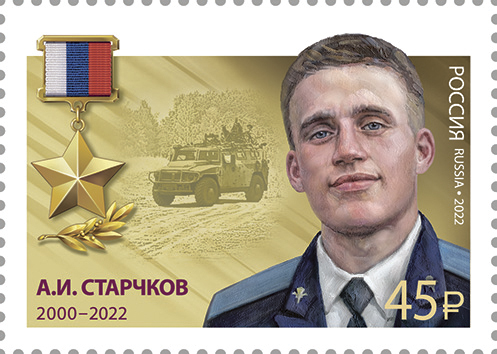
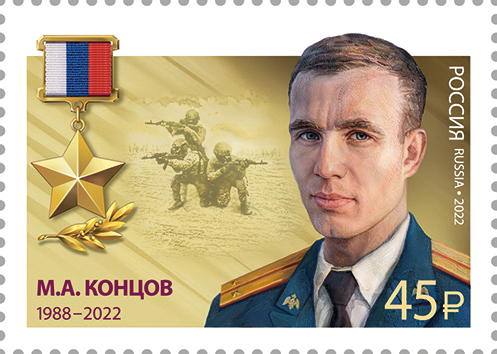
Russian stamps honouring soldiers killed in the Russo-Ukrainian war. As of February 2023, the number of Russian soldiers killed and wounded in Ukraine was estimated at nearly 200,000. As of July 2025, Russian casualties in Ukraine were estimated at 1 million.

On 24 February 2022, Russian president Vladimir Putin gave the execute order to for the Armed Forces to begin the Russian invasion of Ukraine. The Russian General Staff provided five strategic directions to its four groups of forces (Note: A group of forces has permanently assigned Ground Forces field armies or direct-reporting army corps, and is assigned Airborne Forces or Naval Infantry units as needed.) involved in the operation. The directions were Kyiv for the Eastern Group of Forces, which was the main strike; Brovary for the Central group; and Poltava for the Western group. The Southern Group of Forces had two directions: towards Mariupol in Donetsk Oblast, and west of Crimea towards Kherson. After the Kyiv offensive was abandoned in March 2022, the attack toward Mariupol became the main strike. The Southern group was the only one to achieve its initial objectives, outmaneuvering the Armed Forces of Ukraine (AFU) in southern Ukraine and amassing firepower at Mariupol. By May 2022, the Eastern and Central groups were withdrawn and sent to southeast Ukraine after being reconstituted, while the Western group was shifted to the Kharkiv Oblast.

On 10 April 2022 General Aleksandr Dvornikov assumed field command of the operation. However, the General Staff initially led the operation from Moscow, before a separate Joint Group of Forces (temporary operational command) was established in October 2022. In July 2022, at the same time as the Armed Forces began suffering severe casualties, the Ground Forces began to site ammunition in or near structures which are frequented by civilians due to the human shield benefit, ostensibly because Ukrainian HIMARS had tilted the odds of his strategy of attrition by artillery. Within hours after Defence Minister Sergei Shoigu's signature on the UN-brokered deal to resume Ukraine's Black Sea grain exports, Russia bombed the Port of Odesa.

According to Forbes Moscow had committed, as of the end of July 2022, 10 of its Combined Arms Armies to the invasion. The Wagner Group has made a name for itself as Putin's "private army." In late 2022, the newly appointed commander of the Joint Group of Forces in Ukraine, General Sergey Surovikin, decided to use Wagner forces to fix the AFU at Bakhmut while rebuilding Russian military formations in the aftermath of the initial invasion, and Ukraine's successful Kherson and Kharkiv counteroffensives. General Valery Gerasimov, the Chief of the General Staff, assumed command of the Joint Group of Forces on 11 January 2023, and Surovikin became his first deputy. The Russian military held Zaporozhye Oblast during the summer 2023 Ukrainian counteroffensive, after which it regained the initiative in Ukraine.

In June 2023, Putin backed the Ministry of Defence's plan to make mercenary groups sign contracts, which Wagner leader Yevgeny Prigozhin pushed against: these contracts would have placed the Wagner Group under the Ministry's command structure as subordinates and limited Prigozhin's own influence. Later in June, the Wagner Group turned against the Russo-Ukrainian war and the Ministry of Defence until a peace deal was reached. According to Prigozhin, part of the reason for his march against Russia was to stop the government from "[dismantling] PMC Wagner." Russia planned to expand its active personnel to 1.5 million by the end of 2024, which would have made it the second largest active military force after China. In February 2024 the Russian military captured Avdiivka and continued advancing over the rest of the year, despite Ukrainian efforts to halt the advance.

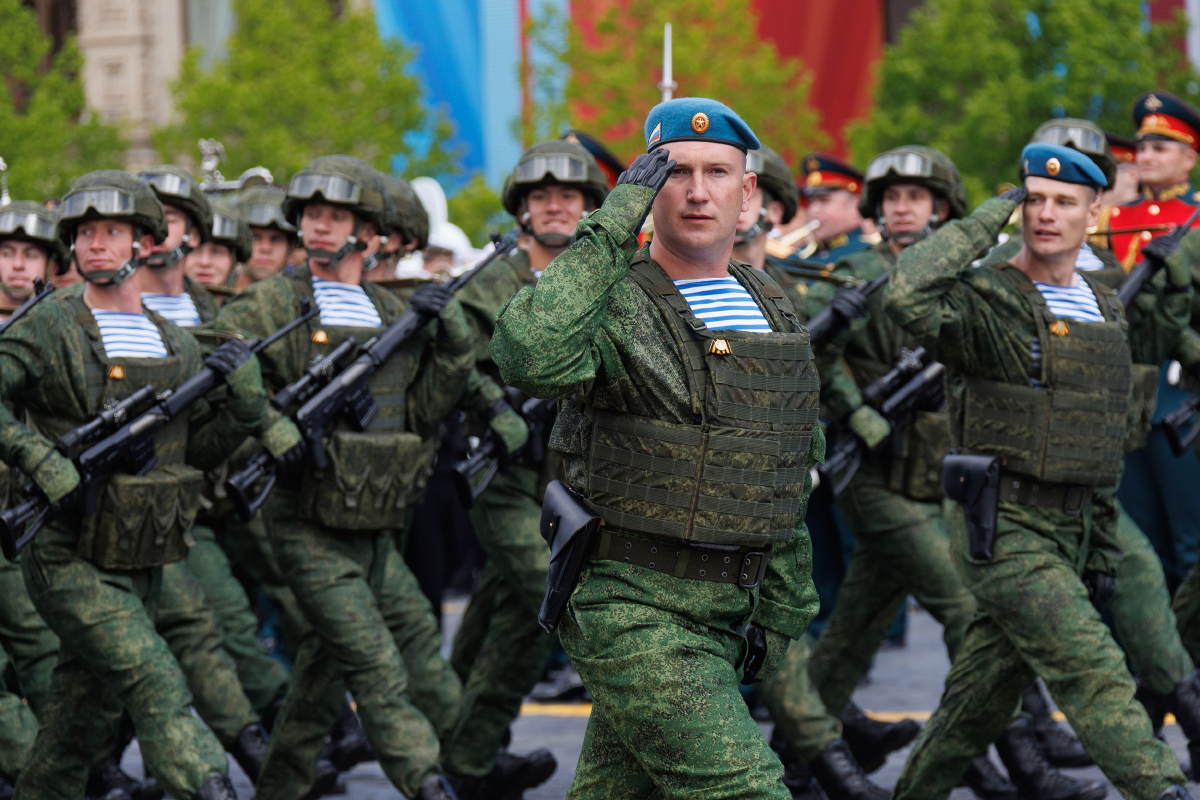
Russian troops marching in the 2024 Moscow Victory Day Parade

By July 2024, U.S. Army General Christopher Cavoli, NATO Supreme Allied Commander Europe said that "[t]he Russians are very cleverly adapting technologically and procedurally to many of the challenges that they run into in Ukraine". Cavoli also said in April 2024 that the Russian military has replaced its troop and equipment losses and is larger than it was before the start of the conflict. On 26 June 2024, the UK-based Royal United Services Institute think tank reported that Russia continues to increase the production and sophistication of its main weapons and its defence industry remained highly dependent on foreign imports of critical components. The Ukrainian Commander-in-Chief Colonel General Oleksandr Syrskyi said on 24 July 2024 that Russians were much better resourced now but also suffer three times higher losses than Ukraine.

According to NATO and Western military officials, approximately 1,200 Russian soldiers were killed or wounded in Ukraine every day on average in May and June 2024. In June 2024, it was estimated that approximately 2% of all Russian men aged 20 to 50 had been killed or seriously wounded in Ukraine since February 2022. As of October 2024, it was estimated that over 600,000 Russian soldiers had been killed or wounded while fighting in Ukraine. Military courts have received thousands of AWOL cases since Russia's 2022 mobilisation. Pro Asyl said in 2024 that at least 250,000 Russian conscripts had fled to other countries since February 2022. After some conscripts had been deployed during the initial invasion in 2022, despite Russian law prohibiting their use outside Russia, Vladimir Putin publicly apologised, and several generals were removed and/or arrested. Conscripts have not been observed in Ukraine since then. Despite Putin's promise that conscripts would not be sent to fight, dozens of conscripts were captured or went missing during the Ukrainian Kursk offensive in 2024 according to Russian news outlet Vyorstka. According to activists and lawyers, there is a legal loophole that allows the combat deployment of conscripts, where after just four months of training, they can sign full volunteer combat contracts, which the conscripts often do not fully understand before singning.

In November 2024, The Telegraph reported that Russia had for the first time issued a manual to soldiers instructing how to dig and maintain mass graves amid growing casualties. Russia's use of mass graves to bury its soldiers has been documented in occupied parts of Ukraine's eastern Donbas region.

In April 2025, Oleksandr Syrskyi said that Russian troops in Ukraine were now 623,000, increased fivefold since the start of the invasion, and they are increasing by 8,000-9,000 soldiers each month. He also said that Russia's overall mobilisation capacity is 20 million people or 5 million people with military training. However, he noted that Russia's advantage in artillery has dropped from 10 to 1 to 2 to 1, mainly because of Ukrainian strikes on Russian ammunition depots.

In June 2025, Secretary General of NATO Mark Rutte said that Russians "are reconstituting themselves at a rapid pace" and produce multiple times more ammunition than whole of NATO, despite having a much smaller economy. Rutte also assessed that Russia could attack NATO territory within three to five years and called on member-states to increase defence spending to 5% of their GDP.

As drone warfare became a central facet of the Russo-Ukrainian war, Russia increased its investment and development in various types of drones. On 12 November 2025, Russia officially created its newest branch: the Unmanned Systems Forces. It was created to centralise the development, deployment, and operational command of unmanned aerial, ground, and naval systems, and for integrating autonomous platforms into existing military structures.

In October 2025, several sources reported that according to an investigation by the exiled news outlet Vyorstka, Russian military commanders have been executing and torturing their own personnel since the first year of the invasion. As part of the investigation, Vyorstka said it had obtained hundreds of accounts of executions, with the incidents evolving from initially being punishments for drunkenness or disobedience in the trenches into killings over personal conflicts or extortion, and identified 101 servicemen accused of carrying them out. Over 12,000 complaints related to abuse has been sent to Russia's Chief Military Prosecutor's Office since the start of the full-scale war, with a particular increase since the second half of 2023. Out of these, only 10 criminal cases have been opened, resulting in five officers being convicted of killing subordinates. According to the investigation, there is an ″unofficial ban″ on investigating field commanders. Russian soldiers speaking to Vyorstka said that the executed personnel were often listed as deserters or as missing in action, while their bodies were buried in forests or left in the battlefield and shot at to imply combats deaths. According to the BBC in February 2026, which published interviews with Russian soldiers on record describing executions, killing your own soldiers is referred to in Russian military slang as ″zeroing″.

According to the Royal United Services Institute, Russia has gained "combat experience" from the Russo-Ukrainian war.

According to an August 2026 report by the Royal United Services Institute, the war in Ukraine has led Russia to shift its doctrine from massive firepower to mass precision strike by significantly expanding its precision strike capabilities in terms of quality, quantity, scale and integration and also to institutionalize its lessons in reconnaissance and targeting and introduce adaptations in a single reinforced command chain, streamlined target acquisition, and the equipment with low-cost and high-tech strike systems. At the same time, Russians have not yet found a comprehensive way to restore the ability to maneuver while precision strikes can only supplement mass artillery fires which are still available at the tactical level.

==== War crimes ====
War crimes committed by the Russian Armed Forces have been documented in several military conflicts, including the Second Chechen War, the Russo-Georgian War, and the Russo-Ukrainian war.

In 2024, the International Criminal Court issued arrest warrants for top Russian military officers Sergei Shoigu, Valery Gerasimov, Sergey Kobylash, and Viktor Sokolov for alleged war crimes of directing attacks against civilians and civilian objects in Ukraine. In May 2025, a UN report concluded that the Russian Armed Forces's recurrent drone attacks on civilians in Kherson amount to war crimes and crimes against humanity.

== Structure ==
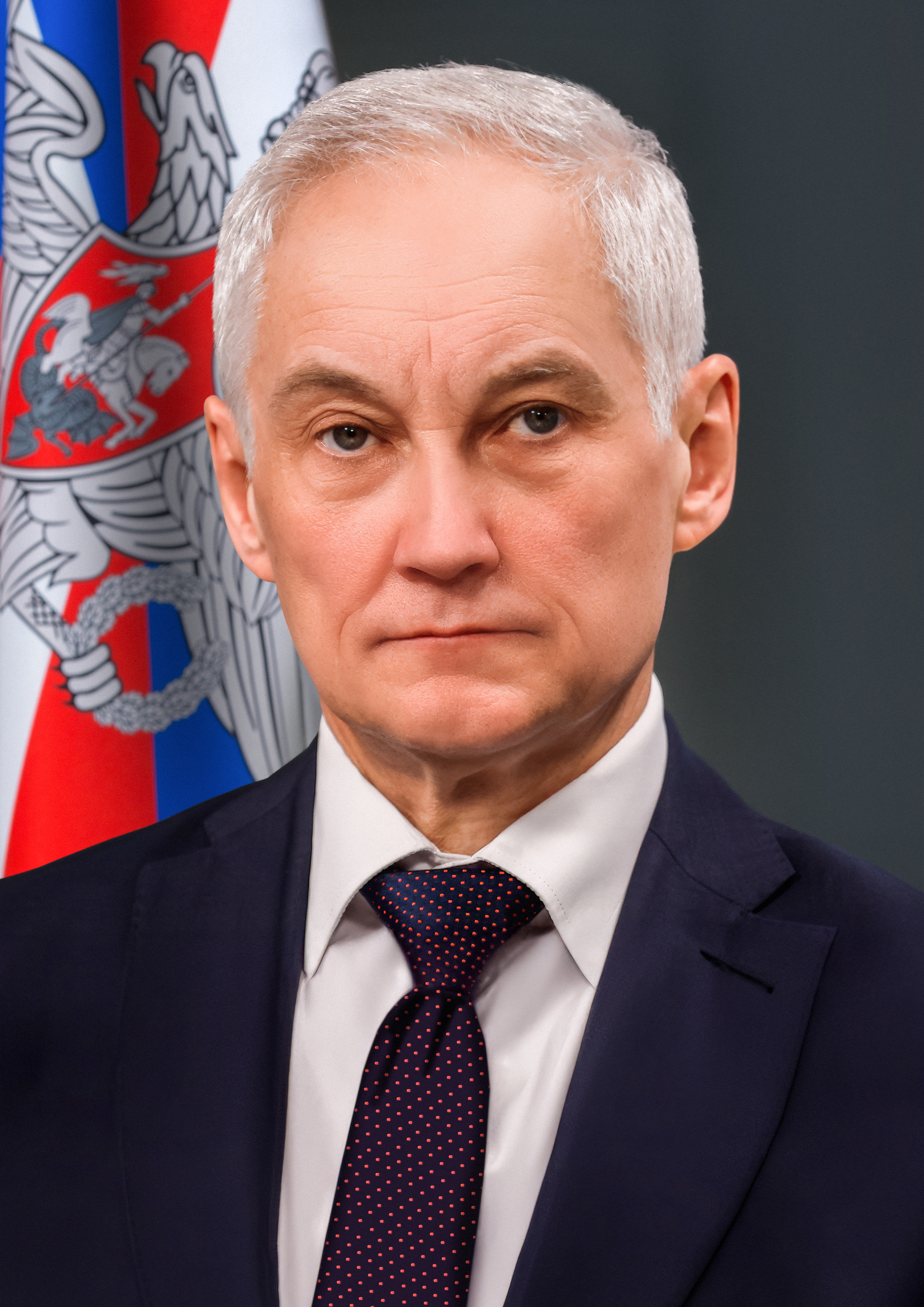
Andrey Belousov
Minister of Defence

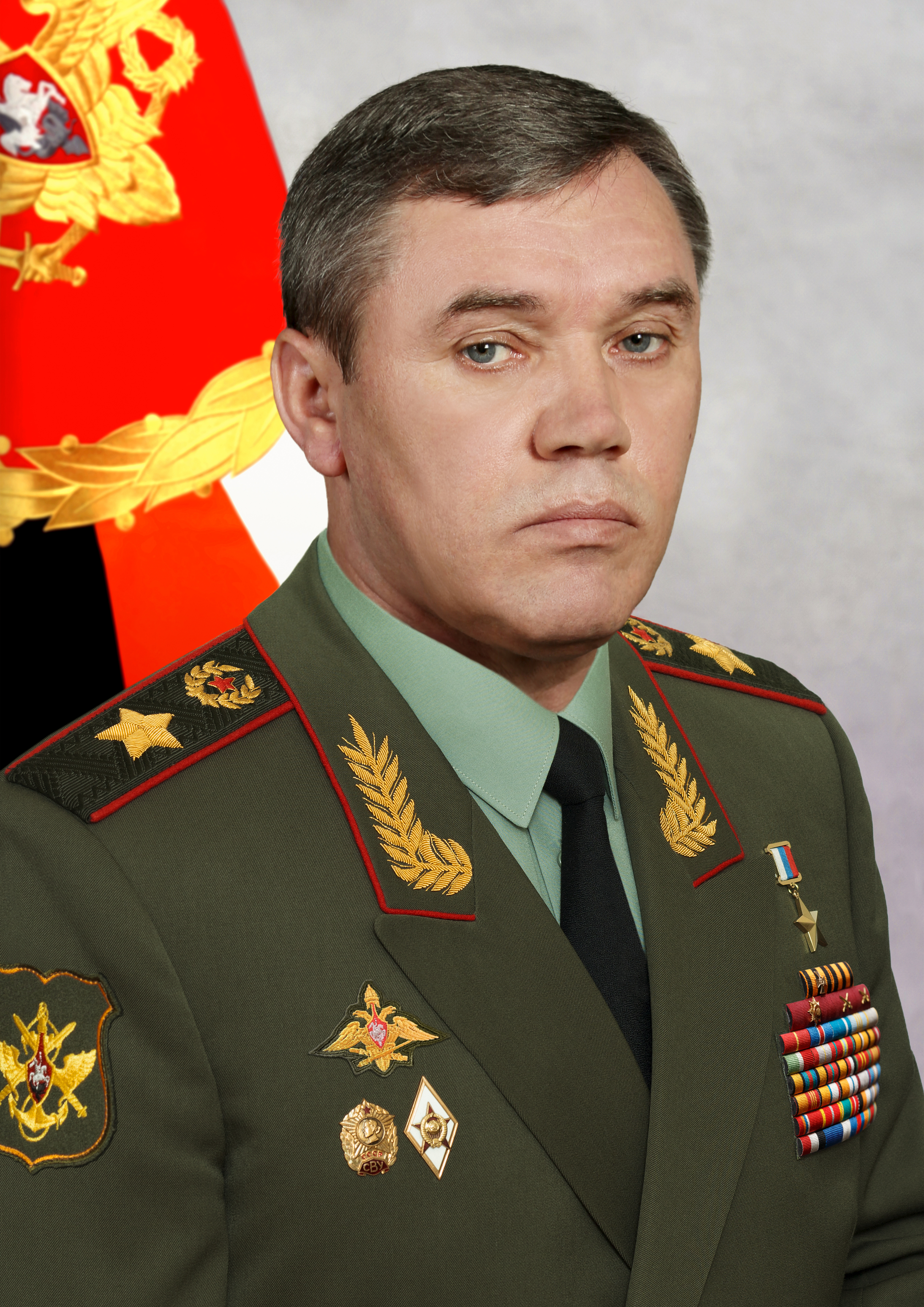
GEN Valery Gerasimov
Chief of the General Staff

The President of Russia is the Supreme Commander-in-Chief of the Armed Forces. The Ministry of Defence of the Russian Federation serves as the administrative body of the Armed Forces, and is responsible for readiness, manpower, and procurement; implementing presidential directives; as well as overseeing and directing the General Staff of the Russian Armed Forces. The General Staff is responsible for studying the threat environment to Russia and developing plans for defending the country and its interests. The National Defense Management Center in Moscow was founded in 2014 and is an important component of the Armed Forces' command and control system.

Compared to the U.S. Joint Chiefs of Staff, the Russian General Staff has a much larger role, which includes operational command over the entire armed forces. It is also responsible for long-term planning, doctrinal development, and equipment procurement. The Chief of the General Staff, in addition to commanding all forces and services, also has inspector general-like powers within the Staff, being responsible for its structure and functions, and is simultaneously a deputy minister of defence.

Notable General Staff departments include the Main Operational Directorate, the largest department, responsible for operational and strategic planning, and the Main Directorate (GU, previously the Main Intelligence Directorate or GRU), responsible for providing information to the military and civilian leadership, while having a degree of autonomy within the General Staff. There are also the Main Directorate of the Military Police (since 2012), the Main Organization and Personnel Directorate, and the Main Communications Directorate, among others. In July 2018, the Main Military-Political Directorate of the Russian Armed Forces was created, restoring a responsibility for ideological training that had been done away with in the Soviet Armed Forces.

=== Service branches ===
The Armed Forces consist of the following:

- The branches of the Armed Forces: (Note: Russian: Вид вооружённых сил) the Ground Forces (SV), Aerospace Forces (VKS), and Navy (VMF)
- The separate arms: (Note: Russian: Род войск) the Strategic Rocket Forces (RVSN), Airborne Forces (VDV), and Unmanned Systems Forces (VBS)
- The special purpose formations: (Note: Russian: Формирования специального назначения) the Special Operations Forces (SSO)
- The special arms: (Note: Russian: Специальные войска) the Logistical Support (MTO)

There are additionally two further separate arms, the National Guard and the Border Service. These retain the legal status of "Armed Forces", while falling outside of the jurisdiction of the General Staff of the Armed Forces of the Russian Federation. The National Guard is formed on the basis of the former Internal Troops of Russia. The new structure has been detached from the Ministry of Internal Affairs into a separate agency, directly subordinated to the President of Russia. The Border Service is a paramilitary organisation of the Federal Security Service, the country's main internal intelligence agency. Both organisations have significant wartime tasks in addition to their main peacetime activities and operate their own land, air and maritime units.

The Armed Forces as a whole are traditionally referred to as "[the] army" (armiya), except in some cases, the Navy is specifically singled out.

=== Military districts, armies, and air armies ===
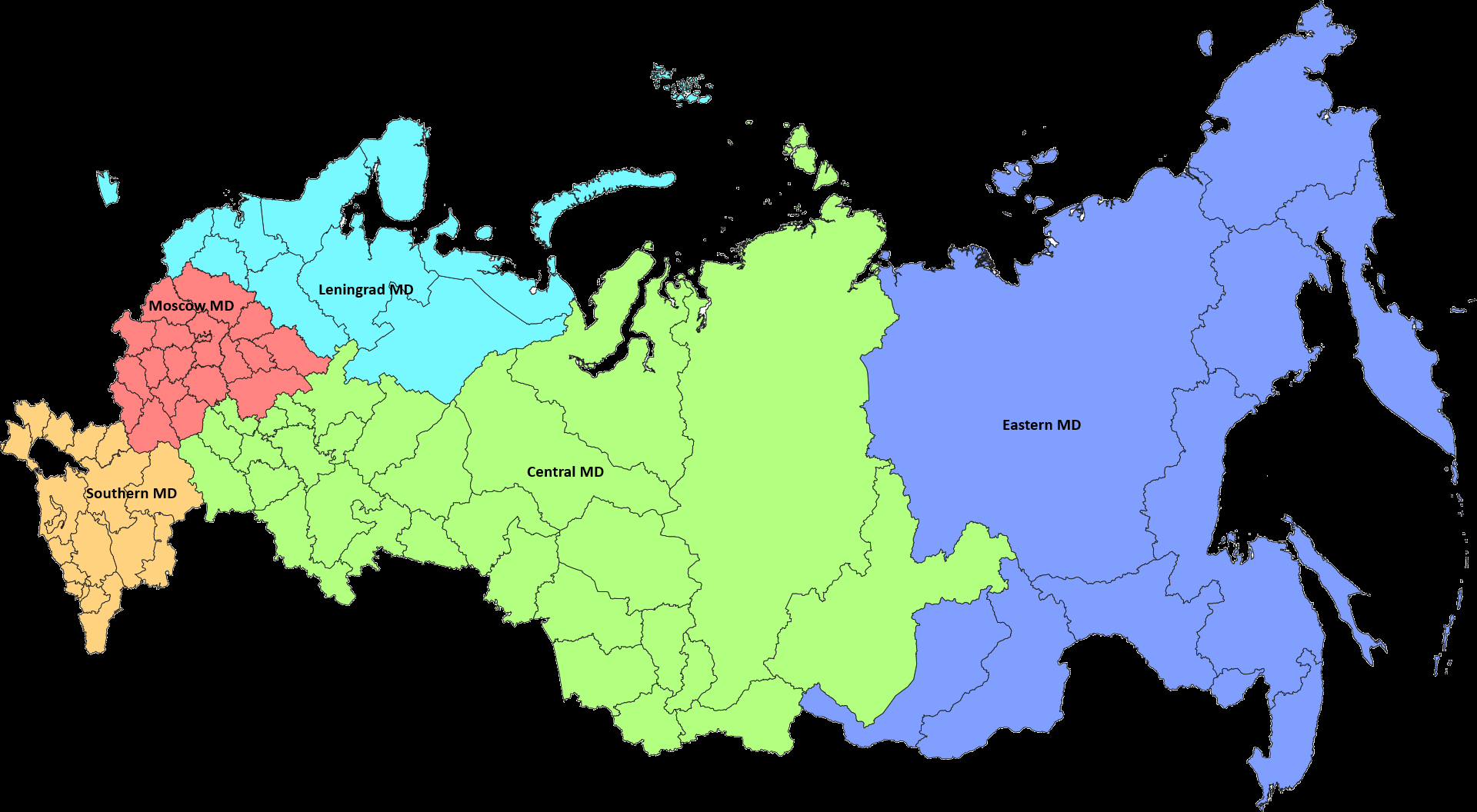
Military districts of Russia as of 2024. Moscow Military District (HQ in Moscow) Leningrad Military District (HQ in St. Petersburg) Southern Military District (HQ in Rostov-on-Don) Central Military District (HQ in Yekaterinburg) Eastern Military District (HQ in Khabarovsk)

There are five military districts: the Moscow Military District, Leningrad Military District, Southern Military District, Central Military District, and Eastern Military District. In 2024, the Western Military District was divided into the Leningrad and Moscow districts, and the military district-level Northern Fleet Joint Strategic Command was dissolved.

In 1992 there were eight districts: Moscow, Leningrad, North Caucausian, Volga, Ural, Transbaikal, Siberian and Far Eastern. The Kaliningrad Special Region was formed in 1997. In 1998, the Transbaikal District was dissolved and its territory was divided between the Siberian and Far East districts. In 2001, the Volga and Ural districts were combined as the Privolzhsk-Ural. In 2010, the existing six districts and the Kaliningrad region were condensed into four districts, which were also joint force commands: the Western, Southern, Central, and Eastern districts. The Northern Fleet Joint Strategic Command was established in 2015.

Military districts in the early Russian Federation inherited their Soviet era "man, train, and equip" function, mainly having the responsibility of logistics and force generation, including conscription and enlistment of contract soldiers. Districts were primarily focused on land forces. Combat command was delegated by the General Staff to the districts' subordinate formations (i.e. field armies). This changed in the 2008 reform, which made each district a joint operational-strategic command (operativno-strategicheskoye komandovaniye; OSK). This makes military districts comparable to a U.S. geographic unified combatant command. They oversee permanent forces from each branch, and attached forces from the Airborne Forces or other arms, sometimes including the GRU. Each military district has a defence management centre that is the regional equivalent of the National Defense Management Center in Moscow, and they are in constant contact.

In wartime, a military district forms a group of forces as needed for an operation. At the start of the 2022 Russo-Ukrainian war, the districts at the time formed the Western, Southern, Central, and Eastern groups of forces, and the district HQ was also the group HQ. In addition, the 102nd Military Base in Armenia, of the former Transcaucasus Group of Forces, is subordinated to the Southern Military District in Rostov-on-Don. The 201st Guards Military Base in Tajikistan is subordinated to the Central Military District in Yekaterinburg. The Operational Group of Russian Forces in Moldova reported to the Western Military District in Saint Petersburg.

Below military districts, the main operational-level formations in the Ground Forces are numbered armies, consisting of 11 combined arms armies and the 1st Guards Tank Army as of 2022. They also have a large tactical role, and during the war in Ukraine the army-level headquarters have sometimes directly commanded battalion tactical groups, bypassing division, brigade, or regiment headquarters. The Aerospace Forces, formed in 2015 by a merger of the Russian Air Force and Aerospace Defence Forces, have an equivalent in the form of air force and air defence armies, and as of 2017 one was attached to each of the four districts. The Ground Forces do not have aircraft, but at the end of 2022 it was announced that each combined arms army will receive aviation brigades; without specifying if these will be owned by the Ground Forces or attached Aerospace Forces units. It has been announced that the assets of the former Western Military District's 6th Air and Air Defence Forces Army will be split among two armies in the new Leningrad and Moscow districts.

=== Navy and naval fleets ===
A map of naval bases, shipyards and spent fuel storage sites operated by the Northern Fleet

The Navy has its headquarters in Saint Petersburg and consists of four fleets and one flotilla. Each fleet and flotilla receives administrative orders and guidance from the Navy headquarters, but is operationally under an OSK, being aligned with a military district. The Baltic Fleet headquartered at Kaliningrad was aligned with the Western district, and now the Leningrad district. The Pacific Fleet headquartered at Vladivostok is aligned with the Eastern district. The Caspian Flotilla headquartered at Astrakhan and the Black Sea Fleet headquartered at Sevastopol are aligned with the Southern district. The Northern Fleet headquartered at Severomorsk was part of a district-level Joint Strategic Command from 2015 to 2024, and is now under the Leningrad district.

The Northern Fleet controls the majority of the naval arm of Russia's nuclear triad, while the Pacific Fleet also has some of it. The Navy is supported by the Russian Naval Aviation, which makes it the only branch of the military to have aircraft besides the Aerospace Forces, and also has the Russian Naval Infantry, which consisted of five brigades before 2022. In 2022 it was announced all five brigades will be expanded into divisions, and in the summer of 2023 a sixth brigade was formed. The Naval Infantry is not intended for forced amphibious landings, but to land in a permissive or semi-permissive environment, after that is established either by some of its organic units or by other ground forces.

Russia has one aircraft carrier which is the Admiral Kuznetsov. The ship has been out of commission and in repairs since 2018. The repair process has been hindered by accidents, embezzlement of funds, and other setbacks.

=== Logistical support ===
The Logistical Support of the Russian Armed Forces (Materialno-tekhnicheskoye obespecheniye or MTO, literally "Material-Technical Support") is the service tasked with sustaining and provisioning the Armed Forces for constant readiness. Russia inherited the former Soviet branches that had this task, the Rear Services and Technical Support, the latter focusing on procurement. During the 2008 reforms, they were combined under one centralised system. The director of the MTO is also concurrently the Deputy Minister of Defence for Logistics. There is an MTO battalion in every Ground Forces maneuver brigade, and at the military district/OSK level, there are MTO and railway brigades, supply depots, and refurbishment plants. There is no "requisition and receive" in the Russian logistics system, but a "pushdown" where a higher unit determines the amount and delivery of supplies based on algorithmic calculations.

The MTO system emphasises the use of existing lines of communication for sustainment, and has railway brigades and pipeline battalions within MTO brigades for this purpose. Departments within the MTO include the Department of Transportation Support, an approximate equivalent of the United States Transportation Command, responsible for coordinating and contracting rail, air, or sea military shipping. Others include the Automobiles and Tanks department and Missile and Artillery department. The Russian rail system is the main strategic and operational lift capability for the armed forces, as the vast majority of personnel and cargo are moved by rail. The Railway Troops within the MTO are tasked with rail preparation, construction, and protection, and are organised in ten separate brigades and two separate battalions.

Reports have suggested that Russia has struggled with logistics following the 2022 full-scale invasion of Ukraine, resulting in issues including malnutrition among Russian troops. In April 2026, The Sunday Times said it had received evidence by Ukrainian intelligence documenting at least five cases of Russian troops engaging in cannibalism. The evidence included voice recordings from November 2025 related to an alleged incident where a Russian soldier was caught trying to eat the leg of one of two comrades he had killed in occupied territory in Donetsk, where the commanding officer of the unit reported the event to his brigade lieutenant. Photograpic evidence was also shared, including of the severed leg, which the Times said was authentic, and sent to a military surgeon, who said it looked like it had been cut with a sharp knife.

== Personnel ==
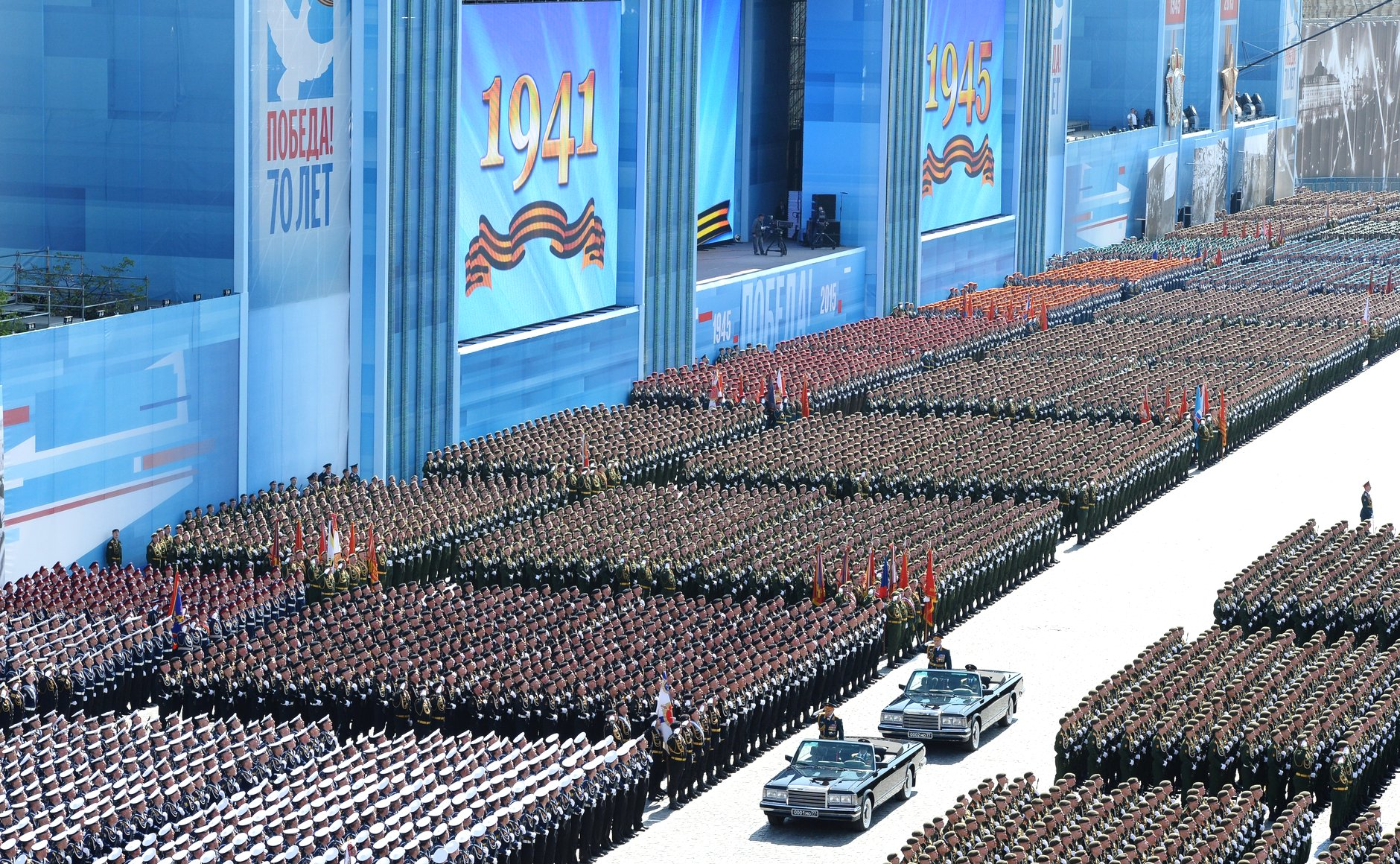
Russian troops at the 2015 Moscow Victory Day parade

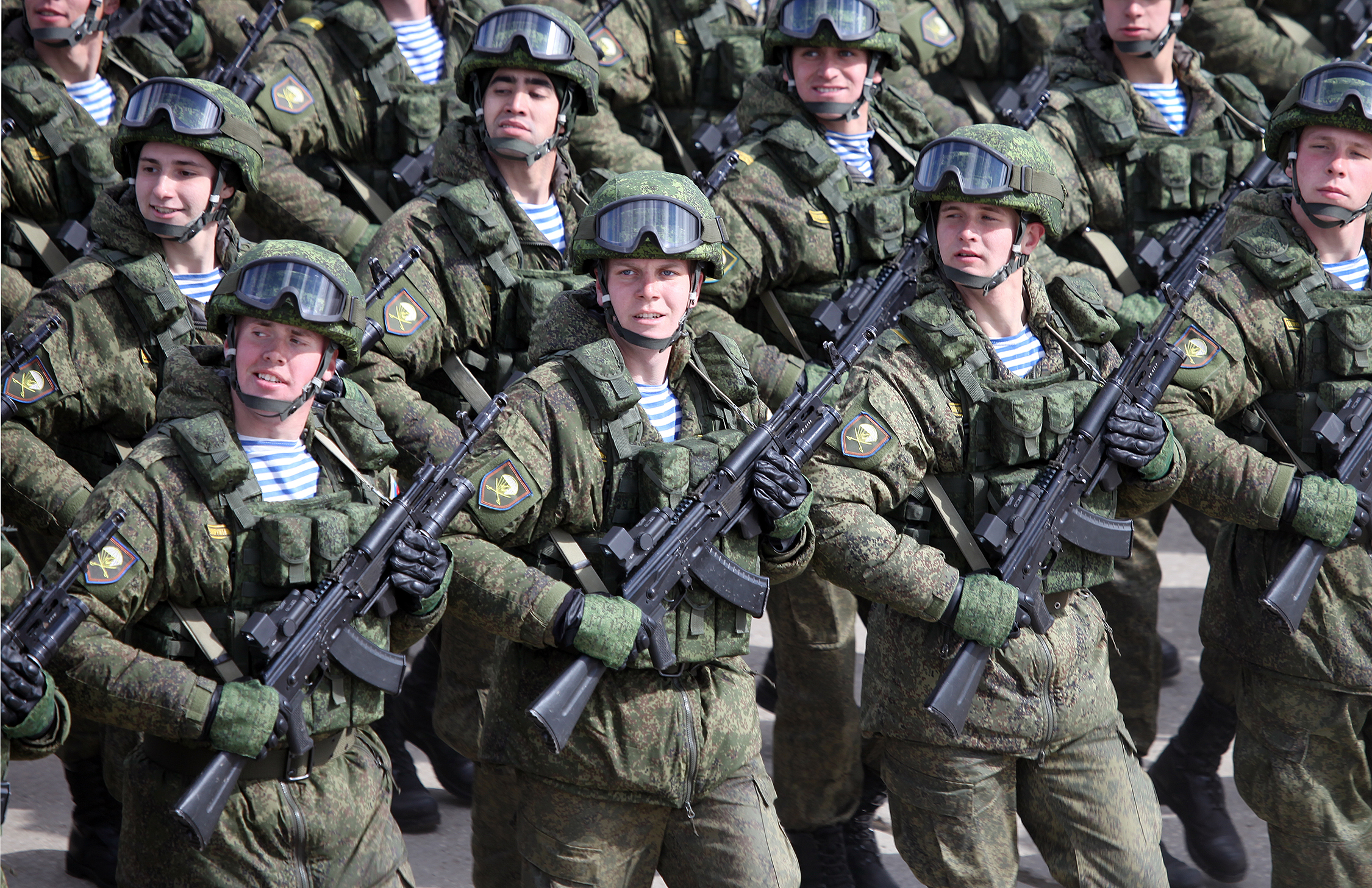
Russian troops marching in the 2015 Moscow Victory Day parade

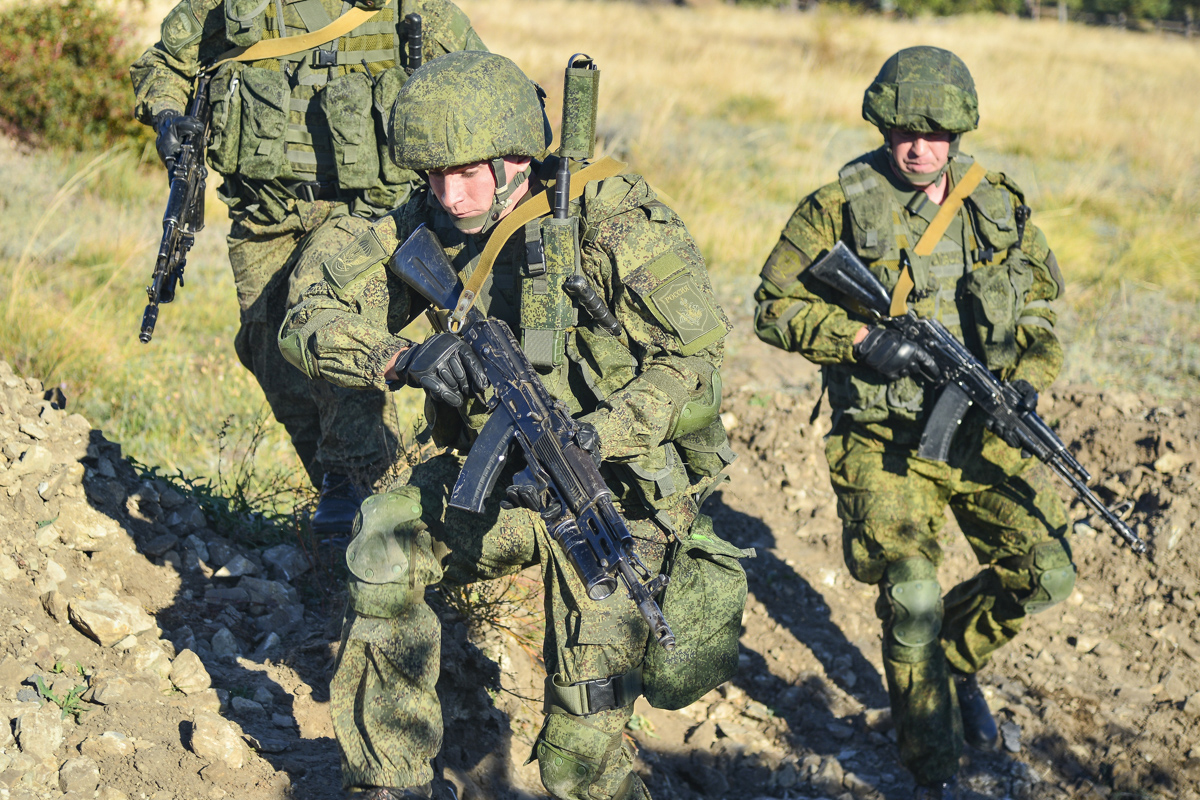
Members of the 56th Guards Air Assault Brigade of the Russian Airborne Forces in 2018

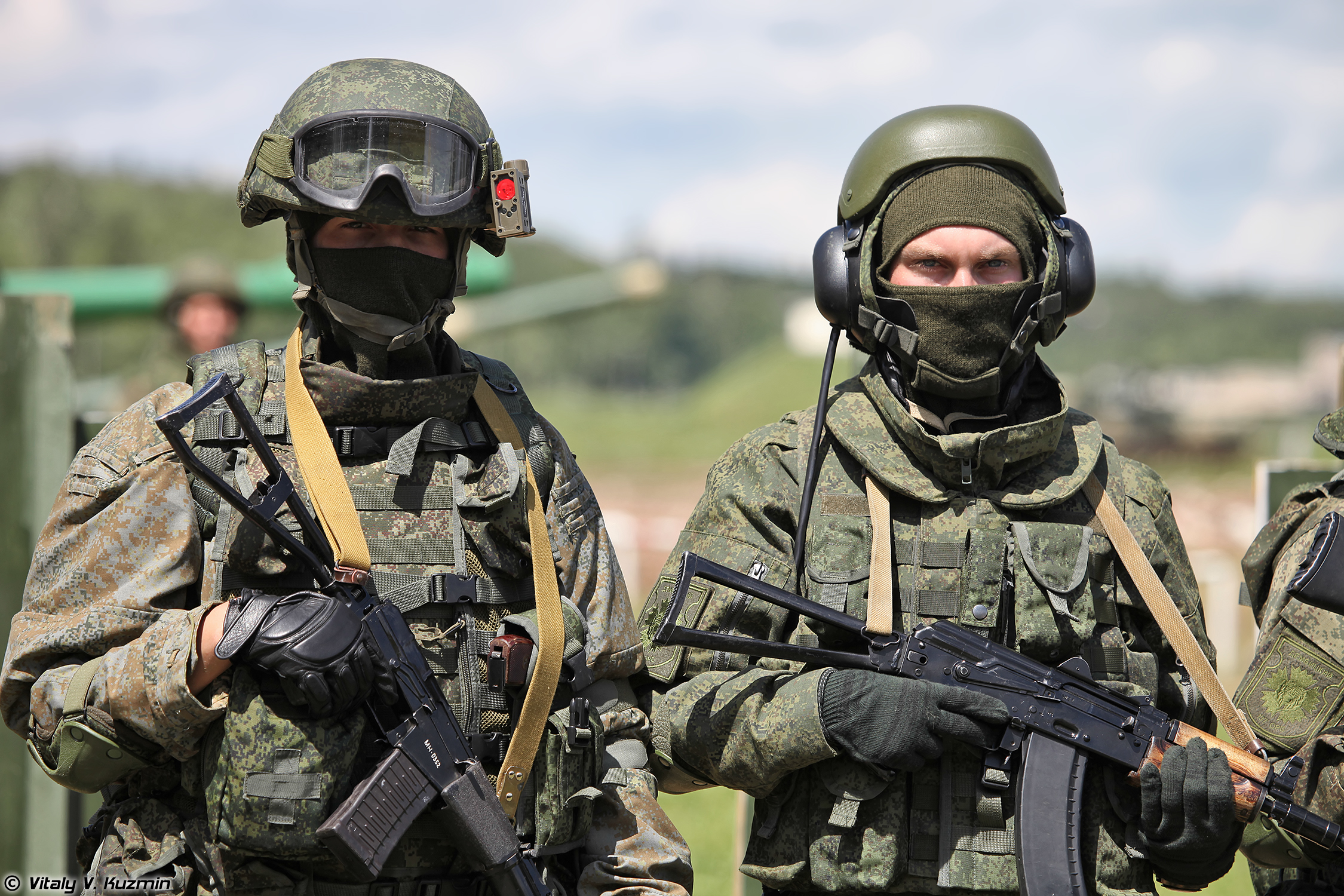
Ratnik infantry combat system in reconnaissance variant and AFV crew individual protection kit Ratnik-ZK

The Russian Armed Forces use a hybrid system consisting of conscription and volunteer service. All male Russian citizens are required to register for conscription at the age of 17, and all men between the ages of 18 and 27 are required to perform twelve months of military service. The service term was originally two years before being reduced to eighteen months in March 2007 and to one year in January 2008. In December 2022 the maximum age of conscription was increased to 30, and it was proposed to restore the original service term of two years. The mandatory retirement age for most ranks of the military is 65, except for colonel generals or admirals and above, for whom it is 70. According to the Ministry of Defence, the armed forces need to maintain a mobilisation reserve to have manning resources capable of reinforcing the permanent readiness forces if they cannot deter or suppress an armed conflict on their own.

The authorised strength of the armed forces is specified by decree of the President of Russia. The armed forces were reduced from the Soviet-era strength of 2.7 million to 2.1 million as of 1994. In 1997, there were 1.6 million personnel, and this was further reduced to about 1 million as of 2000. The 2008 reform reduced officer billets in the armed forces to 220,000, and set a goal of recruiting 425,000 professional contract soldiers by 2017. There were 270,000 conscripts serving each year. In 2010 the military was estimated to have about 1 million active troops, but the Audit Chamber of Russia reported in 2013 that almost a quarter of authorised positions in the military were vacant. Before the start of the 2022 Russo-Ukrainian war, it had an estimated strength of 900,000. The Ministry of Defence has reportedly been recruiting 400,000 to 500,000 soldiers per year during the war. In December 2022 Putin increased the authorised strength from 1.15 million to 1.5 million.

On 28 May 2022, on the background of the ongoing invasion of Ukraine, Vladimir Putin signed the law which removed the upper age limit for signing first contract for the performance of voluntary military service (earlier this limit was 40 years old). Most of the contract soldiers fighting in Ukraine come from poorer sections of the Russian population. Signing bonuses for men who went to fight in Ukraine are more than a full year's salary for many people in Russia. In November 2024, following heavy personnel losses, Russia reduced payments to troops injured in the invasion of Ukraine amidst the Russian government facing increasing war costs due to the large amount of injuries. In June 2025, Ukrainian and Western estimates for Russian military casualties in Ukraine surpassed one million. In January 2026, NATO Secretary General Mark Rutte said that up to 25,000 Russian soldiers were being killed per month, referring to the losses as ″unsustainable″.

In April 2026, Russian human right groups said there was an increase in reports of intoxicated men being allegedly tricked or pressurized into signing contracts with the military, as using monetary tools for recruitment was becoming more difficult, causing recruiters to struggle with meeting quotas.

=== Women ===
In 2013, it was reported that: "Compared to 2007, the number of female officers and warrant-officers has dropped by nearly two thirds. There were over 30,000 women serving under a contract [with the armed forces] in 2007, and now there are only slightly more than 11,000 of them, including 4,300 officers of various rank." Lt. Col. Yelena Stepanova, the chief of the social processes monitoring department at the Russian armed forces' sociological research center, said. This trend [was] "not ..special" but correspond[ed] with the general .. reduction of the Russian armed forces."

Women serving in the Russian military have reported being treated as ″field wives″, experiencing harassment, abuse, and discrimination, a phenomenon that was also present in Soviet military culture. It is believed by Valentina Melnikova, a member of the banned Union of the Committees of Soldiers' Mothers of Russia, that most women that are victims of abuse are unwilling to report it. According to Maksim Arzamstsev, a professor in Saint Petersburg, a quarter of women in the Russian military have experienced abuse or sexual harrasment.

=== Foreign personnel ===
Recruitment into the Russian military has also been open to non-Russian citizens of the Commonwealth of Independent States, of which Russia is the largest member. By December 2003, the Russian parliament had approved a law in principle to permit the Armed Forces to employ foreign nationals on contract by offering them Russian citizenship after several years service yet, up to 2010, foreigners could only serve in Russia's armed forces after getting a Russian passport. Under a 2010 Defence Ministry plan, foreigners without dual citizenship would be able to sign up for five-year contracts and will be eligible for Russian citizenship after serving three years. On 20 September 2022 the State Duma passed a bill which would make Russian citizenship available to foreign soldiers upon 12 months service in the AFRF; previously the service requirement had been set at three years.

Media has reported that to increase manpower amid casualties in the Russo-Ukrainian war, the Russian Armed Forces has increasingly turned to foreign recruits, many coming from countries across Africa, the Middle East, and South and East Asia according to the Los Angeles Times. According to the Ukrainian Coordination Headquarters for the Treatment of Prisoners of War, nearly 200 foreigners from 37 countries were being held as prisoners of war in October 2025 after being captured while fighting for Russia in the war. Ukrainian Defense Intelligence said that five times as many non-Russian soldiers were captured by Ukraine in 2024 than in 2023, and twice as many as in 2024 had been captured by September 2025.

France24 cited experts saying that Russia is drawing on men from the Indian subcontinent to boost their manpower; for example, researcher Yohann Michel described foreign soldiers being used expendably to reveal Ukrainian positions. India has confirmed at least 44 Indian citizens were serving in Russian units as of November 2025, with several having died in combat. In May 2024, the Indian Central Bureau of Investigation said it had arrested four people linked to a human trafficking network that sent men to fight for the Russian Armed Forces in Ukraine. Some Indian and Nepalese men and their families have said that they were promised non-combat "helper" roles in the military, but were sent to the front line; others allege that they were promised civilian employment or were in Russia as tourists or students, but were deceived and coerced into joining the military. The Indian government has raised this issue repeatedly, and observers cited by Channel News Asia named protections against forced recruitment of Indians as a significant issue that would have to be addressed in a potential agreement on labour mobility between India and Russia.

Men from African countries have also been recruited into the Russian military. Kenya said in November 2025 that more than 200 Kenyans were fighting for Russia in Ukraine; in the same month, Kenyan President William Ruto thanked Ukrainian President Volodymyr Zelenskyy for assisting in the release of Kenyans deceived into joining the Russian military. In September 2025, Kenyan police raided houses in southern Kenya and rescued 22 people about to be trafficked to Russia; witnesses said they had not known that they would be recruited into Russia's military. Kenyan state prosecutor Kennedy Amwayi said in December 2025 that Kenya's Directorate of Criminal Investigations was investigating an "organised, transnational criminal network" that worked with people in Russia and tricked Kenyans into joining the war. Botswana also said two men had been tricked into fighting for Russia. 17 South African men have also alleged that they were deceived into joining the Russian military through a job recruitment scam; Duduzile Zuma-Sambudla, daughter of former South African President Jacob Zuma, resigned as a member of parliament after she was accused of involvement in the scam. In March 2026, the Kenyan and Russian governments agreed that the Russian Defence Ministry would no longer recruit Kenyans, and that Russia would stop deploying Kenyans to fight in Ukraine.

In January 2026, The Daily Telegraph reported that in a recent survey of over 10,000 Russian soldiers captured by Ukraine, 7% had been found to be foreign mercenaries from 40 different countries. The Telegraph compared Russia's tactics in recruiting foreigners to human trafficking, and said Russia used recruiters in African countries who were already part of migrant labour trafficking.

Danish researcher Karen Philippa Larsen, who specialises in Russian private military companies and has spoken to foreign soldiers captured by Ukraine, divided foreign fighters for Russia into three categories: mercenaries who knowingly chose to fight; people who knew they would sign a contract with the Russian Defence Ministry, but believed they would be working in security or logistics; and people who believed they were joining civilian employment, such as jobs as technicians or in agriculture.

In March 2026, the European Parliament adopted a resolution condemning Russia's "trafficking and coercive recruitment" of foreigners into its military, including Africans, South and Central Asians, and Cubans. The resolution described recruitment networks that target people from poor regions with "false promises of employment, education or citizenship", luring them to travel to Russia only to confiscate their documents and force them into the military. The resolution also stated that "state-linked companies, intermediaries, military structures and embassy officials" were involved, and that recruited Africans were "treated as expendable" and given "the most dangerous frontline duties".

=== Military education ===
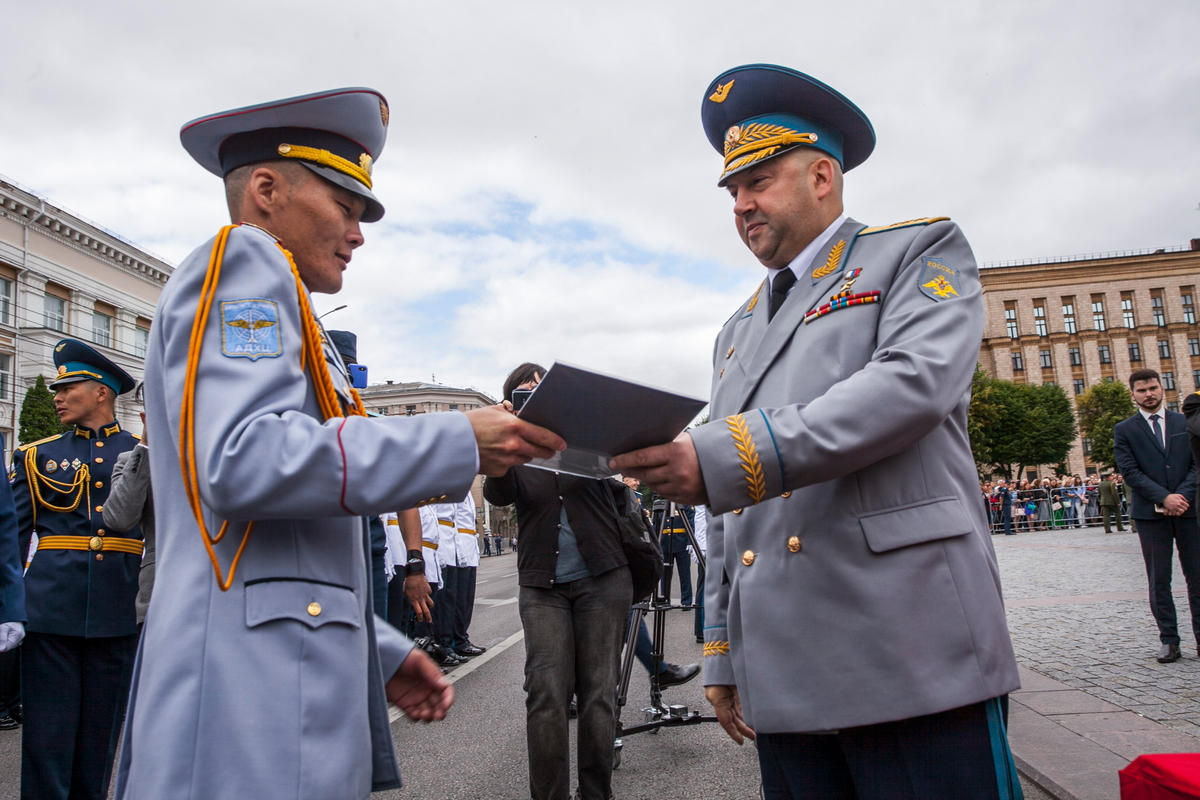
Release of officers of the Air Force Academy in Voronezh

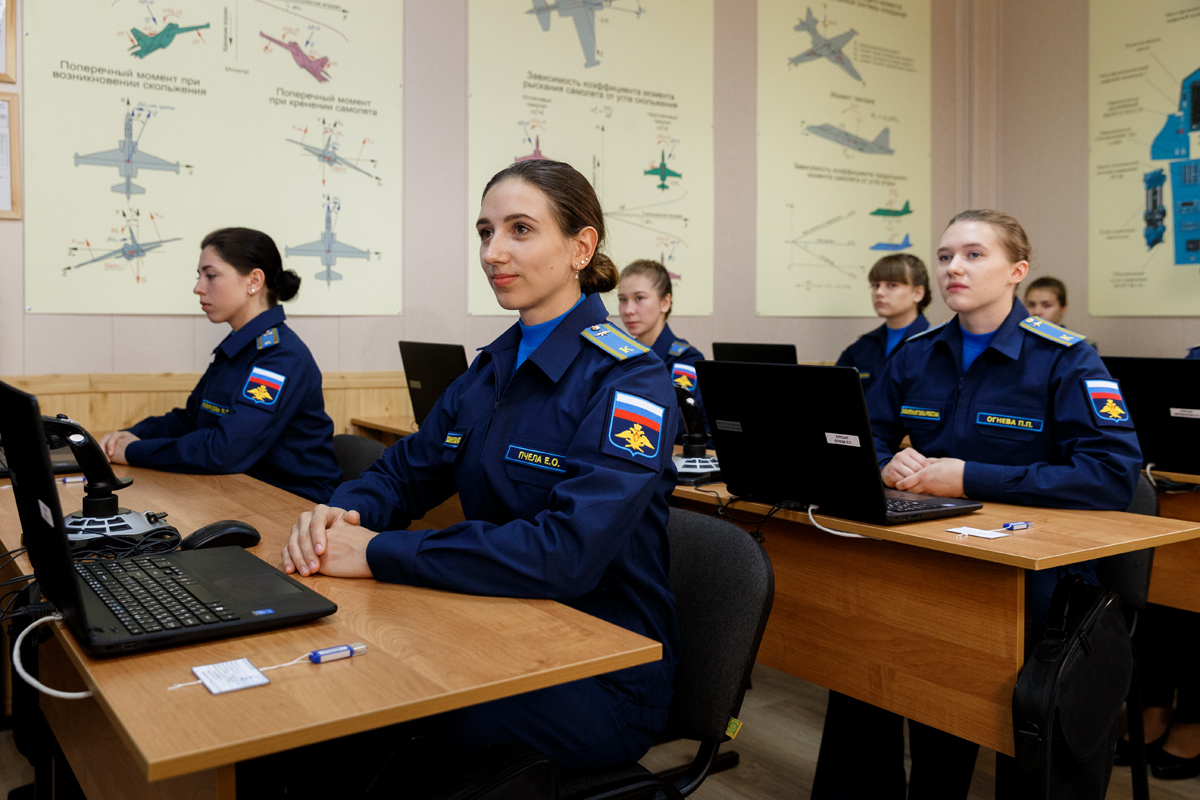
Female students of the Krasnodar Higher Military Aviation School of Pilots

The Russian military education system, inherited from the Soviet Union, trains officer-specialists in narrowly defined military occupational specialties at military schools. In this it differs greatly from the American military education system in which newly qualified second lieutenants receive particular specialties in the framework of their "career branch" only after graduation from a military academy or the ROTC.

The upper age limit for a military officer commissioning school is 22, for an active-duty officer programme at a training centre it is 24, and for a reserve officer training programme it is 30. After at least seven years of service on active-duty, an officer at the rank of major or captain 3rd rank can attend a military academy. After graduating and serving at least another five years, an officer at the rank of colonel or captain 1st rank can attend the Russian General Staff Academy.

The Russian military education system includes:

- Warrant officer schools, which prepare career warrant officers for active duty service.
- Higher military schools, which prepare career commissioned officers for active duty service as platoon/company commanders and at equivalent positions (tactical level).
- Military training centres within civilian institutions of higher education, which prepare reserve commissioned officers who can serve as platoon/company commanders and at equivalent positions (tactical level).
- Military academies, which improve the military occupational specialty knowledge of commissioned officers to allow them to be appointed to battalion/regiment/brigade commander or equivalent positions (operational-tactical level).
- Military Academy of the General Staff of the Armed Forces of Russia, which improves skills of officers graduated from military academies to allow them to become highest-ranking military officers (strategic level).
- Adjunctura is a military analogue of civilian graduate school, which allow commissioned officers to get academic degree of candidate of sciences in military oriented specialties and be appointed to a teaching positions in military academies, military schools, military training centres.

== Reserve components ==
Russian Armed Forces have reserves (Russian: запас; transliteration: zapas) which includes 2 components:

- Active reserve – Mobilisation human reserve (Russian: мобилизационный людской резерв; transliteration: mobilizatsionnyy lyudskoy reserv)
- Inactive reserve – Mobilisation human resource (Russian: мобилизационный людской ресурс; transliteration: mobilizatsionnyy lyudskoy resurs)

By default, at the end of active duty each military personnel is enrolled as a mobilisation human resource. This applies equally to conscripts and volunteers regardless of ranks. Furthermore, graduates of civilian institutions of higher education, who have graduated the military training centres of their almae matres, trained under reserve officer programme, are enrolled as mobilisation Human Resources after their promotion to officer's rank (unlike graduates of such centres, trained under active duty officer programme, who are due to be enrolled for active duty after their promotion to officer's rank). Mobilisation human resource are replenished with males who reach the age of 27 years old and were not in military service for any reason.

Enrolling in the mobilisation human reserve is voluntary and implies the special contract. This possibility is available for each persons, who is in the mobilisation human resource already. The initial contract is concluded for 3 years period. Military personnel of mobilisation human reserve (reservists) perform part-time duties in military units. Reservists are appointed to a military position in particular military units and are involved in all operational, mobilisation, and combat activities of these military units. As a rule, in peacetime time reservists perform their duties 2–3 days per month and during an annual military camp training of 20 to 30 days.

The exact number of reservists is unknown because a relevant paragraph of the Presidential Decree which determines the number of reserve troops is classified. The military units manned by reservists are determined by General Staff of the Armed Forces of the Russian Federation, and this information is classified too.

The persons who are in mobilisation human resource (non-reservists) may be enlisted to military camp trainings in peacetime. The duration of each training can not exceed 2 months, herewith the total duration of such trainings for the entire period of being in mobilisation human resource can not exceed 12 months, and a person may be enlisted in such training no more than once every three years.

As of 2009, the number of citizens who can be used for mobilisation deployment on an involuntary basis in the case of wartime mobilisation was estimated at 31 million.

Reservists are subject to mobilisation in wartime first of all. Non-reservists are subject to mobilisation secondarily. The mobilisation of non-reservists is carried out by taking into account the age category under the article 53 of Federal Law of 28 March 1998, No.53-FZ "About military duty and military service": in order from first category to third category.

The first category includes: 1) the persons at the any military rank below that of a commissioned officer (enlisted personnel) and not reached the age of 35 years old; 2) the persons at the any rank from junior lieutenant to captain (captain-lieutenant in naval service) inclusively (junior commissioned officers) and not reached the age of 50 years old; 3) the persons at the any rank from major (captain 3rd rank in naval service) to lieutenant colonel (captain 2nd rank in naval service) inclusively and not reached the age of 55 years old; 4) the persons at the rank of colonel (captain 1st rank in naval service) and not reached the age of 60 years old; 5) the persons at the rank of major general (counter admiral in naval service) or higher (supreme officers) and not reached the age of 65 years old.

The second category includes: 1) enlisted personnel in age from 35 but less than 45; 2) junior commissioned officers in the age from 50 but less than 55; 3) commissioned officers at the any rank from major (captain 3rd rank in naval service) to lieutenant colonel (captain 2nd rank in naval service) inclusively in the age from 55 but less than 60; 4) commissioned officers at the rank of colonel (captain 1st rank in naval service) in the age from 60 but less than 65; 5) supreme officers in age from 65 but less than 70.

The third category includes: 1) enlisted personnel in the age from 45 but less than 50; 2) junior commissioned officers in the age from 55 but less than 60; 3) commissioned officers at the any rank from major (captain 3rd rank in naval service) to lieutenant colonel (captain 2nd rank in naval service) inclusively in the age from 60 but less than 65; 4) all females in the age less than 45 for enlisted personnel and less than 50 for commissioned officers. The person who has reached the age limit, established for the third category (the second category for persons at the rank of colonel (captain 1st rank in naval service) or higher), is retired and is not subject to mobilisation.

Age limits in the reserve component of Russian Armed Forces (males)
Military rank	Mobilisation human reserve		Mobilisation human resource		
Military rank	Age limit for signing first contract	Age limit for tenure	First grade Age limit	Second grade Age limit	Third grade Age limit
Marshal of the Russian Federation	—	—	65	70	—
Army general/Admiral of the fleet	—	—	65	70	—
Colonel general/Admiral	—	—	65	70	—
Lieutenant general/Vice admiral	—	—	65	70	—
Major general/Counter admiral	—	—	65	70	—
Colonel/Captain 1st rank	57	65	60	65	—
Lieutenant colonel/Captain 2nd rank	52	60	55	60	65
Major/Captain 3rd rank	52	60	55	60	65
Captain/Captain lieutenant	47	55	50	55	60
Senior lieutenant	47	55	50	55	60
Lieutenant	47	55	50	55	60
Junior lieutenant	47	55	50	55	60
Senior praporshchik/Senior michman	42	45	35	45	50
Praporshchik/Michman	42	45	35	45	50
Starshina/Chief ship starshina	42	45	35	45	50
Senior sergeant/Chief starshina	42	45	35	45	50
Sergeant/Starshina 1st class	42	45	35	45	50
Junior sergeant/Starshina 2nd class	42	45	35	45	50
Gefreiter/Senior seaman	42	45	35	45	50
Private/Seaman	42	45	35	45	50

Age limits in the reserve component of Russian Armed Forces (females)
Military rank	Mobilisation human reserve		Mobilisation human resource		
Military rank	Age limit for signing first contract	Age limit for tenure	First grade Age limit	Second grade Age limit	Third grade Age limit
Marshal of the Russian Federation	—	—	—	—	50
Army general/Admiral of the fleet	—	—	—	—	50
Colonel general/Admiral	—	—	—	—	50
Lieutenant general/Vice admiral	—	—	—	—	50
Major general/Counter admiral	—	—	—	—	50
Colonel/Captain 1st rank	47	50	—	—	50
Lieutenant colonel/Captain 2nd rank	47	50	—	—	50
Major/Captain 3rd rank	47	50	—	—	50
Captain/Captain lieutenant	47	50	—	—	50
Senior lieutenant	47	50	—	—	50
Lieutenant	47	50	—	—	50
Junior lieutenant	47	50	—	—	50
Senior praporshchik/Senior michman	42	45	—	—	45
Praporshchik/Michman	42	45	—	—	45
Starshina/Chief ship starshina	42	45	—	—	45
Senior sergeant/Chief starshina	42	45	—	—	45
Sergeant/Starshina 1st class	42	45	—	—	45
Junior sergeant/Starshina 2nd class	42	45	—	—	45
Gefreiter/Senior seaman	42	45	—	—	45
Private/Seaman	42	45	—	—	45

=== 2005–2008 reform of the reserve officer training system ===
The reserve officer training system, inherited from the Soviet Union, involved selective conscription of graduates of civilian institutions of higher education, who have graduated the military departments of their almae matres and received a commission as an officer. Such person could be conscripted from the reserve of armed forces to active duty, up until the age of 27. The period of active duty of such an officer was several years, and at the end of that period he was due to be enlisted in the reserve of armed forces again. Such officers were called "blazers" in the army's slang (for example, Anatoly Kvashnin was a "blazer").

In 2005, Minister of Defence Sergei Ivanov announced a significant reduction in the number of military departments carrying out the training commissioned officers from students of civilian institutions of higher education. By March 2008, 168 of 235 civilian universities, academies and institutions which previously had military departments had lost these units. 37 of 67 civilian universities, academies and institutions which retained military departments became the basis for the establishment of new military training centres. The military training centres focused on training officers for active duty, whilst the military departments focused on training officers for the reserve.

In 2006 the conscription of reserve officers was abolished. Graduates of military departments were not subject to conscription to active duty anymore (with the exception of a wartime mobilisation). All graduates of military training centres were due to be enrolled for 3 years active duty upon their university graduation.

=== 2018 beginning of formation of voluntary military reserve force ===
In 2018, Russia started a full-scale formation of a military reserve force based upon volunteers selected from among those who retired from active duty. The Russian military reserve force (Russian: мобилизационный людской резерв, romanised: mobilizatsionny lyudskoy rezerv) is a set of citizens who have signed a contract to perform military service as a reservist. They are appointed to a military position in a particular military unit. They are involved in all operational, mobilisation, and combat activities of these military units, unlike other citizens who have not signed such contracts and who can be used for a mobilisation deployment of armed forces on an involuntary basis only in cases stipulated by law.

The deployment of military units composed of reservists, takes minimum time and does not requires any retraining of military personnel. The military units composed of reservists use the same weapons as used by military units, composed of active duty military personnel. Military units staffed by reservists are 100% manned up to wartime standards just like military units staffed by active duty military personnel only. There is no possibility to define by military units designation what we're dealing with - reserve or not reserve military unit. The number of reservists is not presented in open sources and is not among the number of active duty military volunteers which is published by Ministry of Defence. This makes it difficult for establish real troop strength of new Russian military units and formations.

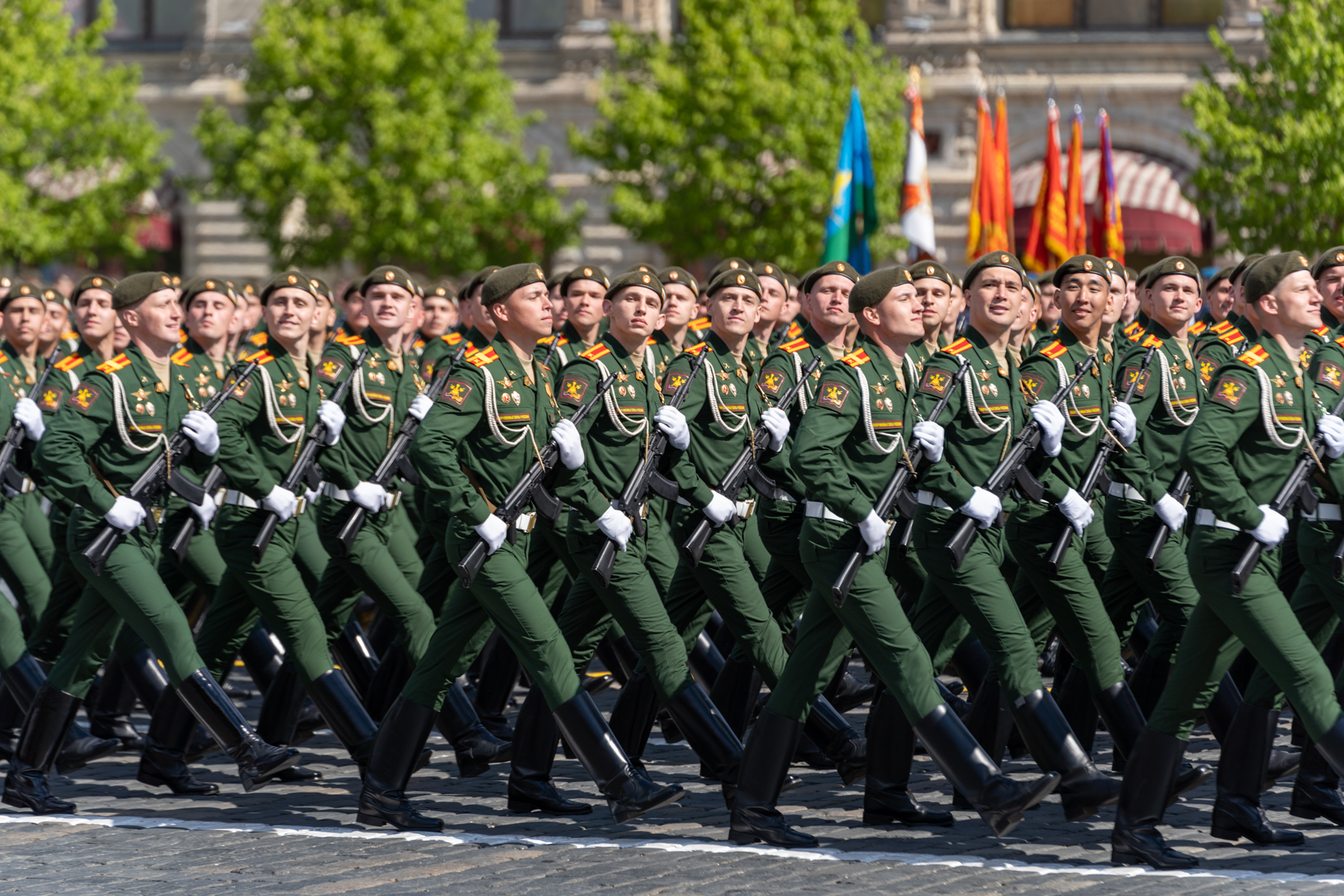
Russian troops in May 2023

=== 2019 reform of the reserve officer training system ===
In 2018 the military departments and the military training centres were abolished. From that moment on, students of civilian institutions of higher education were trained under both officers training programmes (for reserve and for active duty) in the Military Training Centres. In 2019, there were training military centres in 93 civilian institutions of higher education.

=== Mobilisation ===
The first mobilisation of citizens being in mobilisation human resource, conducted on a compulsory basis, in the Russian Federation's history was announced by Presidential Decree of 21 September 2022 No.647 during the Russian invasion of Ukraine. Russia began the 2022 invasion with an active-duty force based on volunteer enlisted soldiers that proved to be too small, and mobilised 300,000 members of its equivalent of the U.S. military's Individual Ready Reserve, consisting of former conscripts, enlisted soldiers, and officers with service from as far back as the 1990s.

== Budget ==
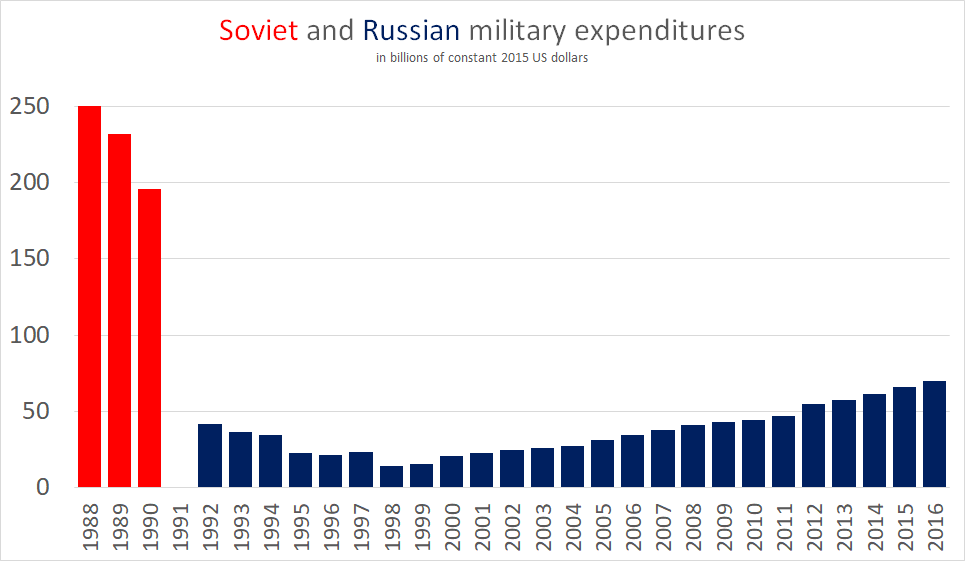
Soviet and Russian military expenditures in billions of 2015 US dollars

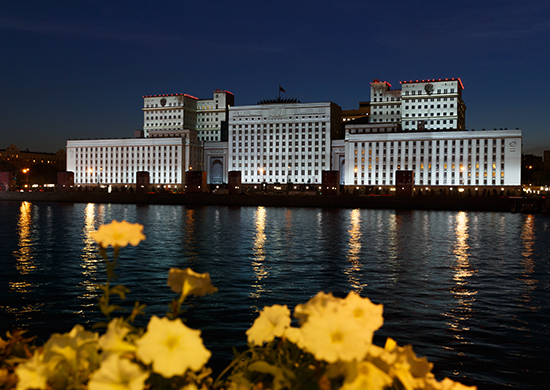
The facade of the National Defense Management Center

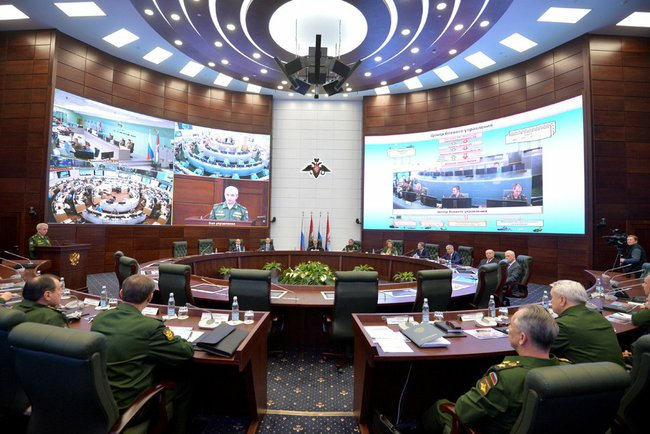
The conference room of the National Defense Management Center

Between 1991 and 1997 newly independent Russia's defence spending fell by a factor of eight in real prices. In 1998, when Russia experienced a severe financial crisis, its military expenditure in real terms reached its lowest point—barely one-quarter of the USSR's in 1991, and two-fifths of the level of 1992, the first year of Russia's independent existence.

In the early 2000s, defence spending increased by at least a minimum of one-third year-on-year, leading to overall defence expenditure almost quadrupling over the past six years, and according to Finance Minister Alexei Kudrin, this rate is to be sustained through 2010. Official government military spending for 2005 was US$32.4 billion, though various sources, have estimated Russia's military expenditures to be considerably higher than the reported amount.

Estimating Russian military expenditure is beset with difficulty; the annual IISS Military Balance has underscored the problem numerous times within its section on Russia. The IISS Military Balance comments, "By simple observation ... [the military budget] would appear to be lower than is suggested by the size of the armed forces or the structure of the military–industrial complex, and thus neither of the figures is particularly useful for comparative analysis." By some estimates, overall Russian defence expenditure is now at the second highest in the world after the USA. According to Alexander Kanshin, Chairman of the Public Chamber of Russia on affairs of veterans, military personnel, and their families, the Russian military is losing up to US$13 billion to corruption every year.

On 16 September 2008 Russian Prime Minister Vladimir Putin announced that in 2009, Russia's defence budget would be increased to a record amount of $50 billion.

On 16 February 2009 Russia's deputy defence minister said state defence contracts would not be subject to cuts this year despite the ongoing financial crisis, and that there would be no decrease in 2009. The budget would still be 1.376 trillion rubles and in the current exchange rates this would amount to $41.5 billion.

Later in February 2009, due to the world financial crisis, the Russian Parliament's Defence Committee stated that the Russian defence budget would instead be slashed by 15 percent, from $40 billion to $34 billion, with further cuts to come. On 5 May 2009, First Deputy Prime Minister Sergei Ivanov said that the defence budget for 2009 will be 1.3 trillion rubles (US$39.4 billion). 322 billion rubles are allocated to purchase weapons, and the rest of the fund will be spent on construction, fuel storage and food supply.

According to the head of the Defence Committee of the State Duma Vladimir Komoyedov, Russia planned to spend 101.15 billion rubles on nuclear weapons in 2013–2015. "The budget provisions under 'The Nuclear Weapons Complex' section in 2013-2015 will amount to 29.28 billion rubles, 33.3 billion rubles and 38.57 billion rubles respectively," Komoyedov said, Vechernaya Moskva reports.

Komoyedov added that in 2012 the spending on nuclear weapons made up 27.4 billion rubles. The draft law "On the Federal Budget for 2013 and for the planning period of 2014 and 2015" will be discussed in the first reading on 19 October 2012, The Voice of Russia reports.

The Russian government's published 2014 military budget is about 2.49 trillion rubles (approximately US$69.3 billion), the fourth largest in the world behind the US, China and Saudi Arabia. The official budget is set to rise to 3.03 trillion rubles (approximately US$83.7 billion) in 2015, and 3.36 trillion rubles (approximately US$93.9 billion) in 2016. As of 2014, Russia's military budget is higher than any other European nation, and approximately 1/7th (14 percent) of the US military budget.

In 2015, SIPRI found that Russia was the world's second biggest exporter of major weapons for the period 2010–14, increasing exports by 37 per cent. India, China and Algeria accounted for almost 60 percent of total Russian exports. Asia and Oceania received 66 percent of Russian arms exports in 2010–14, Africa 12 percent and the Middle East 10 percent.

In 2017, Russia was reported to have slashed its defence spending by 20%, due to calls by Vladimir Putin to spend money on other initiatives such as healthcare and education. The cut decreased Russia's military spending to $66.3 billion, in which Russia slumped to being the fourth-highest military spender. Russia's 2019 defence budget was US$48 billion and the 2020 figure was $61.7 billion.

However, due to the Russian invasion of Ukraine on 24 February 2022, the Russian government has dramatically increased military spending to over 85+ billion dollars, returning to third position as the highest military spender in the world. The increase in military spending was needed to recoup losses in the war and reorient Russia into a war economy. On 5 October 2023, Vladimir Putin stated that Russia's spending on defence and security now equals to 6% of its GDP.

=== Procurement ===
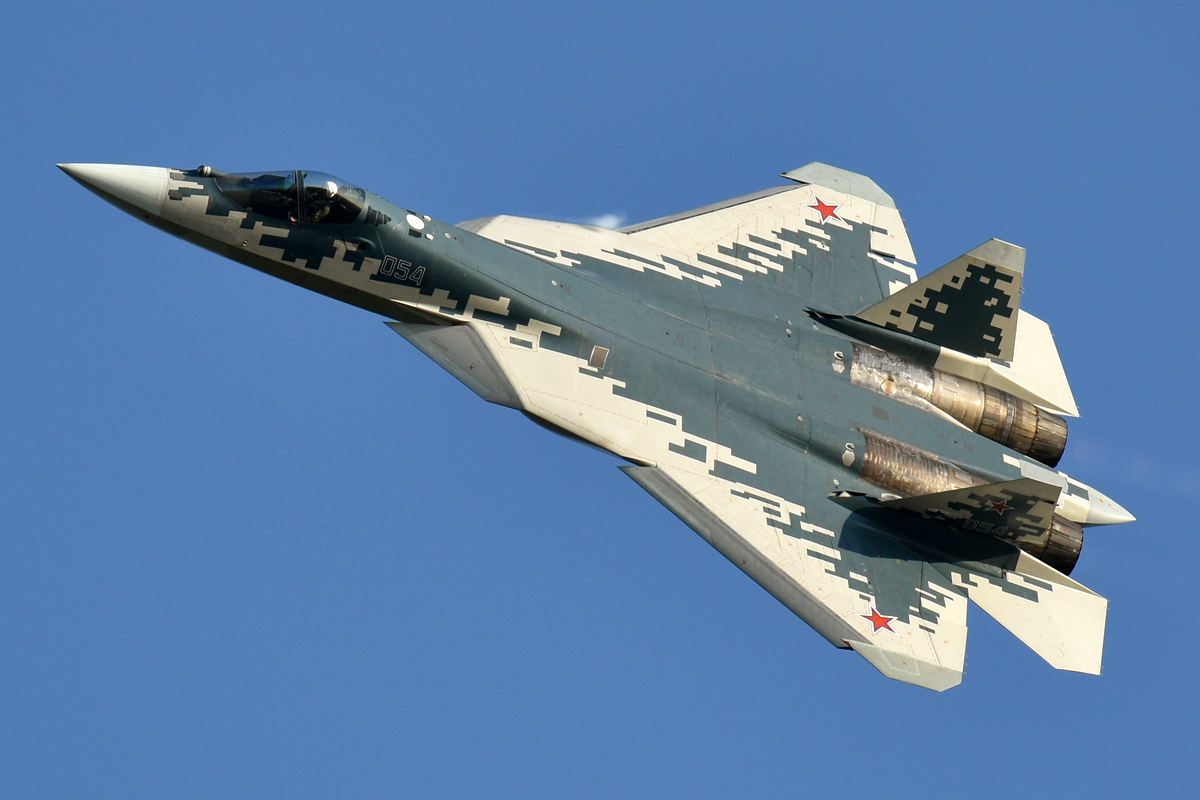
The Sukhoi PAK FA is one of the latest procurement projects of the Russian Armed Forces.

About 70 percent of the former Soviet Union's defence industries are located in the Russian Federation. Many defence firms have been privatised; some have developed significant partnerships with firms in other countries.

The recent steps towards modernisation of the Armed Forces have been made possible by Russia's economic resurgence based on oil and gas revenues as well a strengthening of its own domestic market. Currently the military is in the middle of a major equipment upgrade, with the government in the process of spending about $200 billion (what equals to about $400 billion in PPP dollars) on development and production of military equipment between 2006 and 2015 under the State Armament Programme for 2007–2015 (GPV – госпрограмма вооружения).

Mainly as a result of lessons learned during the Russo-Georgian War, the State Armament Programme for 2011–2020 was launched in December 2010. Prime Minister Putin announced that 20–21.5 trillion rubles (over $650 billion) will be allocated to purchase new hardware in the next 10 years. The aim is to have a growth of 30% of modern equipment in the army, navy and air force by 2015, and of 70% by 2020. In some categories, the proportion of new weapon systems will reach 80% or even 100%.

As of 2011, Russia's chief military prosecutor said that 20 percent of the defence budget was being stolen or defrauded yearly. It is suspected that equipment is not properly maintained due to the resulting lack of funds, which may have contributed to equipment failures observed during the 2022 invasion of Ukraine.

In 2018, RF Armed Forces adopted 35 types of weapons and military equipment and completed state tests of 21 more. The Russian Ministry of Defence (MoD) was procured the YeSU TZ (Yedinaya Sistema Upravleniya Takticheskogo Zvena) battlefield management system that same year. The YeSU TZ battlefield management system incorporates 11 subsystems that control artillery, electronic warfare systems, ground vehicles, air defence assets, engineering equipment, and logistics support, among other things.

Twelve missile regiments have been rearmed with Yars ICBMs, 10 missile brigades with Iskander tactical ballistic missile systems, 13 aviation regiments with MiG-31BM, Su-35S, Su-30SM, and Su-34 combat aircraft, three army aviation brigades and six helicopter regiments with Mi-28N and Ka-52 combat helicopters, 20 surface-to-air missile (SAM) regiments with S-400 Triumf SAM systems, 23 batteries with Pantsir-S self-propelled anti-aircraft gun-missile systems, and 17 batteries with Bal and Bastion mobile coastal defence missile systems [MCDMSs] since 2012 and as of March 2019.

In early 2023, there were reports that the Russian Defence Ministry purchased more than a thousand tablets with a domestic software for higher-ranking officials and also begun receiving a new line of gliding bombs with a range of tens of kilometres.

The New York Times reported on 13 September 2023, citing US and European officials, that Russia overcomes the international sanctions and its missile production now exceeded pre-war levels. It was also reported that Russia now produces more ammunitions than the United States and Europe and it can manufacture 200 tanks and two million units of ammunition in a year. CNN also reported in September 2023 that Russia produces ammunition seven times cheaper and eight times faster than Europe.

In September 2023, various Russian regions launched the production of suicide drones at their own initiatives. Vladimir Putin also claimed that the production of main armoured vehicles has increased by four times in comparison with the past year and the production of the especially important destruction means by three times.

According to the Russian Ministry of Defence, the Russian Armed Forces received in 2023 several hundreds of thousands of small arms, new and repaired weapon systems, military vehicles and equipment, artillery systems, air defence systems, missiles and bombs, aircraft and helicopters, drones, and also over a million individual armour protection and equipment means. CNN reported on 11 March 2024 that Russia currently produces about 250,000 artillery shells a month or about 3 million a year which is nearly three times the quantity the US and Europe produce for Ukraine. CNN cited Western intelligence officials and also said that Russia imports ammunition from Iran and North Korea.

In April 2025, General Christopher Cavoli said before the US Senate Armed Services Committee that Russia is replacing its extensive battlefield losses of equipment and munitions at an "unprecedented rate" due to the expansion of industrial capabilities and the transition to a war economy. He also said that North Korea is providing Moscow with "millions" of artillery shells, missiles and weapons systems while Iran provided it with 400 short-range ballistic missiles, hundreds of thousands of artillery shells, thousands of kamikaze drones and the licenses and technology to produce thousands more of such drones inside Russia. Despite this, equipment shortages due to losses in Ukraine led to many reports in early 2025 about Russian soldiers using unconventional measures like donkeys, horses, and civilian cars for transport and assaults. The Russian Minister of Defence, Andrey Belousov, said in August 2025 that the Russian Army had been supplied with 22,750 motorcycles, quad bikes and buggies since the beginning of the year.

== Nuclear weapons ==
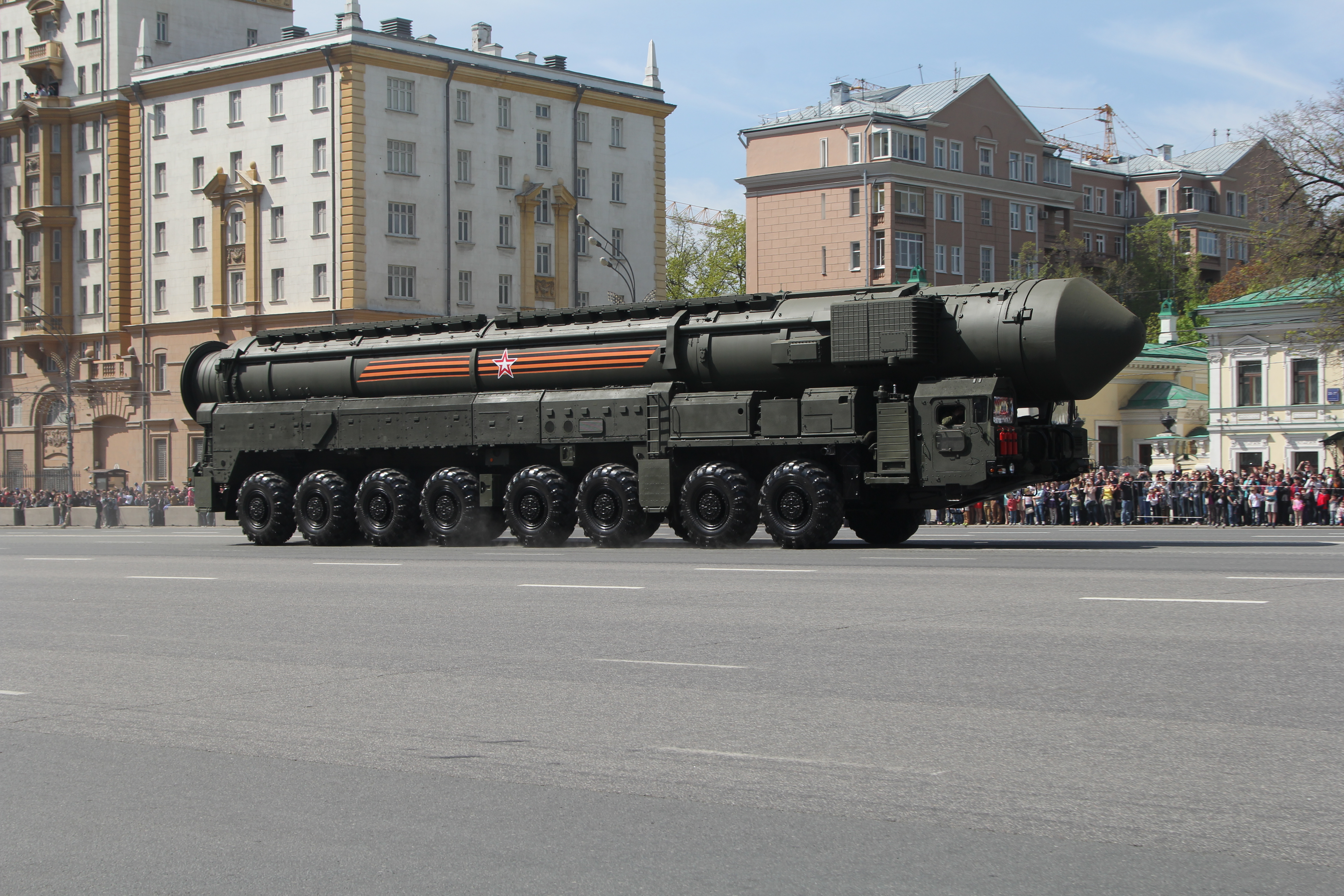
A mobile version of the RS-24 Yars

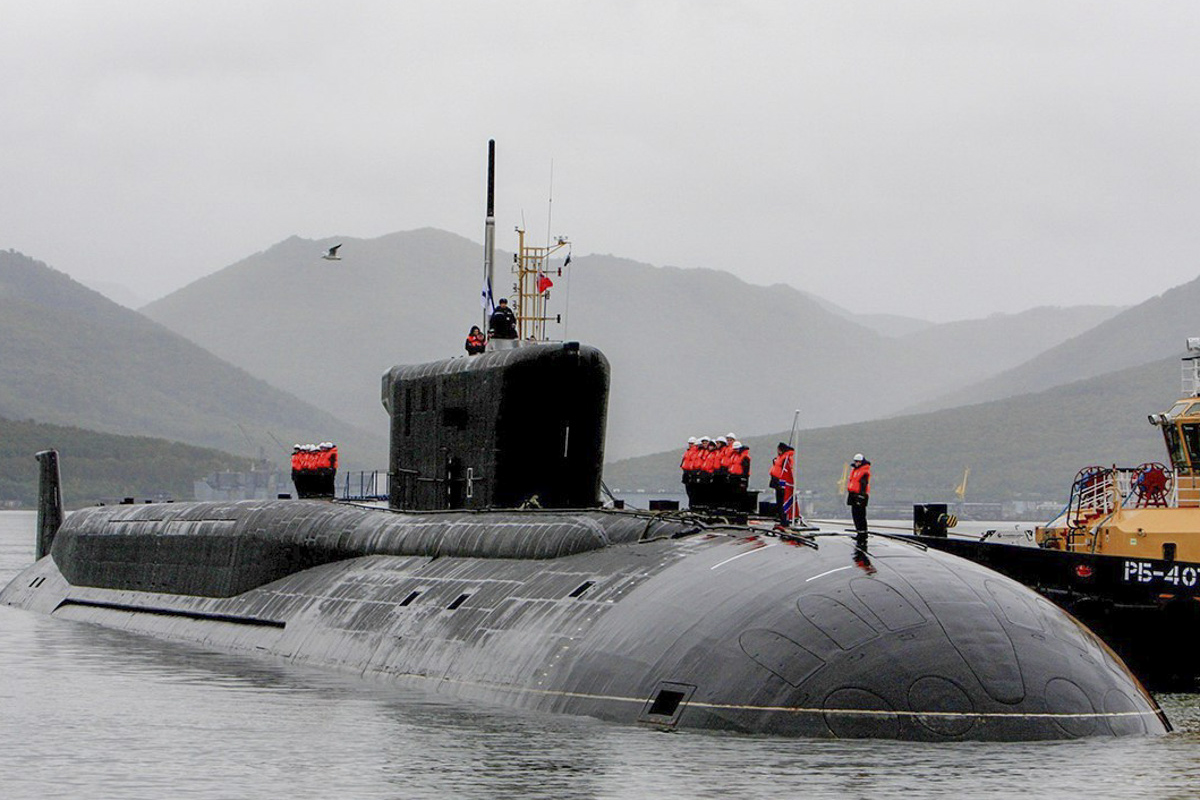
The Borei-class submarine Alexander Nevsky

As of January 2017, the Federation of American Scientists estimated that Russia has approximately 1,765 deployed strategic warheads, and another 2,700 non-deployed strategic and deployed and non-deployed tactical warheads, plus an additional 2,510 warheads awaiting dismantlement. Russia's Strategic Rocket Forces controls its land-based nuclear warheads, while the Navy controls the submarine based missiles and the Aerospace Forces the air-launched warheads. Russia's nuclear warheads are deployed in four areas:

1. Land-based immobile (silos), like R-36 and its replacement RS-28 Sarmat.
2. Land-based mobile, like RT-2PM2 Topol-M and new RS-24 Yars.
3. Submarine based, like R-29RMU2 Layner and RSM-56 Bulava.
4. Air-launched warheads of the Russian Aerospace Forces' Long Range Aviation Command

The military doctrine of Russia sees NATO expansion as one of the threats for the Russian Federation and reserves the right to use nuclear weapons in response to a conventional aggression that can endanger the existence of the state. In keeping with this, the country's nuclear forces received adequate funding throughout the late 1990s. The number of intercontinental ballistic missiles and warheads on active duty has declined over the years, in part in keeping with arms limitation agreements with the U.S. and in part due to insufficient spending on maintenance, but this is balanced by the deployment of new missiles as proof against missile defences.

Russia has developed the new RT-2PM2 Topol-M (SS-27) missiles that a Russian general claimed to be able to penetrate any missile defence, including the planned U.S. National Missile Defence. The missile can change course in both air and space to avoid countermeasures. It is designed to be launched from land-based, mobile TEL units.

Because of international awareness of the danger that Russian nuclear technology might fall into the hands of terrorists or rogue officers who it was feared might want to use nuclear weapons to threaten or attack other countries, the federal government of the United States and many other countries provided considerable financial assistance to the Russian nuclear forces in the early 1990s. This money went in part to finance decommissioning of warheads under international agreements, such the Cooperative Threat Reduction programme, but also to improve security and personnel training in Russian nuclear facilities.

In the late evening of 11 September 2007, the fuel-air explosive AVBPM or "Father of All Bombs" was successfully field-tested.

== See also ==
- Adjunctura in Russia
- Awards and emblems of the Ministry of Defence of the Russian Federation
- History of Russian military ranks
  - Army ranks and insignia of the Russian Federation
  - Naval ranks and insignia of the Russian Federation
- List of wars involving Russia#Russian Federation (1991–present)
- Main Cathedral of the Russian Armed Forces
- Military academies in Russia
- Military Band Service of the Armed Forces of Russia
- Military commissioning schools in Russia
- Reserve Officer Training in Russia
- Uniforms of the Russian Armed Forces
- Warrant officer schools of the Russian Armed Forces
