= Military training centers of civilian universities (Russia) =

Russian military educational units within civilian universities

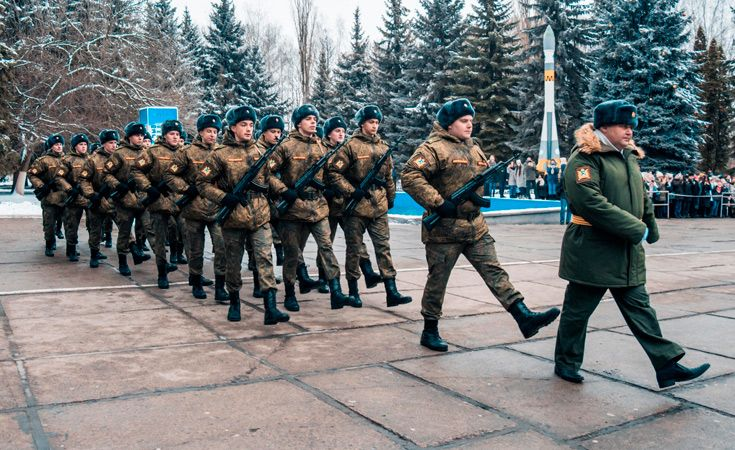
Column of students of South-West State University marching on the parade ground during military training center's exercises

The military training center (Russian: военный учебный центр) is a division within a civilian university or other higher education institution, intended for training commissioned officers from among students in the Russian Federation. The abbreviation of military training center is MTC (Russian: ВУЦ).

== History ==
Military training centers appeared with enactment of the Federal Law of 3 August 2018 No.309-FZ which entered into force on 1 January 2019. Previously existing organizational structures which conducted military training of students of civilian universities were abolished. On 13 March 2019, the list of 93 civilian institutions of higher education with military training centers was approved by Government of Russia. The Regulations on the military training centers was approved on 3 July 2019.

== Mission ==
Military training centers have 2 main functions:

- Training commissioned officers for active duty

Graduates are commissioned as a lieutenant (after graduation from their civilian university), are exempted from military draft, but under the conditions of the signed contracts, they are obliged to serve in Russian Armed Forces with a mininum service time of three years.

- Training reserve commissioned officers

Graduates are commissioned as a lieutenant (after graduation from their civilian university), are exempted from military draft, are not to obliged to serve, and are enrolled in the mobilization human resource immediately after a graduation. They can join active duty military service or mobilization human reserve (part-time military service) on a voluntary basis.

Furthermore, some military training centers pursue programmes of training reserve non-commissioned officers and reserve enlisted personnel, which are reduced curriculums compared to officer's programme. These programmes' alumni enter service as a sergeant/1st class petty officer (non-commissioned officer programme) or private/seaman (enlisted personnel programme), are exempted from the military draft, are not to obliged to serve, and are enrolled in the mobilization human resource pool.

== Organizational structure ==
Typical military training center has the following structure:

- Head of military training center
- Deputy head of military training center
  - Head of department (each military training center has several departments)
    - Chief of educational unit – deputy head of department
      - Chief of training cycle – principal teacher (educational unit has 2 cycles minimum)
        - leading teachers
        - senior teachers
        - teachers
        - junior teachers
  - Head of educational-methodical division
    - personnel of educational-methodical division
  - Head of logistic and engineering division
    - personnel of logistic and engineering division
  - Head of transport and production division
    - personnel of transport and production division
- secretary-clerk

== List of Russian civilian institutions of higher education having military training centers ==
There are the following civilian institutions of higher education having military training centers in Russia:

=== Central Military District ===
==== Barnaul ====
- Altai State Technical University

==== Chelyabinsk ====
- South Ural State University

==== Irkutsk ====
- Irkutsk National Research Technical University
- Irkutsk State University

==== Kazan ====
- Kazan National Research Technical University named after A.N. Tupolev
- Kazan National Research Technological University

==== Krasnoyarsk ====
- Siberian Federal University
- Siberian State Aerospace University

==== Kyzyl ====
- Tuvan State University

==== Novosibirsk ====
- Siberian State University of Telecommunications and Informatics

==== Omsk ====
- Omsk State Technical University
- Siberian State Automobile and Highway University

==== Penza ====
- Penza State University

==== Samara Oblast ====
===== Samara =====
- Samara National Research University
- Samara State Technical University

===== Tolyatti =====
- Togliatti State University

==== Saratov ====
- Yuri Gagarin State Technical University of Saratov

==== Tomsk ====
- Tomsk Polytechnic University
- Tomsk State University

==== Ufa ====
- Ufa State Aviation Technical University

==== Ulyanovsk ====
- Ulyanovsk Institute of Civil Aviation

==== Yekaterinburg ====
- Ural Federal University

=== Eastern Military District ===
==== Chita ====
- Transbaikal State University

==== Khabarovsk Krai ====
===== Khabarovsk =====
- Far Eastern State Transport University

===== Komsomolsk-on-Amur =====
- Komsomolsk-on-Amur State University

==== Petropavlovsk-Kamchatsky ====
- Kamchatka State Technical University

==== Ulan-Ude ====
- East Siberia State University of Technology and Management

==== Vladivostok ====
- Far Eastern Federal University
- Maritime State University
- Vladivostok State Medical University

=== Leningrad Military District ===
==== Murmansk ====
- Murmansk State Technical University

=== Southern Military District ===
==== Krasnodar Krai ====
===== Krasnodar =====
- Kuban State Agrarian University

===== Novorossiysk =====
- State Maritime University

==== Rostov Oblast ====
===== Novocherkassk =====
- South Russian State Polytechnic University

===== Rostov-on-Don =====
- Don State Technical University
- Rostov State Medical University
- Rostov State Transport University
- Southern Federal University

==== Stavropol ====
- North-Caucasus Federal University

==== Vladikavkaz ====
- North Ossetian State University

==== Volgograd ====
- Volgograd State Agrarian University

==== Territory of Crimea peninsula ====
===== Sevastopol =====
- Sevastopol National Technical University

===== Simferopol =====
- Crimean Federal University

=== Western Military District ===
==== Belgorod ====
- Belgorod Technological University

==== Ivanovo ====
- Ivanovo State Power Engineering University

==== Kostroma ====
- Kostroma State University

==== Kursk ====
- South-West State University

==== Moscow and Moscow Oblast ====
===== Lyubertsy =====
- Russian Customs Academy

===== Moscow =====
- All-Russian State University of Justitia
- Bauman Moscow State Technical University
- Financial University under the Government of the Russian Federation
- First Moscow State Medical University
- Gubkin Russian State University of Oil and Gas
- Higher School of Economics
- Kutafin Moscow State Law University
- Moscow Academy of the Investigative Committee of Russia
- Moscow Automobile and Road Construction State Technical University
- Moscow Aviation Institute
- Moscow Institute of Physics and Technology
- Moscow Power Engineering Institute
- Moscow State Institute of International Relations
- Moscow State Linguistic University
- Moscow State University
- Moscow State University of Civil Engineering
- Moscow State University of Geodesy and Cartography
- Moscow State University of Medicine and Dentistry
- Moscow Technological University (MIREA)
- National Research Nuclear University MEPhI (Moscow Engineering Physics Institute)
- National Research University of Electronic Technology
- Russian State Agrarian University - Moscow Timiryazev Agricultural Academy
- Russian State University of Justice
- Russian University of Transport
- State University of Land Use Planning

==== Nizhny Novgorod ====
- N. I. Lobachevsky State University of Nizhny Novgorod

==== Petrozavodsk ====
- Petrozavodsk State University

==== Ryazan ====
- Ryazan State Radio Engineering University

==== Saint Petersburg ====
- Baltic State Technical University
- ITMO University
- Peter the Great St. Petersburg Polytechnic University
- Russian State Hydrometeorological University
- Saint Petersburg Academy of the Investigative Committee of Russia
- Saint Petersburg Electrotechnical University
- Saint Petersburg State Marine Technical University
- Saint Petersburg Mining University
- Saint Petersburg State University
- Saint Petersburg State University of Aerospace Instrumentation
- St. Petersburg State University of Telecommunications
- State University of Maritime and Inland Shipping

==== Tambov ====
- Tambov State University

==== Tula ====
- Tula State University

==== Vladimir Oblast ====
===== Kovrov =====
- Kovrov State Technological Academy

==== Voronezh ====
- Voronezh State Technical University
- Voronezh State University
