= Reserve Officer Training in Russia =

Russian military training program

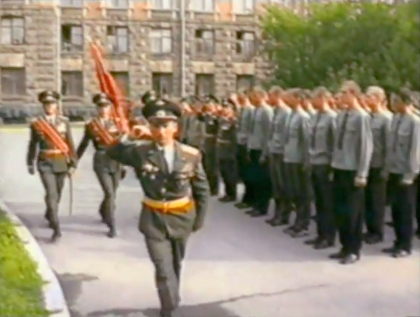
Colonel Leonid Khabarov leads the march of a Russian reserve officer training unit honor guard.

The Reserve Officer Training system is intended for training commissioned officers from among students of Russian civilian institutions of higher education.

== History ==
=== In the Soviet era ===
The Reserve Officer Training in the Soviet Union was established in 1927. According to the Soviet Union Law about compulsory military service of 13 August 1930 No.42/253б, this training was known as higher non-inside-military-unit training, and a list of civilian universities conducting this training was approved by People's Commissariat for Military and Naval Affairs. The first list existed in 1927.

Initially, the officer, responsible for conducting the higher non-inside-military-unit training in civilian university, was named "military head" (Russian: военный руководитель). The first congress of these military heads was held in 1927. The term "military department" (Russian: военная кафедра) appeared later, when Council of People's Commissars of the Soviet Union Decree of 13 April 1944 No.413 was promulgated.

With the enactment of the Soviet Union Law about universal military duty of 12 October 1967 No.1950-VII, reserve officer training conducting by military departments of civilian higher education institutions became mandatory for all able-bodied male students (and all able-bodied female medical students) of institutions that had such departments.

With the enactment of the Soviet Union Law about universal military duty of 12 October 1967 No.1950-VII, all able-bodied male students and all-able bodied female medical students attending schools that had military departments were to be enrolled in reserve officer training.

According to Lt. Col. F. Edward Jones, an American military analyst with the U.S. Army War College who studied Soviet reserve military forces, not all men served on active duty with the Soviet Armed Forces. All students who were enrolled in a reserve officer training program while in university were exempt from conscript service. Some of them, particularly those in engineering fields, were later called to active duty as reserve officers for periods ranging from two to three years.

Thus, there was a system of selective conscription of graduates of military departments within civilian institutions of higher education in the USSR. Such people could be conscripted to active duty, but until the certain age. At the end of the period of active duty, the conscripts were reenlisted in the armed forced reserve. Such officers were called "blazers" in army slang (for example, Anatoly Kvashnin was a "blazer").

There was a particular goal in cross-training civil specialists. In the classless society of the Soviet Union, every individual was guaranteed a job, so it was beneficial to train civilians to perform similar jobs in the military as they do in their professional careers. Truck drivers for example, worked for whatever organization their job is associated with; they could be drivers who shuttle machine parts from their factory in Kiev to outlying areas, but they were also registered with the local civilian transport enterprise (Avtokolonna) who receive requirements from the local military commissariat (Voenkomat) for a designated number of trucks for mobilization or a particular military exercise. As these drivers are well trained and are driving a truck that they have driven many times before (civilian trucks are identical to the military version – one could do a one-for-one exchange and not suffer any decrement of the mission), the system works out very well. The commanders who are receiving these drivers with their trucks know exactly how many vehicles they will receive, where they are coming from, their license numbers, and the driver's name. The same is applicable for the rest of the civil specialties, such as medics, mechanics, radio operators, telegraph operators or even jewelers, as well as many others.

In the 1960s–1970s, the number of universities with military departments was increased to 497 and the annual number of graduates was about 170,000, approximately 30% of which were drafted into active duty. The number of civilian institutions of higher education which had military departments was decreased to 397 by 1990.

Soviet military education was aimed at training of officer-specialists in narrowly defined military occupational specialties, and it differed greatly from American military education system in which newly qualified second lieutenants receive particular specialties in the framework of their "career branch" only after graduation from military academy or ROTC. Students of Soviet civilian universities having military departments could not choose a military occupational specialty because each civilian specialty taught by the university was attached to particular military occupational specialty taught by a military department of the same university by the rector's order.

It differed from American military education system, in which student can choose between available types of ROTC. Soviet military doctrine provided for mass mobilization and required a significant number of reserve officers for combat operations and maintenance of military equipment in wartime. That is why military departments conducted training mostly at command, engineering, and to a lesser extent at administrative and humanities military occupational specialties.

Military education became voluntary for all students in 1990. Students still could not choose a military occupational specialty.

=== In post-Soviet era ===
Russia inherited the Soviet reserve officer training system. 241 Russian civilian institutions of higher education retained military departments after the Dissolution of the Soviet Union. Some institutions had several military departments, which were subsequently merged into a few military faculties and 1 separate military institute. Initially, more substantial reduction in the number of military departments was planned, but that had to be abandoned due to dearth of lieutenants associated with regular officers voluntary discharge owing to financial problems of Armed Forces in 1990s. This had to be compensated through reserve officers conscription, which had acquired a particular importance on the background of First Chechen War.

Federal Law of 28 March 1998, No.53-FZ «On military duty and military service» (in version which was valid as 31 December 2007) provided that only full-time face-to-face learning students of civilian institution of higher education could be accepted to the military department of this civilian institution of higher education (hereinafter in the text also - university). Enrolling in the military department was voluntary for all students. Students could not choose military occupational specialty, because military occupational specialty was entirely dependent on main civilian specialty – each civilian specialty taught by university was attached to particular military occupational specialty taught by military department of the same university by the rector's order (a situation that continues today).

After finishing military department’s course, including military training camps or traineeship in military units of regular armed forces, and passing the state final exam, the student would be promoted to the rank of lieutenant in the Russian military. Graduates of military departments were supposed to be promoted to officer at the same time as their enlistment in the armed forces reserve, but the Ministry of Defence issued an order to make the delay the promotion until the enlistee graduates from their civilian university. Afterwards, such officers could be conscripted from the reserve of armed forces to active duty, but only until the age of 27. The period of active duty of such officer was 2 years, and at the end of that period he was due to be enlisted in the reserve of armed forces again.

In the late 1990s and early 2000s, 40% of all platoon commanders were graduates of military departments of civilian universities. In 2000-2004, the annual number of graduates military departments was about 65.000, and about 15.000 graduates were conscripted to active duty annually.

The experience had shown that graduates of military departments were not so good at drilling, fire training and management of personnel as career officers. However, "blazers" were very good at maintenance of military equipment, administrative work and other work that required specific knowledge; and economic cost of training such officer was 4-5 lower compared to training of career officer. Subsequent reforms were aimed to reduction of the number of civilian students training as reserve officers and, at the same time, to maximum possible harmonization of military occupational specialty and main civilian specialty of a student.

==== 2005–2008 reform ====
In 2005, the Minister of Defence, Sergei Ivanov, announced the forthcoming significant reduction in the number of military departments carrying out the training commissioned officers from among students of civilian institutions of higher education. Until 2008, there were 235 civilian universities which had military departments, in Russia. By March 2008, 168 of 235 civilian universities which previously had military departments had lost these units. In addition, 37 of 67 civilian universities which retained military departments became the basis for establishment of new training military centers.

On 1 January 2008 the amendments entered into force. Conscription of reserve officers was abolished (with exception of short-dated military camps in peaceful time and wartime mobilization). Thus, university graduates, who have graduated the military departments of their almae matres, were not subject to conscription to active duty no more (previously the state has conscripted them selectively). The amendments provided a new type of military training unit in universities – the Training Military Center. The difference between the training military centers and the military departments was that absolutely all of graduates of training military centers were due to be enrolled for active duty immediately upon the university graduation. The period of active duty of such officers was 3 years. Enrolling in the training military center was voluntary.

Overall, the training military centers focused on training officers for active duty, whilst the military departments focused on training officers for reserve. Most of officers, trained at training military centers, had military occupational specialties related to the activity of operational support military units (military engineer, military programmer, military doctor, military police officer, etc.).

Starting on 6 March 2008, there were 37 training military centers and 67 military departments or military faculties (military faculty consists some various fields military departments) in civilian universities in Russia. Wherein, the military departments or the military faculties continued to operate in all of 37 civilian universities where training military centers were established (i.e. 37 universities had training military centers and military departments or faculties at the same time but 30 universities had military departments or faculties only).

==== 2019 reform ====
On 1 January 2019 new amendments entered into force. The military departments, the military faculties, the training military centers were abolished. From now on, students are trained under both officers training programmes (for reserve and for active duty) in the Military Training Centers.

Starting on 13 March 2019, there are military training centers in 93 civilian universities in Russia.

== Joining the program ==
The procedure of military training centers enrollment is regulated by the Order of the Minister of Defence of the Russian Federation of 26 August 2020 No.400.

Student wishing to join the program should submit an application. Then he should pass a medical examination, a psychological test, and a physical fitness test. Admission is conducted on a competitive basis, because the number of admission slots is limited. This number is annually determined by Main Directorate of personnel of the Ministry of Defence of Russian Federation separately for each military training center, each military occupational specialty, each program (for active duty or for reserve), each gender (male or female), as illustrated below.

Military occuparional specialty code	Officers for active duty training program		Reserve officers training program	
Military occuparional specialty code	Male	Female	Male	Female
Military training center within XXXXXX State University
ВУС-XXX001	100	10	150	30
ВУС-XXX002	30	3	65	4
Military training center within XXXXXXXXXXXXXXX State University
ВУС-XXX001	75	5	90	15
ВУС-XXX003	10	0	15	0

Student wishing to join the program can't choose a military occupational specialty, because each civilian specialty taught by university is attached to particular military occupational specialty taught by military training center of the same university by the rector's order, as illustrated below.

Civilian specialty code	Military occuparional specialty code
XX.XX.01	ВУС-XXX001
XX.XX.07	ВУС-XXX003
XX.XX.09	ВУС-XXX005

The current academic performance of applicants is taken into consideration in the competitive process. Some categories of applicants have admission preferences: orphans, children of the military personnel of Russian Armed Forces, persons demobbed from Russian Armed Forces after the end of the conscript service period.

Students, passed the competitive selection, sign the contracts and are enrolled in military training center by the rector's order. Students, enrolled in officers for active duty training program, get special scholarships.

== Training process ==
In accordance with the Order of the Minister of Defence of the Russian Federation of 26 August 2020 No.400, each military occupational specialty taught by the military training center should have its own training program that includes:

- classroom study on disciplines (lectures, seminars, practical classes, laboratory work, special war games)
- homework
- physical training
- group field training exercises (tactical exercises, special war games)
- midterm assessments (tests and examinations)
- military training camp
- final assessment (interdisciplinary exam)

As a rule, classroom study, physical training and group field training exercises are conducted one day a week (so-called military day). Military day is determined by the rector in consultation with the head of military training center. There are no university classes on civilian subjects that day including for students who are not training at military training center.

Midterm assessments are held at the end of each semester. Students are sent to 30-days military training camp in summer after the completion of the training course. Students get access to final exam after the end of military training camp. Those who successfully pass final exams are promoted to lieutenant rank, with the order entered into force only after graduation from university (main civilian specialty).

== After graduation ==
All graduates of military training centers are exempted from the military draft.

Those who studied at officers for active duty program are obliged to serve in Russian Armed Forces for at least 3 years under the conditions of the signed contracts.

Those who studied at reserve officers program are not to obliged to serve and are enrolled in mobilization human resource immediately after a graduation. They can join active duty military service or mobilization human reserve (part-time military service) on voluntary basis. However, they are subject to mobilization in wartime and short-term military training in peacetime on involuntary basis as regulated by law.

== See also ==
- Military education in the Soviet Union
- Reserve Officers' Training Corps
