= Emblem of the Russian Armed Forces =

- Armiger: Russian Armed Forces
- Adopted: 27 January 1997

The Emblem of the Armed Forces of the Russian Federation (Russian: Эмблема Вооружённых сил Российской Федерации) is a golden double-headed eagle with outstretched wings, holding a sword in its right claw and an oak wreath in its left. A crowned shield rests on the eagle's chest. On the shield, against a red background, is a horseman slaying a dragon with a spear.

== History ==
The emblem's prototype was a symbol used by the Imperial Russian Army in the early 19th century. The new emblem is intended to replace the Soviet Army's insignia—a red star with a hammer and sickle that remained after the collapse of the Soviet Union. The emblem was developed around August 1993 by a team of authors: Yu. V. Abaturov, I. S. Smetannikov, and R. I. Malanichev, long before its official approval in 1997. It was formally adopted in accordance with a presidential decree issued by president Boris Yeltsin on January 27, 1997.

The only difference in the current emblem is that the flaming torch with arrows in the right claw has been replaced by a sword, which symbolizes strength and military might. In its left claw, the eagle holds a laurel wreath, symbolizing Russia's victories. The red shield with St. George the Victorious is topped with the imperial crown: This saint is the patron of our troops.

== Overview ==
The military heraldic symbol—the emblem of the Russian Armed Forces is a symbol that establishes the affiliation of military personnel, as well as weapons, military equipment, and other property of the Russian Armed Forces.

The emblem may serve as the basis for the creation of emblems for branches of the Russian Armed Forces, territorial commands of the Russian Armed Forces, functional commands of the Russian Armed Forces, and branches of the armed forces (services).

The emblem is placed on forms of orders and directives of the Minister of Defense of the Russian Federation and his deputies, corner stamps, or forms with corner stamps of military command bodies, associations, formations, military units, enterprises, institutions, organizations, military academies, universities, institutes, and schools of the Ministry of Defense of the Russian Federation.

The emblem is depicted on weapons and military equipment as an identification mark of national affiliation.

The emblem is displayed in the office of the Minister of Defense of the Russian Federation, in the hall of the Collegium of the Ministry of Defense of the Russian Federation, and is also depicted on the standard (flag) of the Minister of Defense of the Russian Federation in the manner determined by the Minister of Defense of the Russian Federation.

The image of the emblem is placed in the manner determined by the Minister of Defense of the Russian Federation on:

- Battle flags (standards) of military units;
- Flags (banner flags) and pennants of ships and vessels of the Navy;
- Flags of the branches of the Russian Armed Forces;
- Flags (standards) of officials of the Ministry of Defense of the Russian Federation;
- Insignia and rank badges of military personnel of the Russian Armed Forces;
- Honorary weapons.

The emblem may be displayed on:

- Printed materials published by the Ministry of Defense of the Russian Federation, as well as film, video, and photographic materials produced by the Ministry of Defense of the Russian Federation;
- Advertising, informational, and souvenir products (brochures, booklets, calendars, badges, pennants, flags, watches, appliqués, tableware, tie clips, medallions, stationery, and other items) manufactured to order for the Ministry of Defense of the Russian Federation.
