= Military departments of civilian universities (Soviet Union and post-Soviet area) =

Soviet military educational units within civilian universities

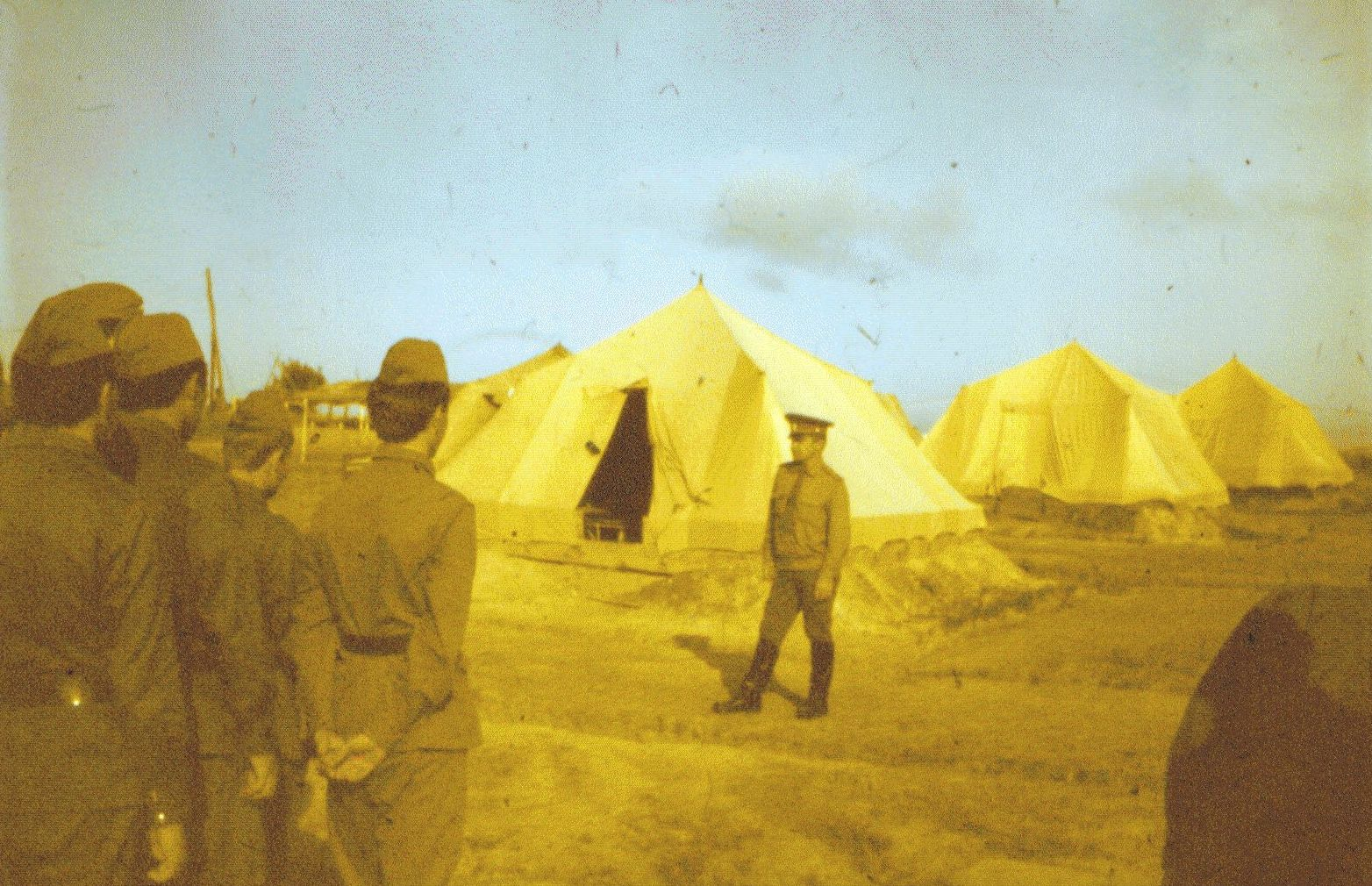
Soviet students of civilian institution of higher education with military department in military field camp in 1986

The military department (Russian: военная кафедра) is a division within civilian university or other higher education institution, intended for training commissioned officers from among students, widespread in Soviet Union and Post-Soviet states.

The similar phenomenon known as military faculty (Russian: военный факультет) or faculty of military training (Russian: факультет военного обучения) exists in some post-Soviet states. A faculty of military training is a division within civilian university composed of two or more military departments conducting training in different fields of military science.

== History ==
Reserve Officer Training in Soviet Union was officially established in 1927. According to the Soviet Union Law about compulsory military service of 13 August 1930 No.42/253б, this training was known as higher non-inside-military-unit training, and a list of civilian universities conducting this training was approved by People's Commissariat for Military and Naval Affairs. The first list existed in 1927.

Initially, the officer, responsible for conducting the higher non-inside-military-unit training in civilian university, was named "military head" (Russian: военный руководитель). The first congress of these military heads was held in 1927. The term "military department" appeared later, when Council of People's Commissars of the Soviet Union Decree of 13 April 1944 No.413 was promulgated.

With the enactment of the Soviet Union Law about universal military duty of 12 October 1967 No.1950-VII, reserve officer training conducting by military departments of civilian higher education institutions became mandatory for all students of institutions that had such departments. In 1960-70's, the numbers of universities with military departments were increased to 497, the annual number of graduates was about 170.000, approximately 30% of which drafted into active duty. The number of civilian institutions of higher education which had military departments were decreased to 397 by 1990.

== Organizational structure ==
Typical Soviet military department had following structure:

- Head of military department (usually with the rank of colonel)
- Deputy head of military department (usually with the rank of lieutenant colonel or colonel)
  - Chief of educational unit (usually with the rank of major or lieutenant colonel)
    - Chief of training cycle (usually with the rank of major)
      - two or more teachers in each cycle (usually with the rank of captain or major)
  - Chief of logistic and educational process supporting unit (usually with the rank of major or lieutenant colonel)
    - personnel of logistic and educational process supporting unit (military and civilian)
- secretary-clerk (civilian)

== In post-Soviet area ==
=== Belarus ===
The Government of Belarus Decree of 18 March 1993 No.152 approved the list of 10 Belarusian civilian institutions of higher education that had military departments. Subsequently, some military departments were reorganized into military faculties. This Decree was replaced by the Decree of 5 November 2003 No.1469. The Decree of 5 November 2003 No.1469 has been amended on several occasions, and it is currently providing for 7 universities with military faculties and 7 universities with military departments.

=== Kyrgyzstan ===
The Cabinet of Ministers of the Kyrgyz Republic Decree of 8 July 2004 No.519 approved the list of 45 Kyrgyz civilian institutions of higher education that had military departments. The Decree of 8 July 2004 No.519 had been amended on several occasions. All military departments were abolished by the Decree of 15 January 2010 No.14, but this Decree had been revised by the Decree of 6 September 2010 No.190. Prior to 2017, there were 18 civilian institutions of higher education that had military departments. The Decree of 8 July 2004 No.519 was finally repealed with enactment of the Cabinet of Ministers of the Kyrgyz Republic Decree of 13 December 2017 No.805. Since that moment, the Kyrgyz State Medical Academy is the only civilian institution of higher education with a military department.

=== Moldova ===
The law No. 1245 of 18 July 2002 adopted by the Moldovan Parliament allows the creation of military departments in institutions of higher education. Upon the completion of a military course of a military department, the citizen is exempt from Moldova's 12-month conscription, which applies to all males aged 18 to 27.

=== Russia ===
In 1993, 241 Russian civilian higher education institutions had military departments. Some institutions had several military departments, which subsequently were merged into few faculties of military training.

In 2005, minister of defence Sergei Ivanov announced the forthcoming significant reduction in the number of military departments carrying out the training commissioned officers from among students of civilian institutions of higher education. Until 2008, there were 235 civilian universities which had military departments, in Russia. By March 2008, 168 of 235 civilian universities which previously had military departments had lost these units. Starting on 6 March 2008, there were 67 military departments or faculties of military training in civilian universities in Russia.

On 1 January 2019, the amendments, contained in Federal Law of 3 August 2018, No.309-FZ, entered into force. According to these amendments, the military departments, the faculties of military training were abolished. From now on, students are trained under both officers training programmes (for reserve and for active duty) in new military training centers.

=== Ukraine ===
The Government of Ukraine Decree of 26 July 2001 No.866 approved the list of Ukrainian civilian institutions of higher education that had military departments. This Decree was replaced by the Decree of 1 February 2012 No.48. The Decree of 1 February 2012 No.48 has been amended on several occasions, and it is currently providing for 56 universities with military departments or faculties of military training.

== Notable graduates ==
- Anatoly Kvashnin (1946–2022) graduated from the Kurgan Machine Building Institute with specialist degree in engineering and the military department of this institute in 1969, received his officer commission as a lieutenant. He drafted into active duty in July of the same year. Subsequently, after the ending of his conscript military service, he decided to stay in armed forces as volunteer and rose to the position of Chief of the General Staff of Russian Armed Forces and the military rank of Army General.
