= Comparative navy enlisted ranks of Post-Soviet states =

Rank comparison chart of enlisted for all navies of Post-Soviet states.

== Enlisted (OR 1–9) ==
Rank group	Senior NCOs										Junior NCOs			Enlisted
Armenia	No navy
Azerbaijani Navy														No insigna
Azerbaijani Navy	Baş miçman	Miçman	Kiçik miçman		Baş çavuş		Çavuş		Kiçik çavuş		Baş matros			Matros
Belarus	No navy
Estonian Navy
Estonian Navy	Ülemveebel	Staabiveebel	Vanemveebel		Veebel		Nooremveebel		Vanemmaat		Maat	Nooremmaat		Vanemmadrus	Madrus
(Georgia (country)) Georgia	No navy
Rank group	Senior NCOs										Junior NCOs			Enlisted
Kazakh Naval Forces
Kazakh Naval Forces	Шебер-старшина; Şeber-starşïna	Штаб-старшина; Ştab-starşïna	Бірінші сыныпты старшина Birinşi sınıptı starşïna	Eкінші сыныпты старшина Ekinşi sınıptı starşïna	Үшінші сыныпты старшина Üşinşi sınıptı starşïna	Бас старшина Bas starshyna	Бірінші сатылы старшина Birinşi satılı starşïna		Екінші сатылы старшина Ekinşi satılı starşïna		Аға матрос Ağa matros		Матрос; Matros
Kyrgyzstan	No navy
Latvian Naval Forces
Latvian Naval Forces	Vecākais virsniekvietnieks		Virsniekvietnieks		Vecākais bocmanis		Bocmanis		Seržants		Kaprālis		Dižmatrozis	Matrozis
Lithuanian Naval Force
Lithuanian Naval Force	Vyresnysis laivūnas		Laivūnas		Štabo laivūnas		Vyresnysis seržantas		Seržantas		Grandinis		Vyresnysis jūreivis	Jūreivis	Jaunesnysis jūreivis
Moldova	No navy
Rank group	Senior NCOs										Junior NCOs			Enlisted
Russian Navy
Russian Navy	Старший мичман Starshy michman	Мичман; Michman	Главный корабельный старшина Glavny korabelny starshina		Главный старшина Glavny starshina		Старшина 1 статьи Starshina 1 statji		Старшина 2 статьи Starshina 2 statji		Старший матрос Starshy matros		Матрос; Matros
Tajikistan	No navy
Ukrainian Navy
Ukrainian Navy	Головний майстер-старшина Holovnyy mayster-starshyna	Старший майстер-старшина Starshyy mayster-starshyna	Майстер-старшина; Mayster-starshyna		Штаб-старшина; Shtab-starshyna		Головний корабельний старшина Holovnyy korabelʹnyy starshyna		Головний старшина Holovnyy starshyna		Старшина 1-ої статті Starshyna 1-oyi statti		Старшина 2-ої статті Starshyna 2-oyi statti	Старший матрос Starshyy matros	Матрос; Matros
Uzbek River Force
Uzbek River Force					Bosh starshina		I darajali starshina	II darajali starshina	III darajali starshina	Starshina			Matros
Rank group	Senior NCOs										Junior NCOs			Enlisted

== See also ==
- Comparative navy enlisted ranks of Asia
- Comparative navy enlisted ranks of Europe
