= Naval ranks and insignia of Russia =

The Navy of the Russian Federation inherited the ranks of the Soviet Navy, although the insignia and uniform were slightly altered. The navy predominantly uses naval-style ranks but also uses army-style ranks for some specialisations, including naval aviation, marine infantry, medical and legal.

== Ranks and insignia - naval services ==
=== Officers ===
The following table of navy ranks illustrates those of the Russian Federation. The English translation is given first, followed by the rank in Russian.

Rank group	General / flag officers				Senior officers			Junior officers
Russian Navy
Russian Navy	Адмирал флота Admiral flota	Адмирал; Admiral	Вице-адмирал; Vitse-admiral	Контр-адмирал; Contre-admiral	Капитан 1-го ранга Kapitan 1-go ranga	Капитан 2-го ранга Kapitan 2-go ranga	Капитан 3-го ранга Kapitan 3-go ranga	Капитан-лейтенант; Kapitan-leytenant	Старший лейтенант Starshiy leytenant	Лейтенант; Leytenant	Младший лейтенант Mladshiy leytenant

=== Warrant officers and ratings ===
Warrant officers (Note: Warrant officer ranks may be abolished soon but the abolition began in 2009 in accordance with defense regulations, which were reversed in 2013) and rates of the Russian Navy

Rank group	Senior NCOs						Junior NCOs	Enlisted
Russian Navy
Russian Navy	Старший мичман Starshy michman	Мичман; Michman	Главный корабельный старшина Glavny korabelny starshina	Главный старшина Glavny starshina	Старшина 1 статьи Starshina 1 statji	Старшина 2 статьи Starshina 2 statji	Старший матрос Starshy matros	Матрос; Matros

== Ranks and insignias - Ground and air services of the Navy ==
The following tables illustrate the ranks of the Russian Federation's naval infantry and shore establishment services.

=== Officers ===
Commissioned officers of the Russian Navy - naval infantry, shore services, and naval air force.

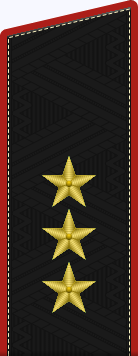
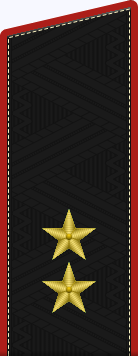
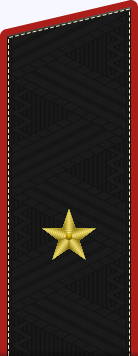
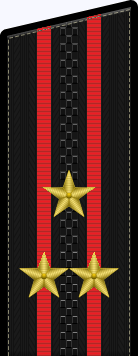
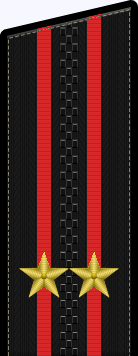
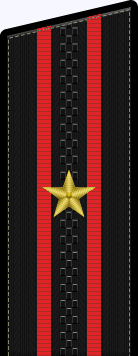
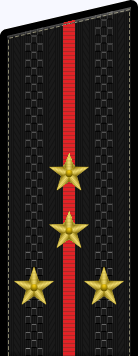
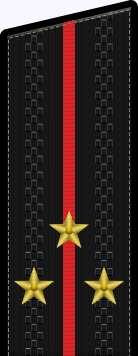
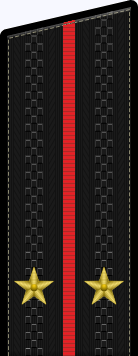
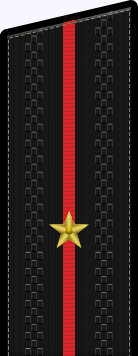
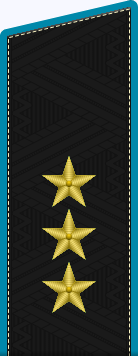
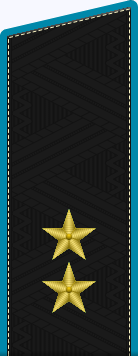
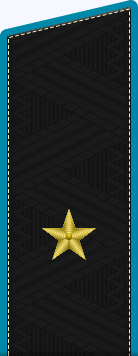
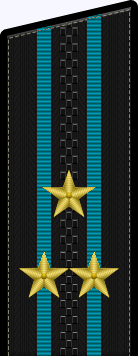
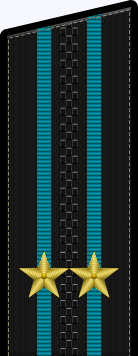
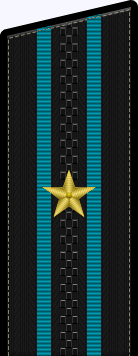
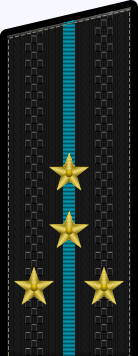
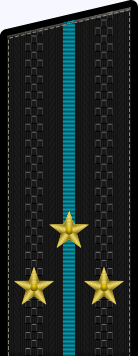
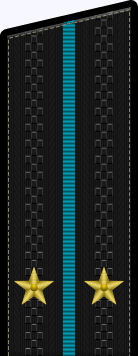
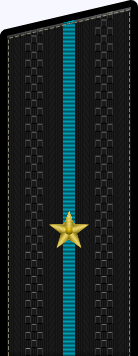
Rank group	General / flag officers			Senior officers			Junior officers
Russia (Note: Parade dress uniform colors (black on gold) are the reverse of the duty uniform.)
Russia	Генера́л-полко́вник; Generál-polkóvnik	Генера́л-лейтена́нт; Generál-leytenánt	Генера́л-майо́р; Generál-mayór	Полко́вник; Polkóvnik	Подполко́вник; Podpolkóvnik	Майо́р; Majór	Kапита́н; Kapitán	Старший лейтена́нт Stárshiy leytenánt	Лейтенант; Leytenant	Mла́дший лейтена́нт Mládshiy leytenánt	Курсант; Kursant

=== Warrant officers and other ranks ===
Warrant officers (Note: Warrant officer ranks may be abolished soon but the abolition began in 2009 by defense regulations, which were reversed in 2013) and other ranks of the Russian Navy - naval infantry, shore services, and navy air force.

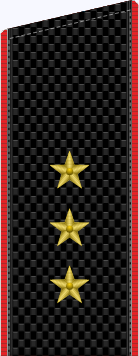
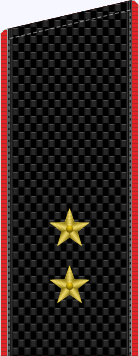
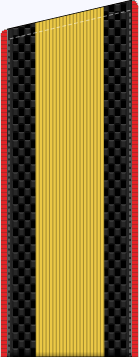
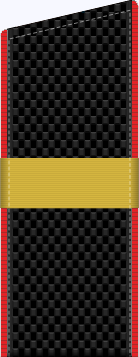
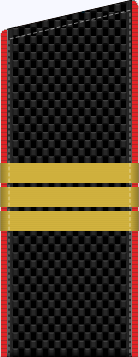
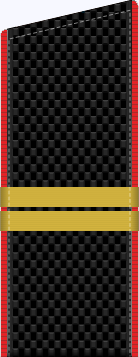
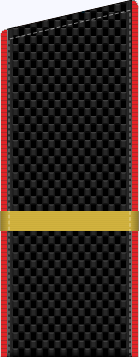
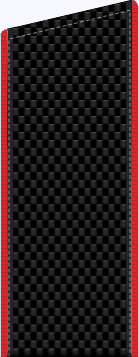
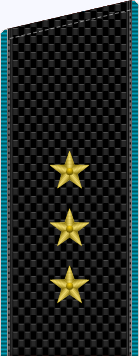
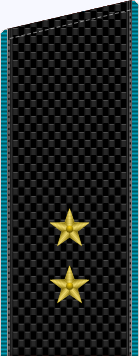
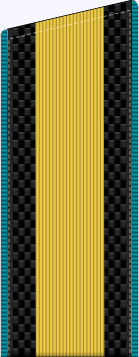
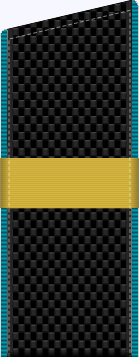
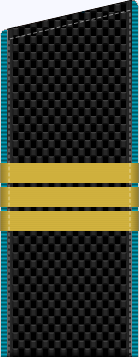
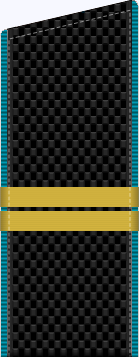
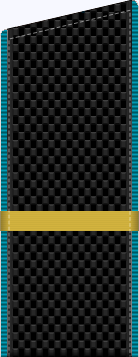
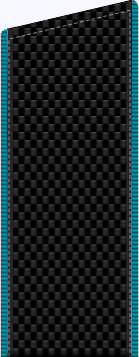
Rank group	Senior NCOs						Junior NCOs	Enlisted
Russia
Russia	Ста́рший пра́порщик Stárshiy práporshchik	Пра́порщик; Práporshchyk	Старшина́ Starshyná	Ста́рший сержа́нт Stárshiy serzhánt	Сержа́нт; Serzhánt	Мла́дший сержа́нт Mládshiy serzhánt	Старший матрос Stárshiy matros	Матрос; Matros

Rank titles are sometimes modified due to a particular assignment, branch, or status:

- The ranks of servicemen assigned to a "guards" unit, formation, or ship are preceded by the word "guards";
- The ranks of servicemen in the legal, medical, and veterinary branches are followed by "of justice", "of the medical service", and "of the veterinary service", respectively;
- The ranks of servicemen in reserve or retirement are followed by "of the reserve" or "in retirement", respectively;
- The rank descriptor "of aviation" was officially abolished but is still commonly used, common use of it, however, is being phrased out.

== Rank insignia of civilian personnel ==
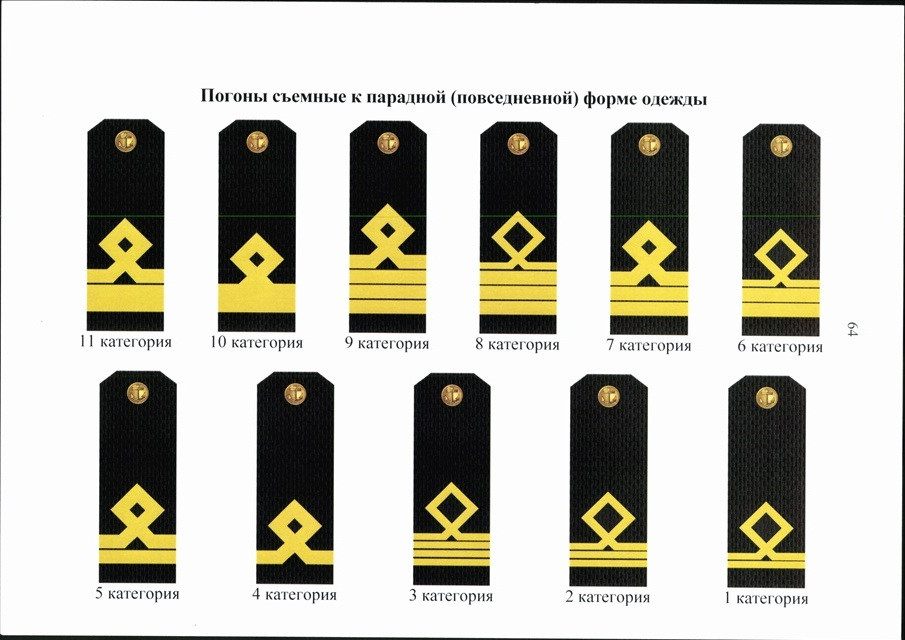
Rank insignia of civilian sea-going personnel of the Russian Navy.

== See also ==
- Russian military ranks
- Army ranks and insignia of the Russian Federation
- Russian military
- Ranks and insignia of the Soviet military
