= Ranks and insignia of the Russian Armed Forces (1994–2010) =

Ranks and insignia of the Russian Federation's armed forces from 1994 to 2010 were affected by the disintegration of the former Soviet armed forces, and there were other changes in insignia design when the newly established Russian Federation came into existence. The ranks depicted below were replaced with those adopted by decree № 293 of the President of the Russian Federation on 11 March 2010. The transition began with the issue of new military uniforms to the armed services in 2008 in the Moscow area and in 2010 nationwide. The ranks of marshal of the branch and chief marshal were officially abolished as a result of the 1994 regulations.

Colonel
(army / ground forces)

Parade uniform

Service uniform

Field uniform

Shoulder boards
Captain 1st rank (navy)

Parade uniform

Service uniform

Shoulder boards

== Shoulder boards ==
=== Enlisted men ===
Enlisted men wear no rank on their working uniform shoulder boards. On parade uniforms, the shoulder board shows a Cyrillic letter symbol.

- ВС — armed forces personnel (Russian: Bооружённые силы; vo'oruzhonnye sily)
- Ф — fleet personnel (Russian: Флот; flot)
- К — army and air force military student (Russian: Курсант; kursant)
- Anchor — naval military student
- Н — students of the Nakhimov Naval School (Russian: Нахимовское военно-морское училище; Nakhimovskoye voyenno-morskoye uchilishche)
- СВУ — students of the Suvorov Military School (Russian: Суворовское военное училище; Suvorovskoye voyennoye uchilishche)
- ВМУ — students of the school of military music (Russian: Военно-музыкальное училище; voyenno-muzykalnoye uchilishche)
- КК — cadets of the cadet corps (Russian: Кадетский корпус; kadetsky korpus)
- МКК — Kronstadt Sea Cadet Corps (Russian: Кронштадтский морской кадетский корпус; Kronshtadtsky morskoy kadetsky korpus)
- ВВ — internal troops (Russian: Внутренние войска; vnutrenniye voyska)

=== Non-commissioned officers ===
Non-commissioned officers up to staff sergeant (Russian: cтаршина; starshina) wear shoulder boards with the Cyrillic letter symbol for their branch and their rank stripes.

- Field uniform — camouflage colour
- Service uniform — yellow coloured
- Parade uniform — gold coloured

=== Warrant officers and michman ===
Warrant officers and michman wore shoulder boards similar to enlisted personnel and non-commissioned officers, but their ranks were shown by small stars arranged in vertical order.

== Distinction insignia ==
=== Enlisted personnel, NCOs and warrant officers ===
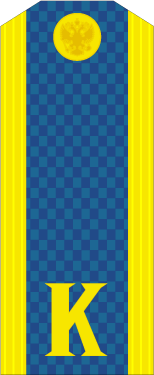
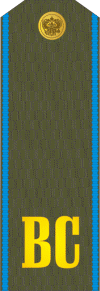
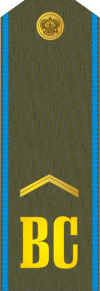
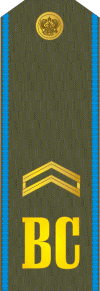
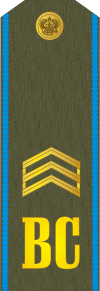
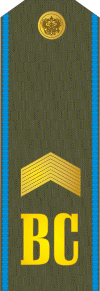
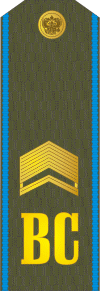
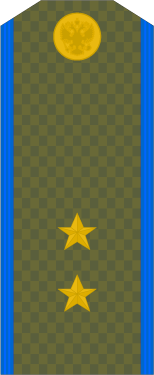
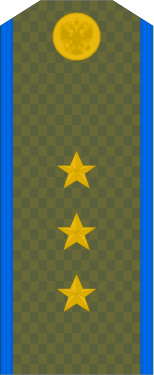
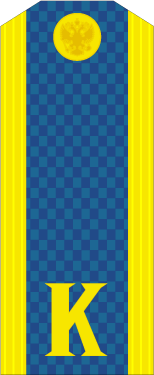
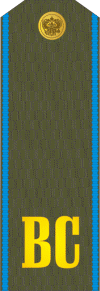
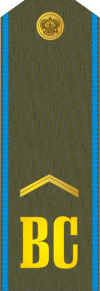
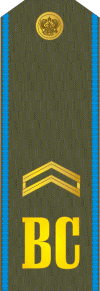
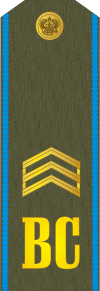
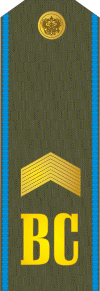
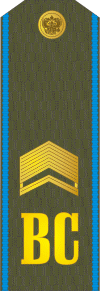
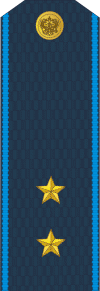
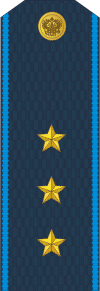
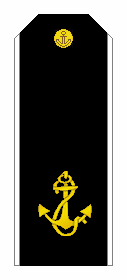
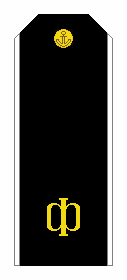
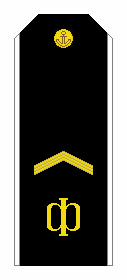
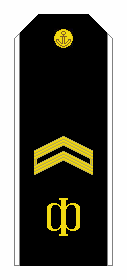
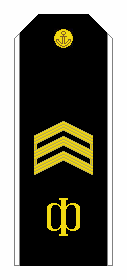
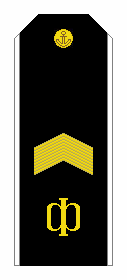
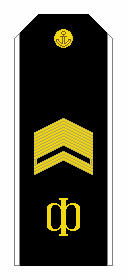
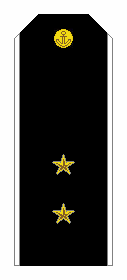
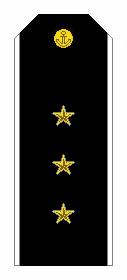
Enlisted personnel, NCOs and warrant officers (army and air force)
Designation	Enlisted personnel			NCOs				Warrant officers
Shoulder board to everyday & parade uniform Military space forces (until 1997), space forces (from 2001) & airborne troops
Shoulder board to everyday & parade uniform Air force
Shoulder board to everyday & parade uniform Ground forces & strategic missile troops
Shoulder board to field uniform all service branches
Rank designation (ground & air forces)	Officer cadet	Private	Senior private	Junior sergeant	Sergeant	Senior sergeant	Staff sergeant	Warrant officer	Senior warrant officer
Rank designation (ground & air forces)	Курсант	Рядовой	Ефрейтор	Младший сержант	Сержант	Старший сержант	Старшина	Прапорщик	Старший прапорщик
Enlisted personnel, NCOs and warrant officers navy and naval forces
Designation	Enlisted personnel			NCOs				Midshipmen
Shoulder board to everyday uniform
Shoulder board to parade uniform
Rating designation (naval services)	Officer cadet	Sailor	Senior sailor	Petty officer 2nd class	Petty officer 1st class	Chief petty officer	Chief petty officer of the ship	Midshipman	Senior midshipman
Rating designation (naval services)	Курсант	Матрос	Старший матрос	Старшина; 2 статьи	Старшина; 1 статьи	Главный старшина	Главный корабельный старшина	Мичман	Старший мичман
... (coastal services and other shore commands)	Officer cadet	Sailor	Senior sailor	Junior sergeant	Sergeant	Senior sergeant	Staff sergeant	Warrant officer	Senior warrant officer

=== Army, air force and naval officers ===
Shoulder boards up to company level

- One vertical stripe, padding with basic ornament (in longitudinal direction appliqued cords in piston-embroidery), metal stars (small 13 mm diameter); shoulder boards to field uniforms simple without basic ornament.

Shoulder boards to field officers/ staff officers

- Basic ornament identical to company level, two vertical stripes, metal stars (big 20 mm diameter).

Top level appointments

- Basic ornament longitudinal- and vertical embroidery, embroidered stars (diameter 22 mm).

Marshal of the Russian Federation

- Basic ornaments longitudinal-and vertical embroidery, one embroidered big star (diameter 40 mm), Coat of arms of Russia.

==== Officer insignia – army, air force, SMT, airborne and space forces ====
Rank group	General / flag officers						Senior officers			Junior officers
Parade uniform
Army and Strategic missile troops
Air force, Airborne troops and Space forces
Everyday uniform
Army and Strategic missile troops
Air force
Airborne troops and Space forces
Field uniform
All services
		(1997–2010)	(1994–1997)
Native name	Ма́ршал росси́йской федера́ции Márshal rossíyskoy federátsii	Генера́л а́рмии Generál ármii		Генера́л-полко́вник; Generál-polkóvnik	Генера́л-лейтена́нт; Generál-leytenánt	Генера́л-майо́р; Generál-mayór	Полко́вник; Polkóvnik	Подполко́вник; Podpolkóvnik	Майо́р; Majór	Kапита́н; Kapitán	Старший лейтена́нт Stárshiy leytenánt	Лейтенант; Leytenant	Mла́дший лейтена́нт Mládshiy leytenánt	Курсант; Kursant

==== Officer insignia – navy ====
Rank group	General / flag officers					Senior officers			Junior officers
Parade uniform
Service uniform
Winter uniform
Summer uniform
	(1997–2010)	(1994–1997)
Sleeve insignia
Native name	Адмирал флота Admiral flota		Адмирал; Admiral	Вице-адмирал; Vitse-admiral	Контр-адмирал; Contre-admiral	Капитан 1-го ранга Kapitan 1-go ranga	Капитан 2-го ранга Kapitan 2-go ranga	Капитан 3-го ранга Kapitan 3-go ranga	Капитан-лейтенант; Kapitan-leytenant	Старший лейтенант Starshey leytenant	Лейтенант; Leytenant	Младший лейтенант Mladshiy leytenant	Курсант; Kursant
Coastal services & shore commands			Генера́л-полко́вник; Generál-polkóvnik	Генера́л-лейтена́нт; Generál-leytenánt	Генера́л-майо́р; Generál-mayór	Полко́вник; Polkóvnik	Подполко́вник; Podpolkóvnik	Майо́р; Majór	Kапита́н; Kapitán	Старший лейтена́нт Stárshiy leytenánt	Лейтенант; Leytenant	Mла́дший лейтена́нт Mládshiy leytenánt	Курсант; Kursant

== See also ==
- History of Russian military ranks
- Ranks and insignia of the Imperial Russian Armed Forces
- Military ranks of the Soviet Union (1918–1935)
- Military ranks of the Soviet Union (1935–1940)
- Military ranks of the Soviet Union (1940–1943)
- Military ranks of the Soviet Union (1943–1955)
- Military ranks of the Soviet Union (1955–1991)
- Army ranks and insignia of the Russian Federation
- Naval ranks and insignia of the Russian Federation
