= Military ranks of the Soviet Union (1955–1991) =

The ranks and rank insignia of the Soviet Armed Forces between 1955 and 1991 were distinguished by the reorganisation of the Soviet armed forces after the death of Stalin, resulting in changes to ranks, insignia, and uniforms.

== Army and air forces ==
=== Shoulder straps to field utilization ===
In December 1956 the coloured border piping on officers' shoulder straps was changed. A cinnamon-brown color was used instead of the burgundy red previously worn by commanders and commanding officers. All other officers and other ranks wore corps colours as follows:

- Motorised & mechanised rifles – raspberry
- Artillery & armored troops – black, red
- Air Force & aviation – blue
- Technical troops of any kind and the navy – black

The regimental numberings of the 1943 system were removed altogether.

=== Non-commissioned officers and enlisted men ===
Rank group	Warrant officers		Non-commissioned officers					Enlisted men
Shoulder boards (motorized infantry troops)
Shoulder boards (artillery, rocket, tank, engineering, construction, automobile, railway troops, signal-corps, troops of radiation, chemical and biological protection)
Shoulder boards (air force & aviation)
	(introduced 1981)	(introduced 1971)	(from 1964)	(until 1963)
	Ста́рший пра́порщик Stárshiy práporshchik	Пра́порщик; Práporshchyk	Старшина́ Starshyná		Ста́рший сержа́нт Stárshiy serzhánt	Сержа́нт; Serzhánt	Мла́дший сержа́нт Mládshiy serzhánt	Ефре́йтор; Efréĭtor	Рядово́й; Ryadovóy
US equivalent	Chief warrant officer	Warrant officer	Command sergeant major		Sergeant major	Master sergeant	Sergeant	Private first class	Private

Colors by type of troops:

- motorized infantry troops – red (scarlet);
- artillery, rocket, tank, engineering, construction, automobile, railway troops, signal-corps, troops of radiation, chemical and biological protection – black;
- air force and airborne troops – sky blue;
- state security troops (KGB troops) – dark blue, instead of the letters "СА" (Советская Армия) the letters "ГБ" (Государственная Безопасность – State Security);
- internal troops (Interior Ministry troops) – crimson (dark red), instead of the letters "СА" (Советская Армия) the letters "ВВ" (Внутренние Войска);
- border troops – green, instead of the letters "СА" (Советская Армия) the letters "ПВ" (Пограничные Войска).

=== Officers ===
==== Marshals of the branch ====
The rank of Army general was only awarded to officers of the army from the infantry branch directly, all other branches and services were promoted to the ranks of marshal and chief marshal of the branch (equivalents, respectively, to the ranks of Army general and Marshal of the Soviet Union).

Rank	Chief marshal of the branch				
Insignia					
Rank designation	Главный маршал артиллерии Glavnyy marshal artillerii	Главный маршал авиации Glavnyy marshal aviatsii	Главный маршал бронетанковых войск Glavnyy marshal bronetankovykh voysk	Главный маршал войск связи Glavnyy marshal voysk svyazi	Главный маршал инженерных войск Glavnyy marshal inzhenernykh voysk
Translation	Chief marshal of artillery	Chief marshal of aviation	Chief marshal of the armoured troops	Chief marshal of the signal troops	Chief marshal of the engineer troops
Rank	Marshal of the branch				
Insignia					
Rank designation	Маршал артиллерии Marshal artillerii	Маршал авиации Marshal aviatsii	Маршал бронетанковых войск Marshal bronetankovykh voysk	Маршал войск связи Marshal voysk svyazi	Маршал инженерных войск Marshal inzhenernykh voysk
Translation	Marshal of artillery	Marshal of aviation	Marshal of the armoured troops	Marshal of the signal troops	Marshal of the engineer troops

==== Army officers and generals (all services) ====
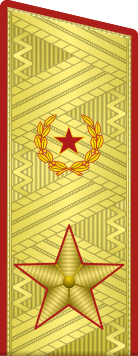
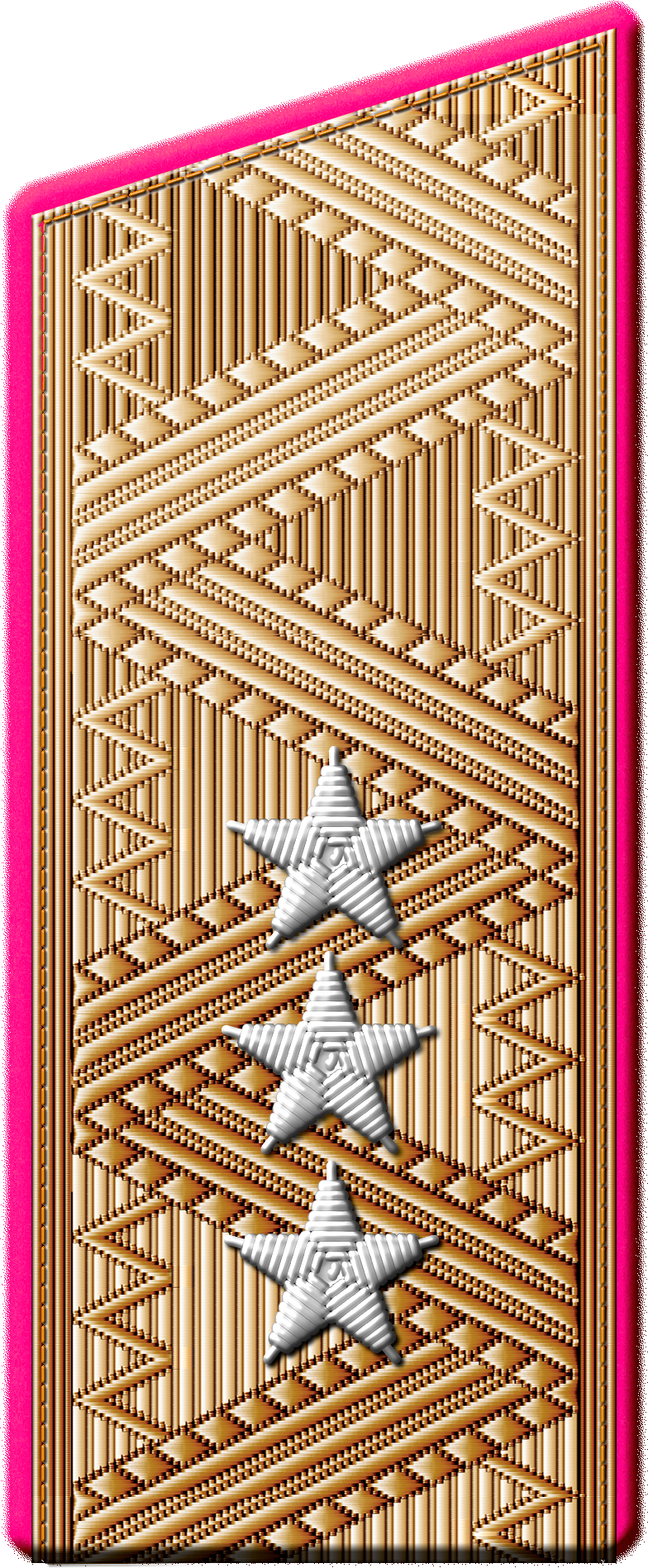
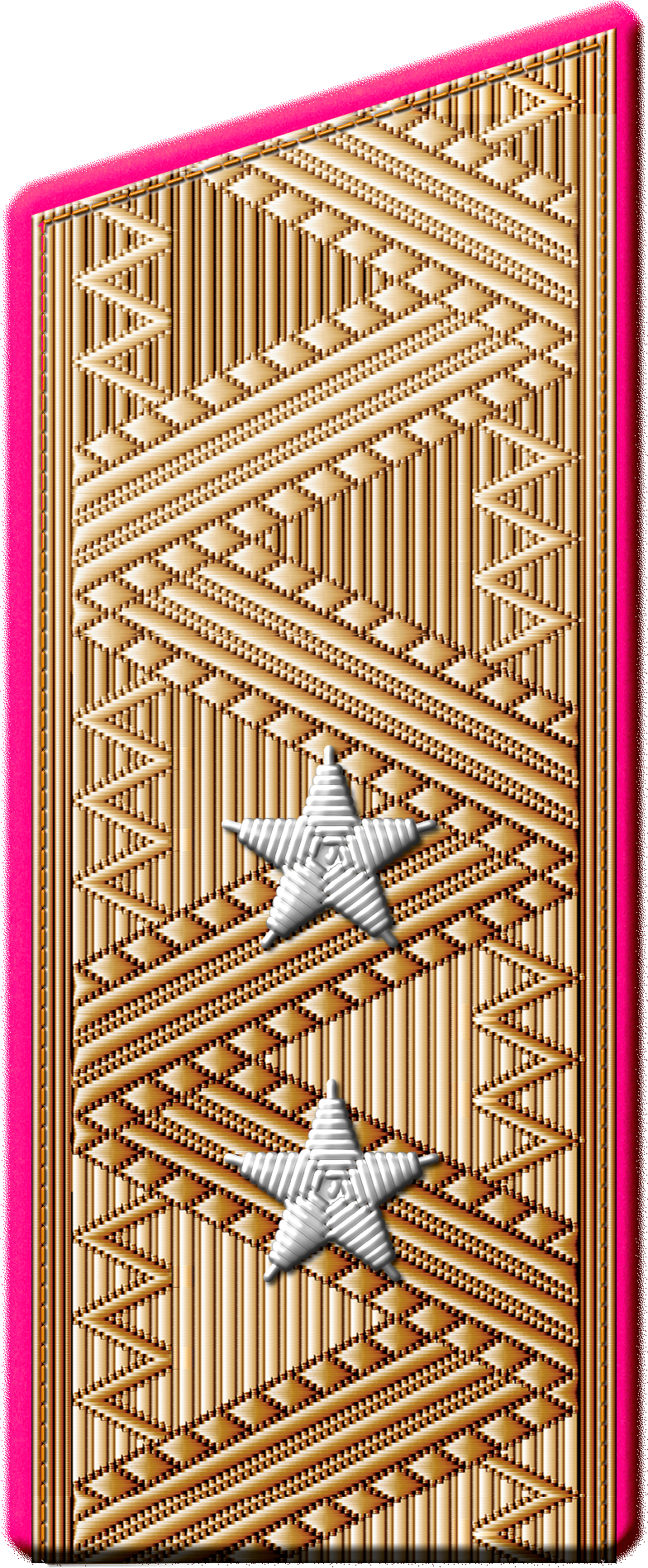
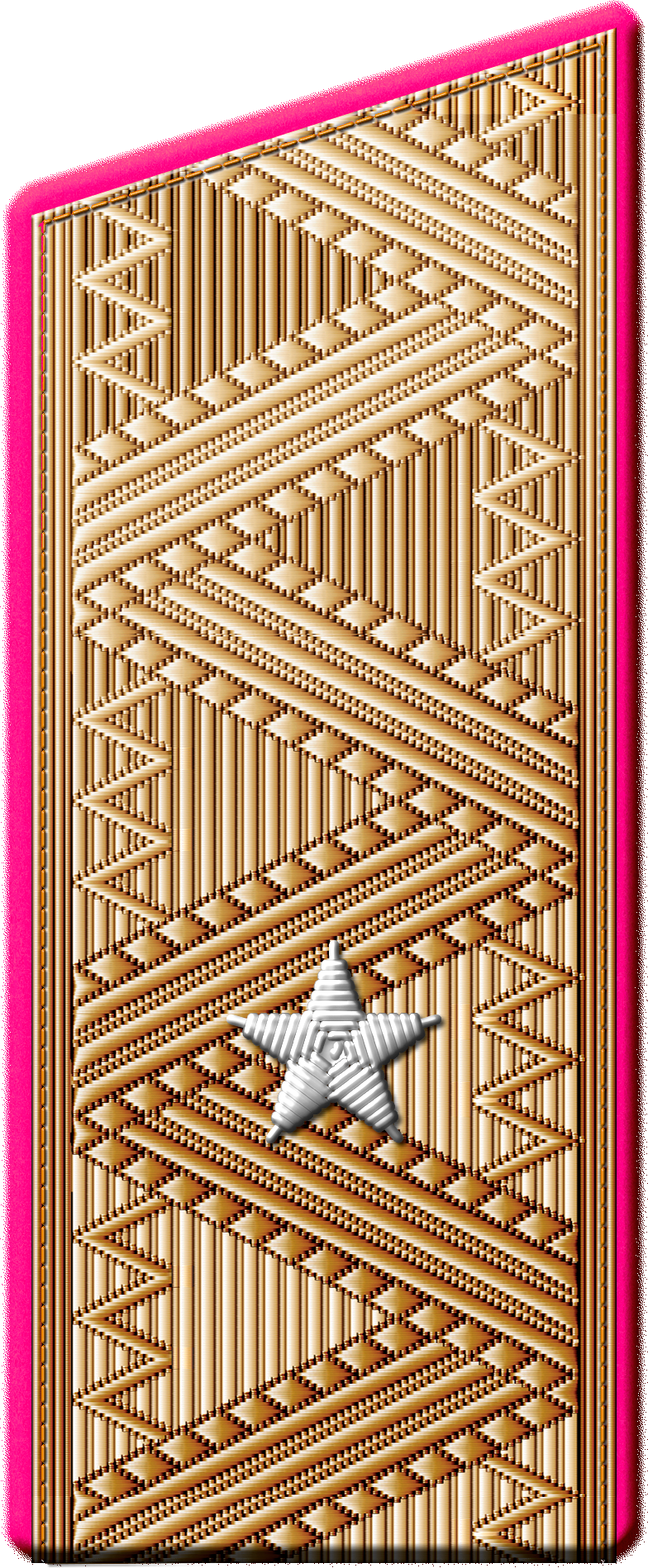
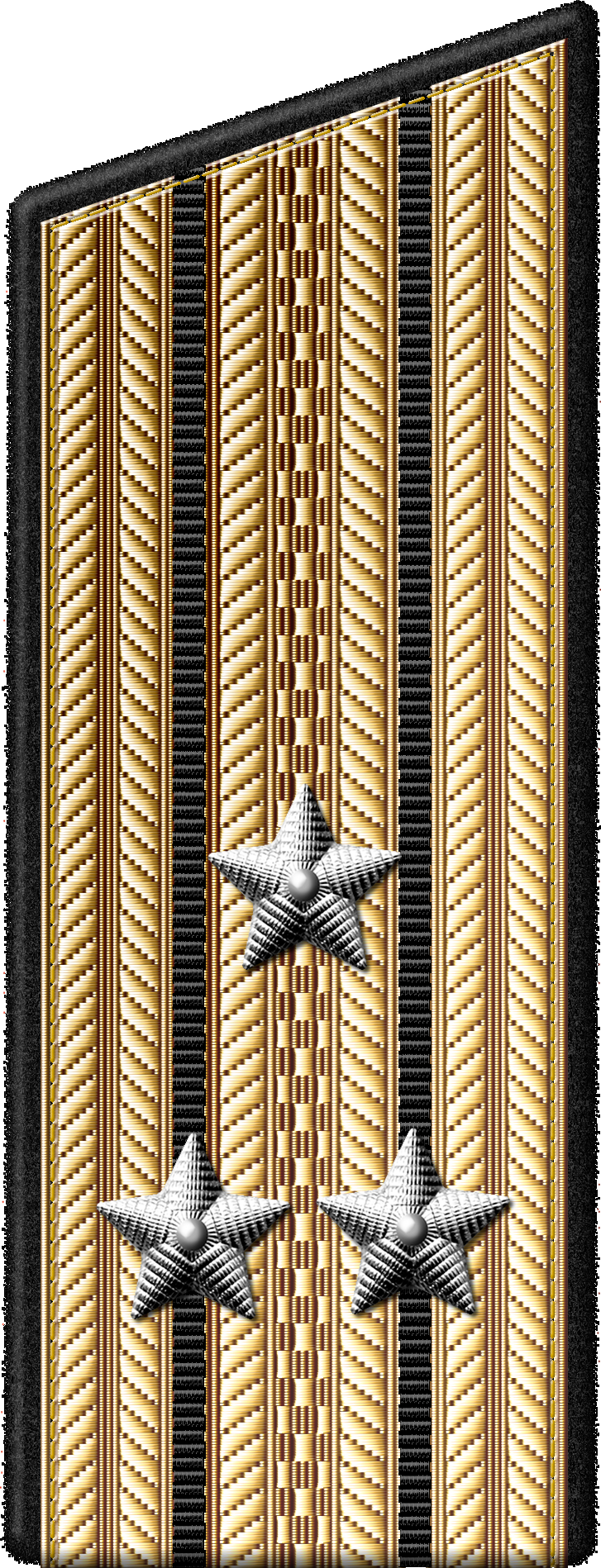
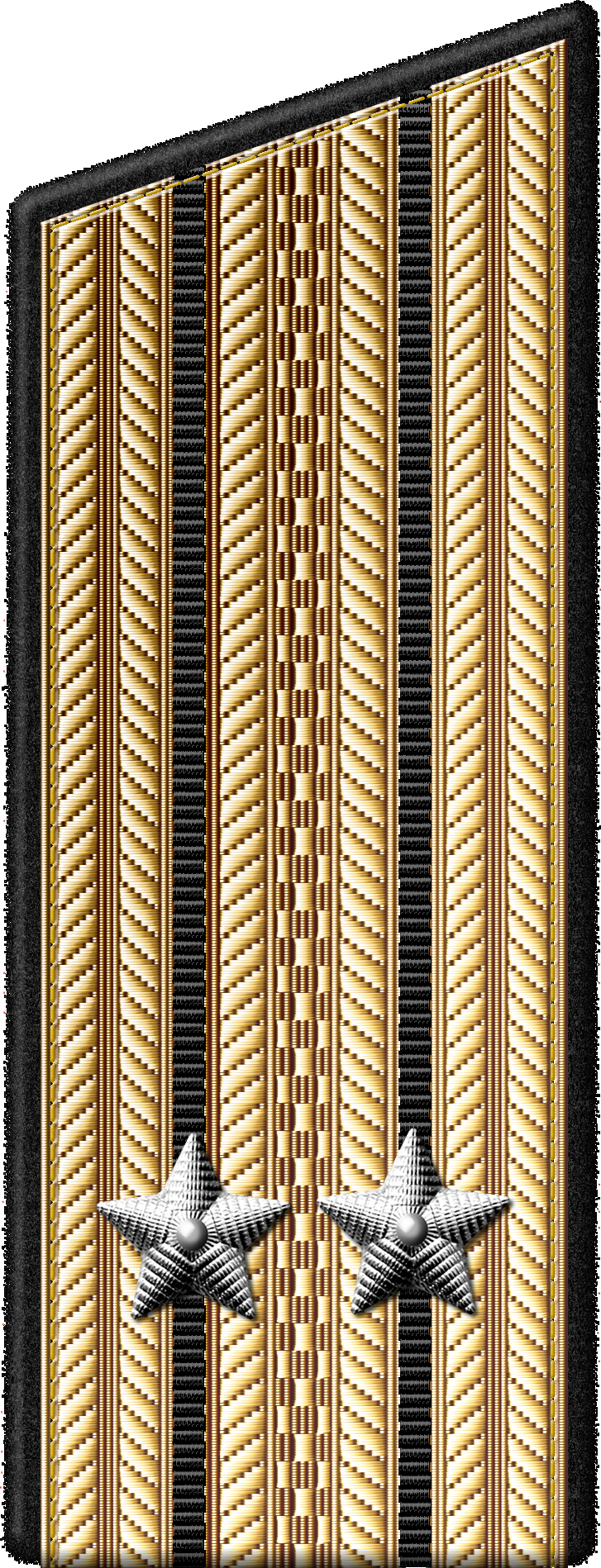
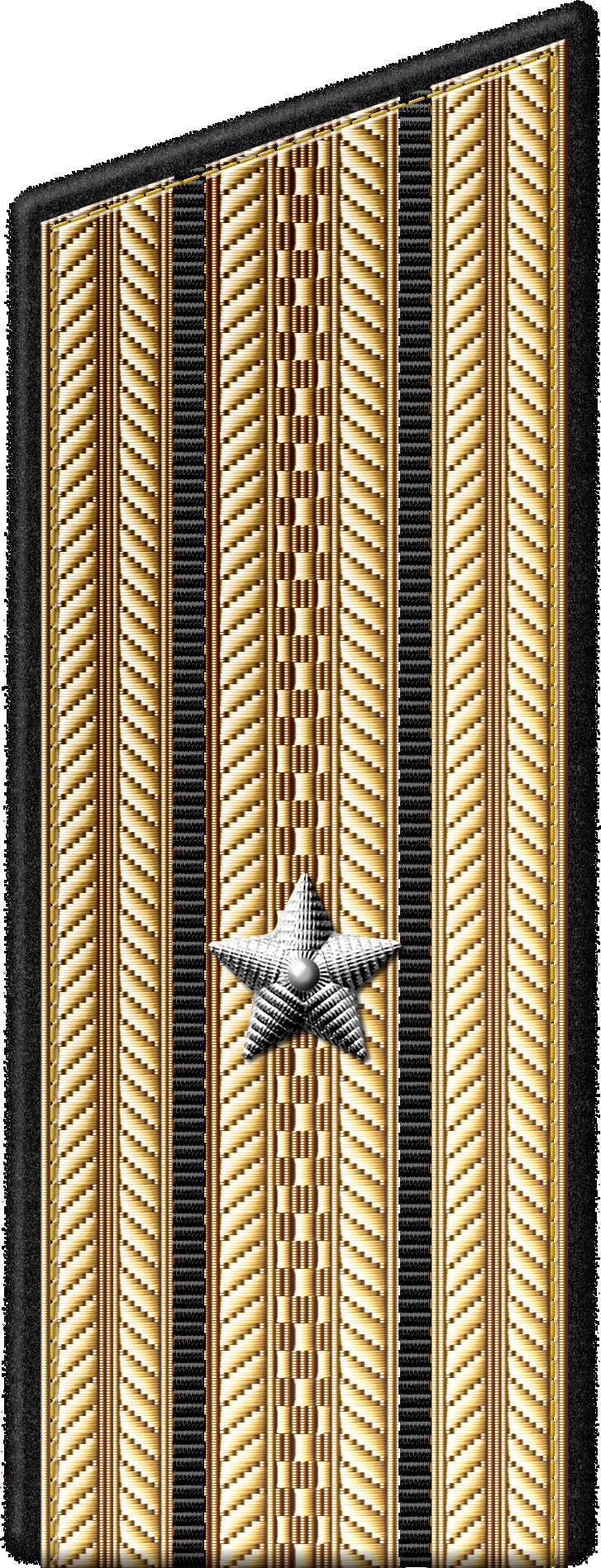
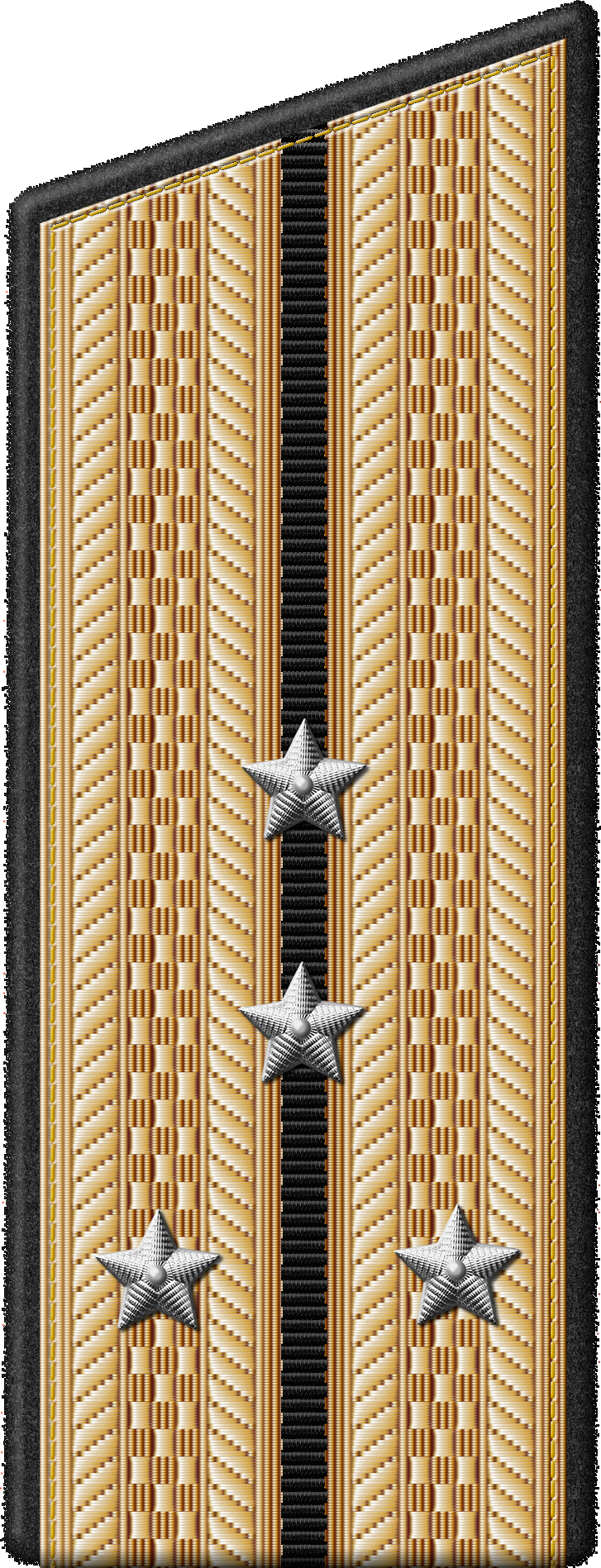
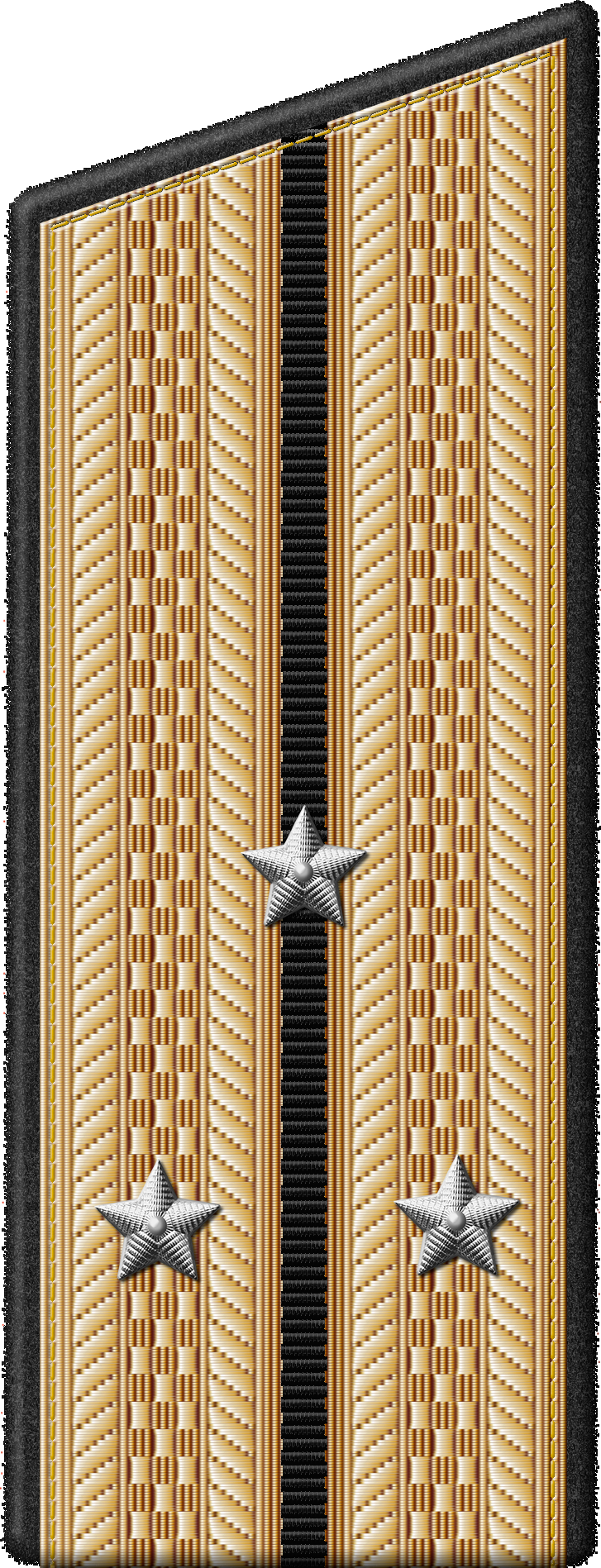
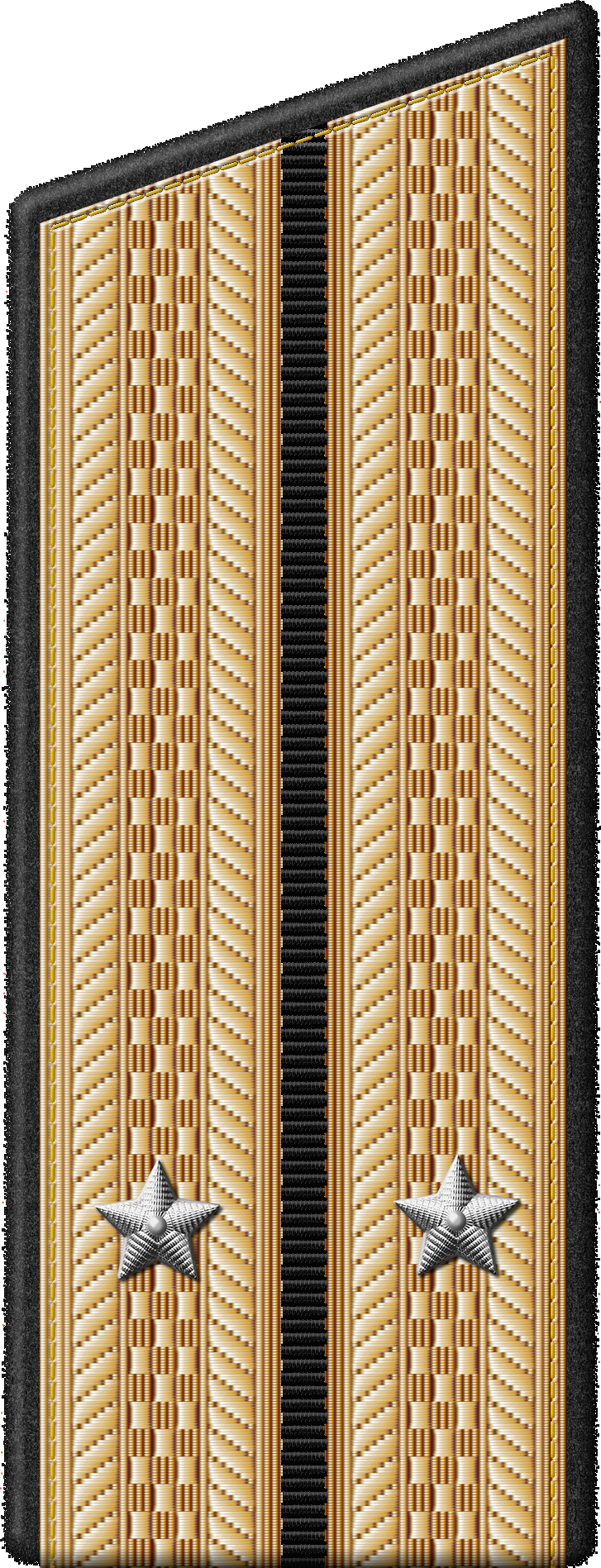
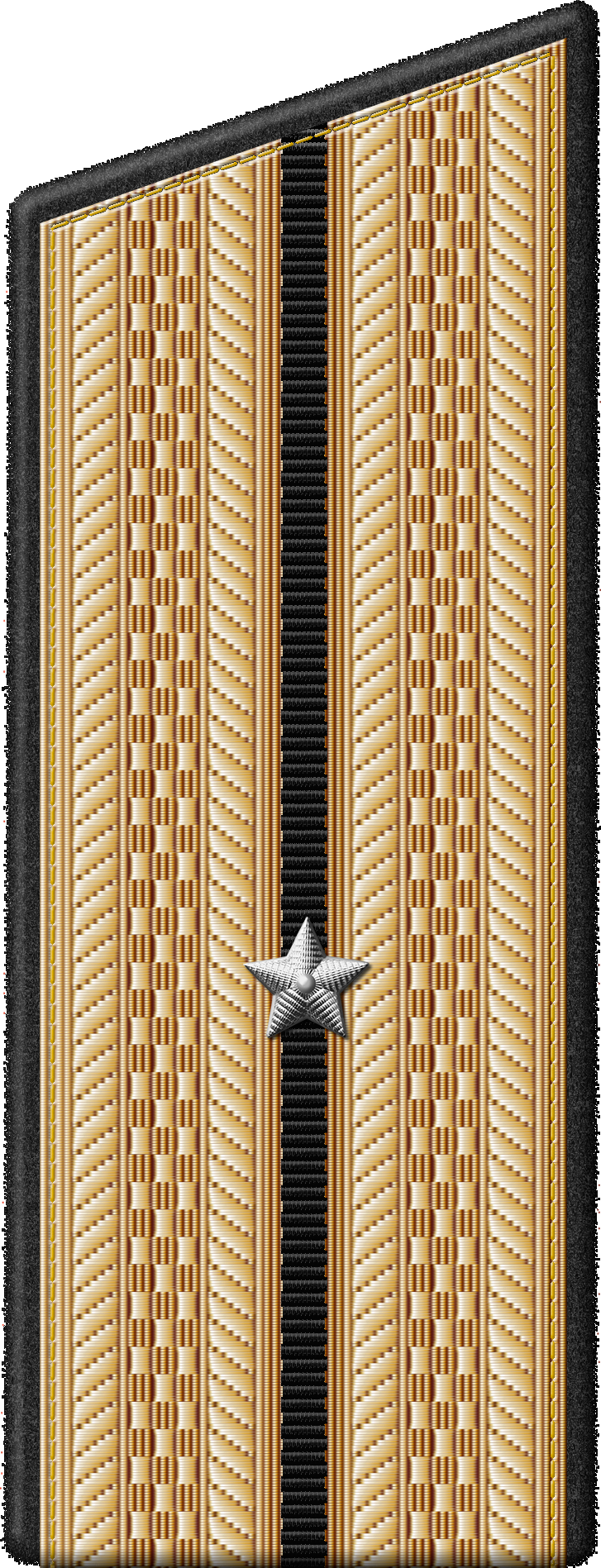
Rank group	General / flag officers						Senior officers			Junior officers
Shoulder boards (Ground forces)
Shoulder boards (Technical forces)	See above	See above
Shoulder boards (Air force)	See above	See above
		(from 1974)	(until 1974)
	Маршал советского союза Márshal sovetskogo soyuza	Генера́л а́рмии Generál ármii		Генера́л-полко́вник; Generál-polkóvnik	Генера́л-лейтена́нт; Generál-leytenánt	Генера́л-майо́р; Generál-mayór	Полко́вник; Polkóvnik	Подполко́вник; Podpolkóvnik	Майо́р; Majór	Kапита́н; Kapitán	Старший лейтена́нт Stárshiy leytenánt	Лейтенант; Leytenant	Mла́дший лейтена́нт Mládshiy leytenánt
US equivalent	General of the Army	General		Lieutenant general	Major general	Brigadier general	Colonel	Lieutenant colonel	Major	Captain	First lieutenant	Second lieutenant

==== Student officers ====
Rank group	Senior NCOs				Junior NCOs	Enlisted
Parade uniform
Army
Air force
	Курсант старшина́ Kursánt starshyná	Курсант ста́рший сержа́нт Kursánt stárshiy serzhánt	Курсант сержа́нт Kursánt serzhánt	Курсант мла́дший сержа́нт Kursánt mládshiy serzhánt	Курсант ефре́йтор Kursánt efréĭtor	Курсант; Kursánt
Translation	Cadet sergeant major	Cadet senior sergeant	Cadet sergeant	Cadet junior sergeant	Cadet first class	Cadet

== Navy ==
=== Ratings of the Navy, coastal services and other shore commands ===
Rank group	Warrant officers		Boatswain/petty officers					Enlisted men
Shoulder boards
	(introduced 1981)	(from 1971)	(from 1964)	(until 1963)
	Старший мичман Starshy michman	Мичман; Michman	Главный корабельный старшина Glavny korabelny starshina		Главный старшина Glavny starshina	Старшина 1 статьи Starshina 1 statie	Старшина 2 статьи Starshina 2 statie	Старший матрос Starshina matros	Матрос; Matros
			(Michman until 1971)
Coastal services & shore commands	Ста́рший пра́порщик Stárshiy práporshchik	Пра́порщик; Práporshchyk	Старшина́ Starshyná		Ста́рший сержа́нт Stárshiy serzhánt	Сержа́нт; Serzhánt	Мла́дший сержа́нт Mládshiy serzhánt	Старший матрос Starshina matros	Матрос; Matros
US equivalent	Chief warrant officer	Warrant officer	Fleet/force master chief petty officer		Senior chief petty officer	Chief petty officer	Petty officer second class	Seaman	Seaman recruit

==== Letter codes from 1972 onward ====
- The letter imprint "СА" on army shoulder boards stood for Советская Аpмия (Sovetskaya Armiya) and was the symbol of adherence to the Soviet Army.
- The letter imprint on Soviet navy shoulder boards symbolised the adherence to the appropriate fleet or naval major command.
  - Ф – Fleet (Russian: Флот, romanized: Flot), general personnel of the Navy
  - БФ – Baltic Fleet (Russian: Балтийский Флот, romanized: Baltiski flot)
  - ЧМ – Black Sea Fleet (Russian: Черноморский Флот, romanized: Chernomorski flot)
  - СФ – Northern Fleet (Russian: Северный Флот, romanized: Severny flot)
  - ТФ – Pacific Fleet (Russian: Тихоокеанский Флот, romanized: Tikhookeanski flot)
- Other letter symbols
  - ВВ – (Russian: Внутренние Войска, romanized: Vnutrennie voiska) – Internal Troops
  - ВМУ – (Russian: Военно-музыкальное Училище, romanized: Voyenno-musykalnoye Utchilishche) – students of military musician schools or cadets of military bands
- ВС – (Russian: Вооружённые Силы, romanized: Voorushonnye Sily) – armed forces (Soviet Army, later USSR armed forces, also Armed forces of the USSR)
- ГБ – (Russian: Госуда́рственной Безопа́сности, romanized: Gosudarstvennoy Bezopasnosti) – Committee for State Security (KGB)
- К – (Russian: Курсант, romanized: Kursant) – higher military college student
- Н – (Russian: Нахимовец, romanized: Nakhimovez) – cadet in the Nakhimov Naval School
- ПВ – (Russian: Пограничные войска, romanized: Pogranitshnye voiska) – border troops
- СШ – (Russian: Cпециальная школа, romanized: Spezialnaya shkola) – special school
- СВУ – (Russian: Суворовец, romanized: Suvorovez) – cadet at a Suvorov Military School

=== Naval officers and flag officers (all services) ===
Rank group	Flag officers						Senior officers			Junior officers
Shoulder board
		(from 1974)	(until 1974)
Sleeve insignia
	Адмирал флота советского союза Admiral flota sovietskogo soyuza	Адмирал флота Admiral flota		Адмирал; Admiral	Вице-адмирал; Vitse-admiral	Контр-адмирал; Contre-admiral	Капитан 1-го ранга Kapitan 1-go ranga	Капитан 2-го ранга Kapitan 2-go ranga	Капитан 3-го ранга Kapitan 3-go ranga	Капитан-лейтенант; Kapitan-leytenant	Старший лейтенант Starshey leytenant	Лейтенант; Leytenant	Младший лейтенант Mladshiy leytenant
		(from 1962)
Coastal services & shore commands				Генера́л-полко́вник; Generál-polkóvnik	Генера́л-лейтена́нт; Generál-leytenánt	Генера́л-майо́р; Generál-mayór	Полко́вник; Polkóvnik	Подполко́вник; Podpolkóvnik	Майо́р; Majór	Kапита́н; Kapitán	Старший лейтена́нт Stárshiy leytenánt	Лейтенант; Leytenant	Mла́дший лейтена́нт Mládshiy leytenánt
US equivalent	Fleet admiral	Admiral		Vice admiral	Rear admiral (upper half)	Rear admiral (lower half)	Captain	Commander	Lieutenant commander	Lieutenant	Lieutenant (junior grade)	Ensign	Midshipman

== See also ==
- History of Russian military ranks
- Ranks and insignia of the Imperial Russian Armed Forces
- Military ranks of the Soviet Union (1918–1935)
- Military ranks of the Soviet Union (1935–1940)
- Military ranks of the Soviet Union (1940–1943)
- Military ranks of the Soviet Union (1943–1955)
- Ranks and rank insignia of the Russian Federation´s armed forces 1994–2010

== Bibliography ==
- Barker, A. J. (1976). Soviet Army Uniforms & Insignia 1945-1975. London: Arms & Armour. ISBN 0-85368-390-5.
- Soper, Karl Wheeler (1991). "Armed Forces and Defence Organization". In Zickel, Raymond E. (ed.). Soviet Union: a country study. Area Handbook (2nd ed.). Washington, D.C.: Library of Congress. pp. 695–753. LCCN 90025756.
