= Captain 2nd rank =

Russian naval rank

Captain 2nd rank (Russian: капитан 2-го ранга, romanized: kapitan vtorogo ranga, lit. 'captain of the 2nd rank') is a rank used by the Russian Navy and a number of former communist states. The rank is the middle rank in the staff officer's career group. The rank is equivalent to lieutenant colonel in armies and air forces. Within NATO forces, the rank is rated as OF-4 and is equivalent to commander in English-speaking navies.

== Russia ==
Captain 2nd rank Капитан 2-го ранга
- Uniform shoulder strap and sleeve (2013–present)
- Country: Russia
- Service branch: Russian Navy
- Rank group: Staff officer
- Formation: 1722
- Next higher rank: Captain 1st rank
- Next lower rank: Captain 3rd rank
- Equivalent ranks: Lieutenant colonel

=== Russian Empire ===
The rank was introduced in Russia by Peter the Great in 1722. From the introduction of the Russian table of ranks to the abolishment in 1917 Captain 2nd rank was quoted to rank positioned VII, and until 1856 it was privileged by hereditary nobility. In the Russian Empire Navy it was the second highest rank of the stab-ofizer (derived from German Stabsoffizier) career group.

=== Soviet Navy and Russian Federation ===
The first equivalent rank in the Soviet Navy (from 1918 to 1935) was Starpom of the ship 1st rank, (Russian: Старпом корабля 1 ранга, lit. 'Senior assistant of the ship (commander) 1st rank').

This particular rank was introduced by disposal of the Central Executive Committee of the Soviet Union and the Council of People's Commissars, from September 22, 1935. The Red Army reintroduced the Captain 2nd rank rank in 1935, together with a number of other former Russian ranks, and it has been used in many ex-USSR countries, including Russia, to the present day.

Pertaining to Engineer aboard of war ships the equivalent rank designation in the Soviet Navy was Captain 2nd rank-engineer. Any other naval personnel on-shore assignments (e.g. medical service, chemical defence, marines, and naval aviation) have been entitled Podpolkovnik.

In the navy of the Russian Federation there are three ranks in the staff officer´s (until 1917: stab-ofizer, derived from German Stabsoffizier) career group, which means:

- Captain 1st rank
- Captain 2nd rank
- Captain 3rd rank

Sequence of ranks in Russian Federation´s navy
junior rank: Captain 3rd rank	Captain 2nd rank	senior rank: Captain 1st rank

Types of rank insignia Captain 2nd rank

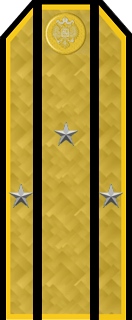
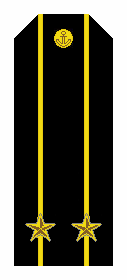
Rank	Imperial Russian Navy	Soviet Navy			Russian Navy
insignia shoulder sleeve						55px
	shoulder parade 1909–1917	Ship commander 1st rank (Командир корабля 1-ого ранга) sleeve 1918–1935	Captain 1st rank sleeve 1935–1991	shoulder parade 1955-1991	... parade 1994–2010	... parade 1994–2010 to white shirt	... everyday 1994–2010	... parade since 2010

== Captain 2nd rank insignia ==
Kapiten Rangut II
(Albanian Naval Force)

Ikinci dərəcəli kapitan
(Azerbaijani Navy)

Капитан II ранг
Kapitan II rang
(Bulgarian Navy)

Екінші дәрежелі капитан
Ekinşi därejeli kapïtan
(Kazakh Naval Forces)

Капитан 1-го ранга
Kapitan 1-go ranga
(Russian Navy)

2-nji derejeli kapitan
(Turkmen Naval Forces)

Капітан II рангу
Kapitan II ranhu
(Ukrainian Navy)

II rang kapitani
(Uzbek River Force)

== See also ==
- History of Russian military ranks
- Ranks and rank insignia of the Russian armed forces until 1917
- Ranks and rank insignia of the Red Army 1918–1935, ... 1935–1940 and ... 1940–1943
- Ranks and rank insignia of the Soviet Army 1943–1955 and Ranks and rank insignia of the Soviet Army 1955–1991,
- Ranks and rank insignia of the Russian Federation´s armed forces 1994–2010
- Naval ranks and insignia of the Russian Federation
