= Captain 3rd rank =

Russian Navy Rank

Captain 3rd rank (Russian: капитан 3-го ранга, romanized: kapitan 3-go ranga, lit. 'captain of the 3rd rank') is a rank used by the Russian Navy and a number of former communist states. The rank is the lowest rank in the staff officer's career group. The rank is equivalent to major in armies and air forces. Within NATO forces, the rank is rated as OF-3 and is equivalent to lieutenant commander in English speaking navies.

== Russia ==
Captain 3rd rank Капитан 3-го ранга
- Uniform shoulder strap and sleeve (2013–present)
- Country: Russia
- Service branch: Russian Navy
- Rank group: Staff officer
- Formation: 1935
- Next higher rank: Captain 2nd rank
- Next lower rank: Captain lieutenant
- Equivalent ranks: Major

- Captain 1st rank
- Captain 2nd rank
- Captain 3rd rank

== Captain 3rd rank insignia ==
Kapiten Rangut III
(Albanian Naval Force)

Üçüncü dərəcəli kapitan
(Azerbaijani Navy)

Капитан III ранг
Kapitan III rang
(Bulgarian Navy)

Үшінші дәрежелі капитан
Üşinşi därejeli kapïtan
(Kazakh Naval Forces)

Капитан 3-го ранга
Kapitan 3-go ranga
(Russian Navy)

3-nji derejeli kapitan
(Turkmen Naval Forces)

Капітан III рангу
Kapitan III ranhu
(Ukrainian Navy)

III rang kapitani
(Uzbek River Force)

== See also ==
- History of Russian military ranks
- Ranks and rank insignia of the Russian armed forces until 1917
- Ranks and rank insignia of the Red Army 1918–1935, ... 1935–1940 and ... 1940–1943
- Ranks and rank insignia of the Soviet Army 1943–1955 and Ranks and rank insignia of the Soviet Army 1955–1991,
- Ranks and rank insignia of the Russian Federation´s armed forces 1994–2010
- Naval ranks and insignia of the Russian Federation
