= Glavny starshina =

Russian Navy's second highest rank in the petty officer career group

Glavny starshina (Russian: Гла́вный старшина́, romanized: glávnyy starshiná, IPA: [ˈɡlavnɨj stərʂɨˈna], lit. 'chief elder') is a rank used by the Russian Navy and a number of former communist states. The rank is the second most senior rank in the non-commissioned officer's career group. The rank is equivalent to senior sergeant in armies and air forces. Within NATO forces, the rank is rated as OR-7 and is equivalent to chief petty officer in English speaking navies.

== Russia ==
Glavny starshina Гла́вный старшина́
- shoulder board and sleeve insignia
- Country: Russia
- Service branch: Russian Navy
- Rank group: Petty officer
- Formation: 1940
- Next higher rank: Glavny starshina of the ship
- Next lower rank: Starshina 1st stage
- Equivalent ranks: Senior sergeant

The rank was introduced to the Soviet Navy in 1940.

In the navy of the Russian Federation there are four ranks in the petty officer's career group, which means:

- Glavny starshina of the ship
- Glavny starshina
- Starshina 1st stage
- Starshina 2nd stage

=== Insignia change ===
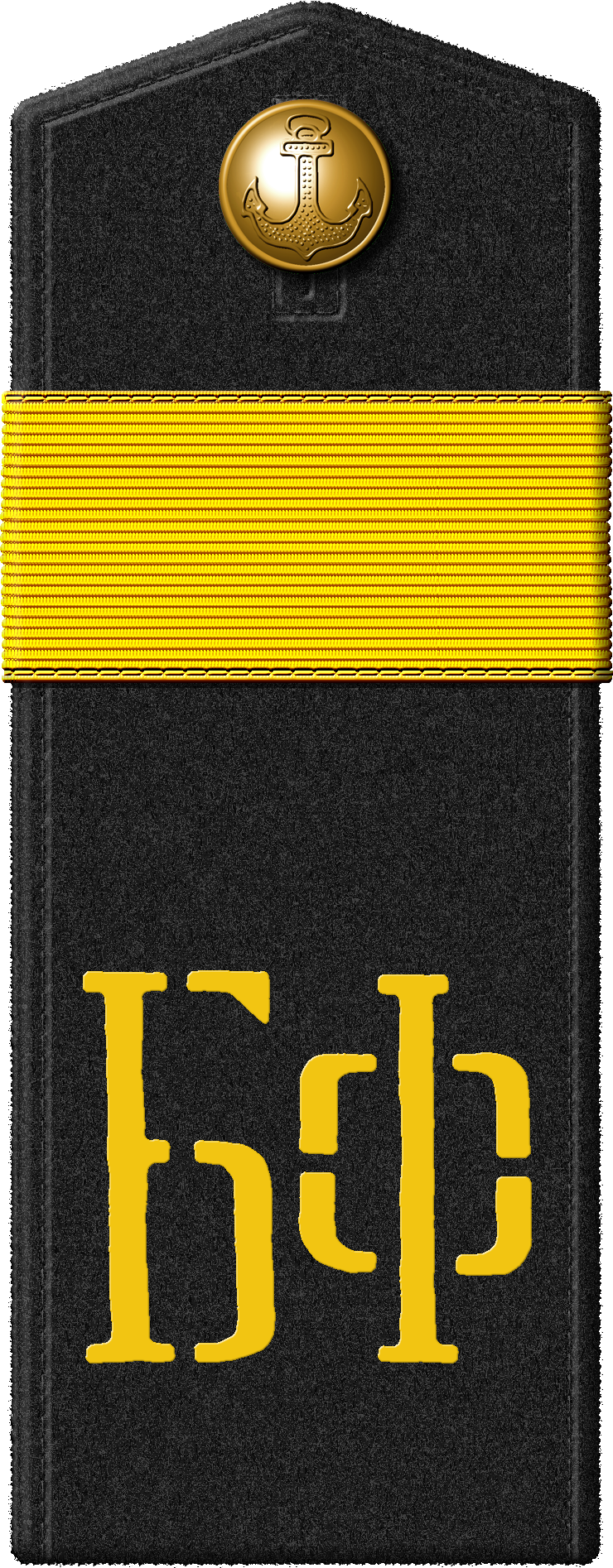
Year	1940	1943	1955	1991	2010
Insignia

== Insignia ==
Главен старшина
Glaven starshina
(Bulgarian Navy)

Бас старшина
Bas starshyna
(Kazakh Naval Forces)

Главный старшина
Glavny starshina
(Russian Navy)

Baş starşina
(Turkmen Naval Forces)

Головний старшина
Holovnyy starshyna
(Ukrainian Navy)

Bosh starshina
(Uzbek River Force)

== See also ==
- Ranks and rank insignia of the Red Army 1940–1943
- Ranks and rank insignia of the Soviet Army 1943–1955, ... 1955–1991
- Ranks and rank insignia of the Russian Federation´s armed forces 1994–2010
- Naval ranks and insignia of the Russian Federation
