= Starshina 1st class =

Russian Navy's highest rank in the petty officer career group

Starshina 1st class (Russian: Старшина́ пе́рвой статьи́, romanized: Starshiná pérvoy stat'í, lit. 'Older first article') is a rank used by the Russian Navy and a number of former communist states. The rank is a non-commissioned officer and is equivalent to sergeant in armies and air forces. Within NATO forces, the rank is rated as OR-6 and is equivalent to petty officer first class in English speaking navies.

== Russia ==
Starshina 1st class Старшина́ пе́рвой статьи́
- shoulder board and sleeve insignia
- Country: Russia
- Service branch: Russian Navy
- Rank group: Petty officer
- Formation: 2 November 1940
- Next higher rank: Glavny starshina
- Next lower rank: Starshina 2nd class
- Equivalent ranks: Sergeant

The rank was introduced to the Soviet Navy on 2 November 1940.

In the navy of the Russian Federation there are four ranks in the petty officer career group:

- Glavny starshina of the ship
- Glavny starshina
- Starshina 1st class
- Starshina 2nd class

=== Insignia change ===
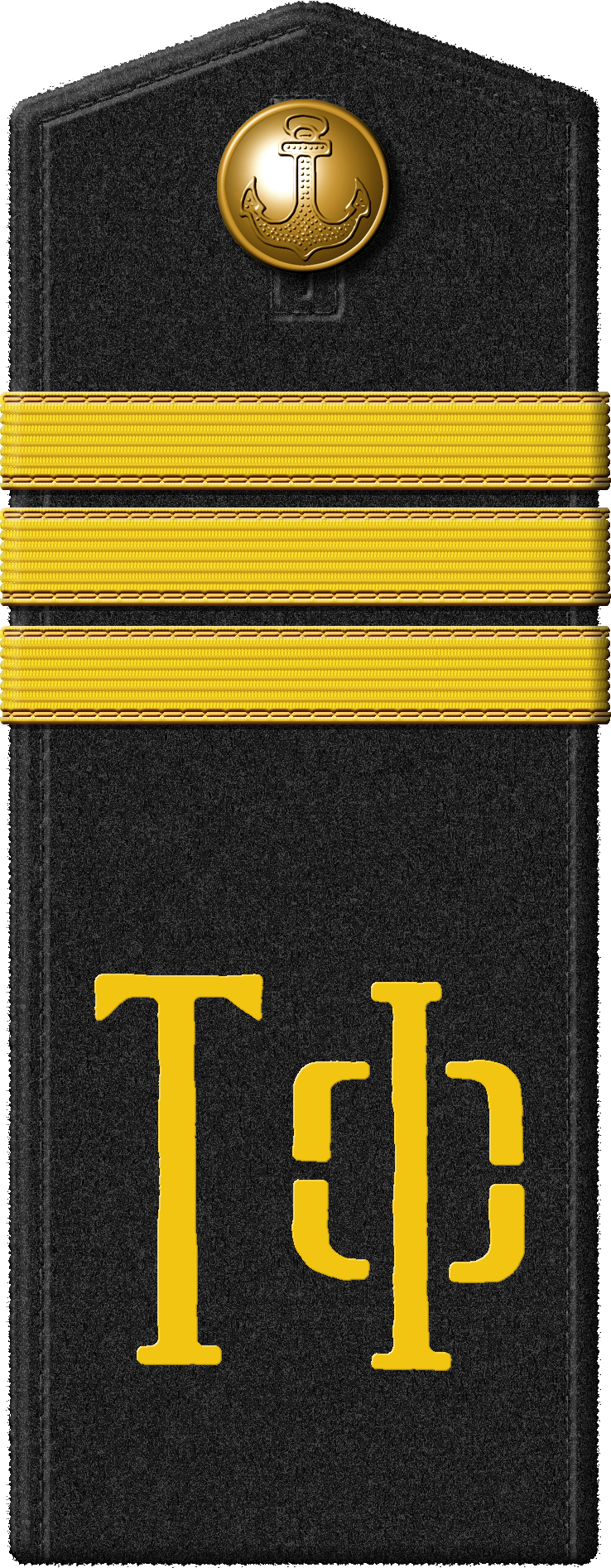
Year	1940	1943	1955	1991	2010
Insignia

== Insignia ==
Birinci starşina
(Azerbaijani Navy)

Старшина 1 степен
Starshina 1 stepen
(Bulgarian Navy)

Бірінші сатылы старшина
Birinşi satılı starşïna
(Kazakh Naval Forces)

Старшина́ пе́рвой статьи́
Starshiná pérvoy stat'í
(Russian Navy)

Birinji basgançakly starşina
(Turkmen Naval Forces)

Старшина 1-ої статті
Starshyna 1-oyi statti
(Ukrainian Navy)

I darajali starshina
(Uzbek River Force)

== See also ==
- Ranks and rank insignia of the Red Army 1940–1943
- Ranks and rank insignia of the Soviet Army 1943–1955, ... 1955–1991
- Ranks and rank insignia of the Russian Federation's armed forces 1994–2010
- Naval ranks and insignia of the Russian Federation
