= Military ranks of the Soviet Union (1940–1943) =

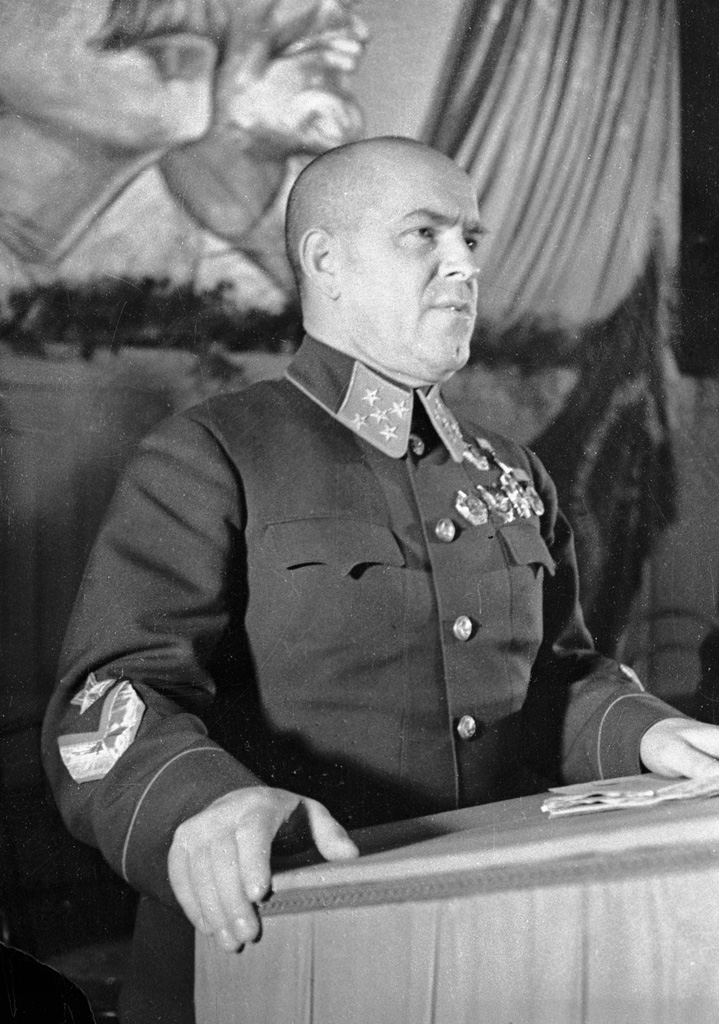
Georgy Zhukov in 1941, wearing the insignia of a Soviet army general

The ranks and rank insignia of the Red Army and Red Navy between 1940 and 1943 were characterised by continuing reforms to the Soviet armed forces in the period immediately before Operation Barbarossa and the war of national survival following it. The Soviet suspicion of rank and rank badges as a bourgeois institution remained, but the increasing experience of Soviet forces, and the massive increase in manpower all played their part, including the creation of a number of new general officer ranks and the reintroduction of permanent enlisted ranks and ratings.

== Change of military rank insignia ==
From May 1940 the introduction of general ranks in the Red Army and flag officer ranks in the Soviet Navy was officially sanctioned, by decree of the Presidium of the Supreme Soviet. The following general officer ranks were introduced with corresponding insignia:

- High level force commanding staff — major general, lieutenant general, colonel general and general of the army
- Artillery commanders — major general of the artillery, lieutenant general of the artillery and colonel general of the artillery
- Air force commanders (including naval aviation) — major general of aviation, lieutenant general of the aviation, and colonel general of aviation
- Armoured corps commanders — major general of the armoured corps, lieutenant general of the armoured corps, and colonel general of the armoured corps
- Communications troops commanders — major general of the communications troops, lieutenant general of the communications troops and colonel general of the communications troops
- Engineer troops commanders — major general of the engineer troops, lieutenant general of the engineer troops and colonel general of the engineer troops
- Commanding staff of other arms and services (including: chemical, railway, transport and military cartography) — major general of the technical troops, lieutenant general of the technical troops, and colonel general of the technical troops
- Leading staff of the commissariat service — major general of the commissariat service, lieutenant general of the commissariat service, and colonel general of the commissariat service
- Flag officers of the Soviet Navy — rear admiral, vice admiral, admiral, and admiral of the fleet
- Generals of the Soviet Navy on coastal service — major general of the coastal service, lieutenant general of the coastal service, and colonel general of the coastal service
- Engineer flag officers of the Soviet Navy — rear admiral engineer, vice admiral engineer, and admiral engineer

On 4 June 1940, the first promotions to the newly established ranks were made. First to be promoted to the rank of army general were Georgy Zhukov, Kirill Meretskov and Ivan Tyulenev. The rank insignia that characterized it were as follows:

- Gorget patch: One large star in gold embroidery, on the lower part two round laurel twigs and the hammer & sickle emblem.
- Sleeve: One large star in gold embroidery, red piping, below a red coloured chevron in gold embroidery, surrounded by two gold laurel-twigs with red piping.

The rank of Marshal of the Soviet Union, established in September 1935, remained unchanged. What would become a future rank system started to take shape with the promotion of the first Marshal of Artillery in early 1943, with the collar patch of a Marshal but in black.

With the new rank regulations came the reintroduction of the Yefreytor rank to the Army and Air Force and the introduction of new ratings for the Navy: Leading Red Fleet Man (naval services) and Yefreytor (coastal services).

== Ranks and rank insignia ==
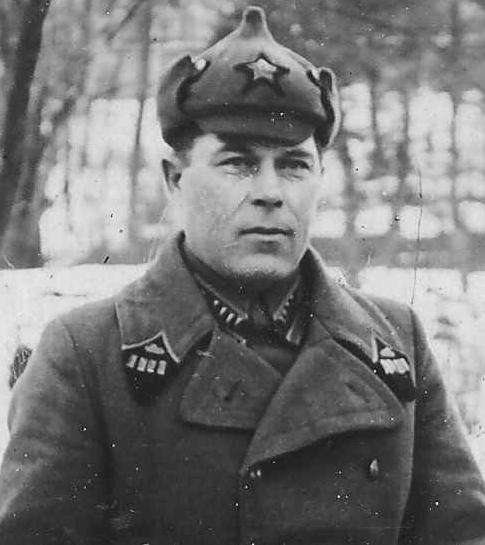
Example Polkovnik armoured corps with rank insignia big (coat), small (battle jacket) 1940.

The general intention of rejecting traditional rank insignia (as opposed to the epaulettes and shoulder boards of Imperial Russian forces) was maintained. The large gorget patches were modified. The rhombic patches previously used by generals were replaced by one five-pointed golden star. A new emblem, the symbol of a particular branch of service, was added. The general's star remained slightly smaller than the marshal's star.

The small gorget patches, mounted on the tunic (or gymnastyorka), remained unchanged, but they were made in the corps colour and contained an emblem to indicate the branch of service or special appointment. The previously- used gold coloured rank chevrons for general ranks were retained with small modifications.

=== Corps colours, emblems ===
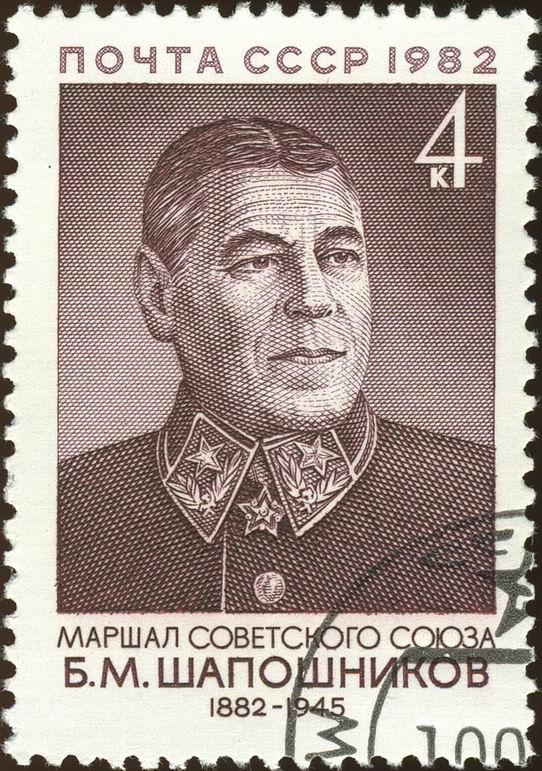
Gorget patches 1943 as seen on a stamp of Boris Shaposhnikov

The corps colours of 1935 were maintained, with minor changes.

Trouser stripes, gorget rank insignia and cap piping was given to general officers and marshals of the Soviet Union:

- Marshal of the Soviet Union and generic force commanders and commanding generals: deep red trouser stripes
- Artillery and armour generals: black gorgets with red piping and deep red trouser stripes
- Air force: Blue gorgets
- Generals of communication troops, engineer troops, technical troops and the commissariat service: Crimson gorgets

The rank of general of the artillery, of armoured troops, of the air force, of communication troops, of engineer troops, of technical troops and of the commissariat service wore on the gorget the appropriate emblem of their branch of service, special force, or assignment. Corps colour, typical to the branch of service were:

- Infantry: Raspberry
- Artillery and transport troops: Black
- Air force and air defence: Blue
- Cavalry: Dark blue
- Rear services (supply, maintenance, transport, medical, etc.): Dark green
- Ministry of the interior and state security:
  - Border troops: Light green
  - State security: Blue
  - All others: Chestnut-brown

=== Rank insignia of the army and air force ===
==== Higher, senior and middle commanders ====
Designation		Higher commanders					Senior commanders				Middle-level commanders
Rank insignia	Collar
Rank insignia	Gymnastjorka
Rank insignia	Sleeve
		Маршал советского союза Márshal sovetskogo soyuza	Генера́л а́рмии Generál ármii	Генера́л-полко́вник; Generál-polkóvnik	Генера́л-лейтена́нт; Generál-leytenánt	Генера́л-майо́р; Generál-mayór	Полко́вник; Polkóvnik	Подполко́вник; Podpolkóvnik	Майо́р; Majór	Kапита́н; Kapitán	Старший лейтена́нт Stárshiy leytenánt	Лейтенант; Leytenant	Mла́дший лейтена́нт Mládshiy leytenánt
Contemporary US equivalent		General of the Army	General	Lieutenant general	Major general	Brigadier general	Colonel	Lieutenant colonel	Major	Captain	First lieutenant	Second lieutenant

==== Junior commanders and enlisted men ====
Designation		Junior commanders				Enlisted men
Rank insignia	Coat-collar
Rank insignia	Gymnastjorka
		Старшина́ Starshyná	Ста́рший сержа́нт Stárshiy serzhánt	Сержа́нт; Serzhánt	Мла́дший сержа́нт Mládshiy serzhánt	Ефре́йтор; Efréĭtor	Красноармеец; Krasnoarmeyets
Contempoary US equivalent		Command sergeant major	Sergeant major	Master sergeant	Sergeant	Private first class	Private

=== Rank insignia of the Soviet Navy 1940–1943 ===
==== Officers ====
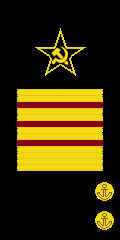
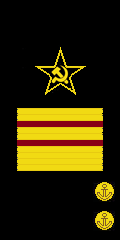
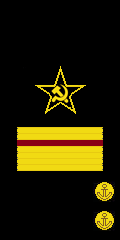
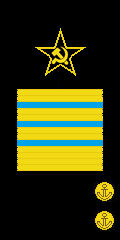
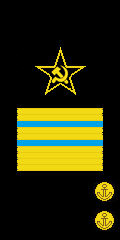
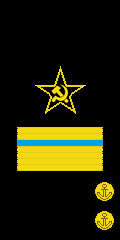
Rank group	Flag officers				Senior officers			Junior officers
Sleeve insignia
Sleeve insignia	Адмирал флота Admiral flota	Адмирал; Admiral	Вице-адмирал; Vitse-admiral	Контр-адмирал; Contre-admiral	Капитан 1-го ранга Kapitan 1-go ranga	Капитан 2-го ранга Kapitan 2-go ranga	Капитан 3-го ранга Kapitan 3-go ranga	Капитан-лейтенант; Kapitan-leytenant	Старший лейтенант Starshey leytenant	Лейтенант; Leytenant	Младший лейтенант Mladshiy leytenant
Coastal services
Shore commands
Shore commands		Генера́л-полко́вник; Generál-polkóvnik	Генера́л-лейтена́нт; Generál-leytenánt	Генера́л-майо́р; Generál-mayór	Полко́вник; Polkóvnik	Подполко́вник; Podpolkóvnik	Майо́р; Majór	Kапита́н; Kapitán	Старший лейтена́нт Stárshiy leytenánt	Лейтенант; Leytenant	Mла́дший лейтена́нт Mládshiy leytenánt
Contempoary US equivalent	Admiral	Vice Admiral	Rear Admiral (upper half)	Rear Admiral (lower half)	Captain	Commander	Lieutenant commander	Lieutenant	Lieutenant (junior grade)	Ensign

===== Lower commanding staff and enlisted ratings =====
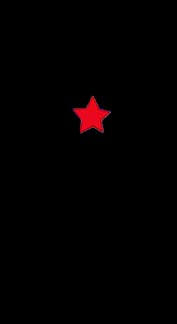
Designation	Lower commanding staff and specialists				Enlisted men
Sleeve insignia
	Мичман; Mičman	Главный старшина Glavny starshina	Старшина 1 статьи Starshina 1 statie	Старшина 2 статьи Starshina 2 statie	Старший краснофлотец Starshiy krasnoflotets	Краснофлотец; Krasnoflotets
Coastal services & shore commands	Старшина́ Starshyná	Ста́рший сержа́нт Stárshiy serzhánt	Сержа́нт; Serzhánt	Мла́дший сержа́нт Mládshiy serzhánt	Старший краснофлотец Starshiy krasnoflotets	Краснофлотец; Krasnoflotets
Contempoary US equivalent	Fleet/force master chief petty officer	Senior chief petty officer	Chief petty officer	Petty officer second class	Seaman	Seaman recruit

The 1940 regulations reinstated ground force-style ranks to the coastal services of the Navy.

== See also ==
- History of Russian military ranks
- Ranks and insignia of the Imperial Russian Armed Forces
- Military ranks of the Soviet Union (1918–1935)
- Military ranks of the Soviet Union (1935–1940)
- Military ranks of the Soviet Union (1943–1955)
- Military ranks of the Soviet Union (1955–1991)
- Ranks and rank insignia of the Russian Federation's armed forces 1994–2010
