= Kazakh Naval Forces =

Maritime forces of Kazakhstan

- Kazakh: Қазақстан Республикасының Әскери-теңіз күштері Qazaqstan Respublikasynyñ Äskeri-teñız küşterı Russian: Военно-морские силы Республики Казахстан
- Kazakh naval emblem
- Founded: 2 April 1993
- Country: Kazakhstan
- Type: Navy
- Size: 3,000 sailors and 14 patrol boats
- Part of: Armed Forces of the Republic of Kazakhstan
- Headquarters: Aktau, Mangystau Region
- Colors: Yellow, blue, black, and white
- Anniversaries: April 2 May 7

Commanders
- Supreme Commander-in-Chief: Kassym-Jomart Tokayev
- Commander-in-Chief of the Naval Forces: Vacant

Insignia
- Naval ensign

- Naval ensign of the Border Service

- Naval jack of Kazakhstan

The Kazakh Naval Forces (Kazakh: Қазақстан Әскери-теңіз күштері, Qazaqstan Äskeri-teñız küşterı; Russian: Военно-морские силы Казахстана) is the naval force responsible for coastal defense, naval special warfare, and naval warfare branch of the Armed Forces of the Republic of Kazakhstan. The navy mainly operates on the Caspian Sea and is currently based in the coastal city of Aktau.

The branch currently has a strength of 3,000 personnel and is mainly equipped with patrol crafts, minesweepers and a research vessel.

== History ==
Previously, the Soviet Navy's Caspian Flotilla served in the shores of the Kazakh SSR. Following the dissolution of the Soviet Union, the fleet shrank, leaving the Kazakh contingent to serve as a basis for the newly formed navy. Kazakhstan's Naval Forces were established in April 1993 as a naval base of the Kazakh Army. The base, which was stationed in Aktau, initially became active in service on August 17, 1996, in spite of Kazakhstan being one of the largest landlocked countries on earth. In July 1999, the naval base became part of the Maritime units of the Border Guard Service of the National Security Committee of Kazakhstan. It became a separate military branch by presidential decree on 7 May 2003. In February 2010, Kazakh President Nursultan Nazarbayev, in his position as supreme commander in chief of the entire military, presented the Battle Flag to the Kazakh Navy. The 612th Airbase in Aktau was opened a year later, in 2011.

On 24 September 2026, 14 sailors drowned during combat readiness exercises dubbed Khazar Korgany-2026. 500 military personnel took part in the training.

== Structure ==
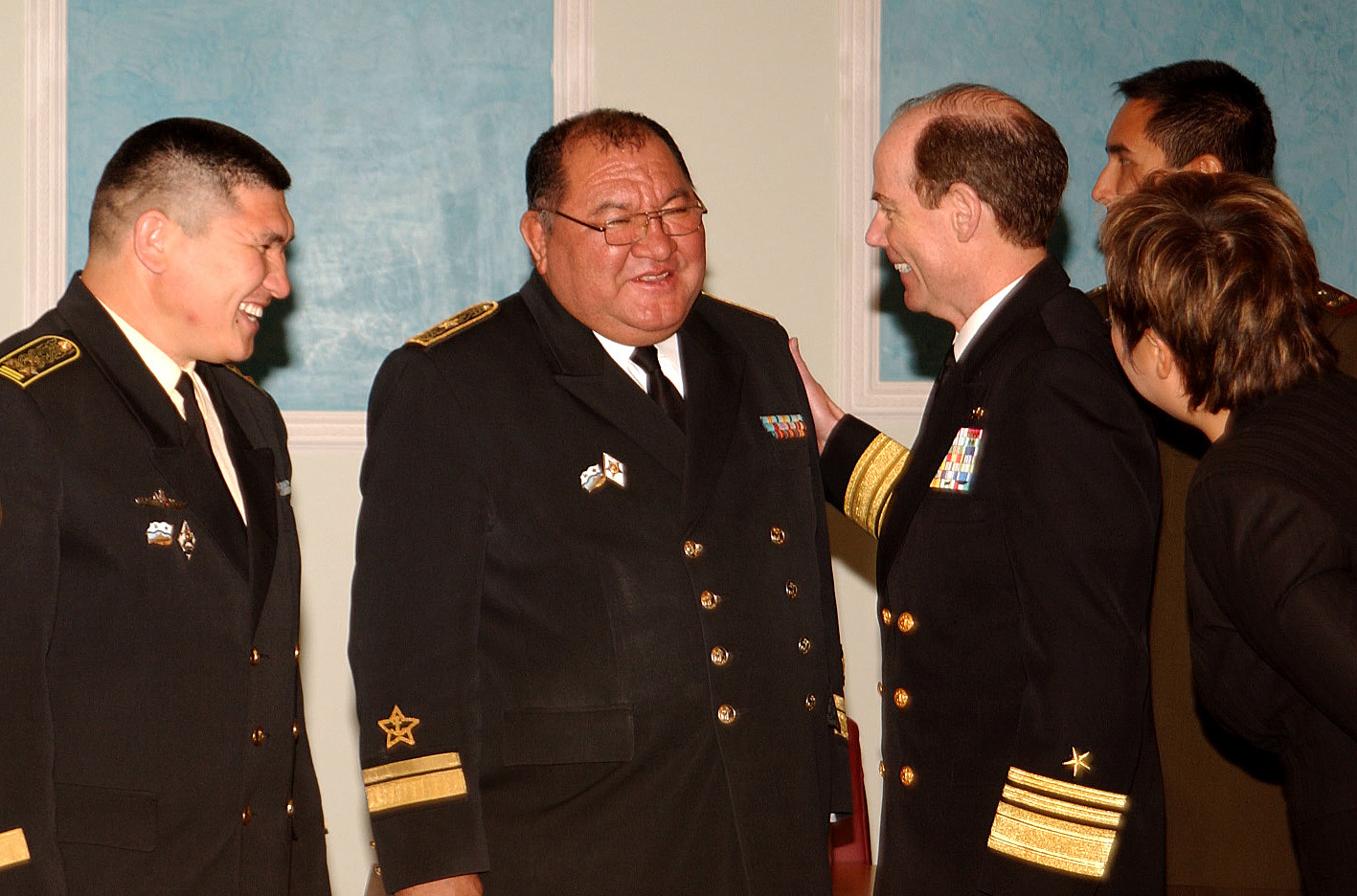
Vice Admiral Kevin Cosgriff, commander of United States Naval Forces Central Command greets Rear Admiral Ratmir Komratov prior to a meeting in the Kazakh capital of Astana.

The following units form the structure of the Kazakh Navy:

- Naval Headquarters
- Special Forces Unit
- Coastal Artillery
- Caspian Flotilla
- Border Service of the NSC
  - 1st Naval Division (Bautino)
  - 2nd Naval Division (Bautino)
  - 3rd Naval Division (Atyrau)

== Aktau Naval Academy ==
The Aktau Naval Academy of the Ministry of Defense of Kazakhstan was the main educational institution of the naval forces. It established in March 2001 by order of the national government on the basis of the Vocational Technical School No. 2. which preceded it. It was reorganized into a naval institute on July 10, 2003, effectively upgrading its status as a nationally recognized military school. Graduates of the institute have served in ships and coastal units of the Navy and maritime units of the Border Service of the National Security Committee of the Republic of Kazakhstan. In 2011, the institute was deactivated and liquidated.

== Commanders ==
- Rear Admiral Ratmir Komratov (6 November 2008 – 17 July 2009)
- Vice Admiral Zhandarbek Zhanzakov (30 September 2009 – 18 April 2018)
- Rear Admiral Saken Bekzhanov (18 April 2018 – 24 June 2024)
- Vice Admiral Serik Burambaev (24 June 2024 - 15 August 2025)
- Captain 1st rank Kanat Niyazbekov (15 August 2025 - 3 October 2026)
- Vacant (3 October 2026 - present)

== Naval equipment ==
Vessel	Origin	Type	In service	Notes
Vessel
Kazakhstan	Kazakhstan	Missile boat	4	
Mangistau	Kazakhstan / Azerbaijan	Missile boat	1	In December 2017, the flag of the Navy was raised on the ship in Aktau. The ship was commissioned into the Navy in October. In July 2018, the ship arrived in Baku to participate in the "Sea Cup - 2018" international competition.
Sea Dolphin	South Korea	Fast patrol boat	3	
Türk	Turkey	Patrol boat	2	
Archangel	United States	Patrol boat	3	
Dauntless	United States	Patrol boat	1	
Lashyn	Kazakhstan	Patrol boat	1	
OPV-62	Israel	Patrol boat	2	
Shaldag	Israel / Azerbaijan	Go-fast boat	6	Assembled in Azerbaijan
Project 10750E	Russia	Minesweeper	2	The first vessel was commissioned in 2017
Project 01340G	Russia	Research vessel	1	The ship is known to be a hydrographic ship. The vessel's name is Zhaiyk
Aircraft
Sukhoi Su-27	Russia	Fighter jets	2	
Mil Mi-24	Russia	Attack helicopters	12	

== Ranks and insignia ==
=== Commissioned officer ranks ===
The rank insignia of commissioned officers.

Rank group	General / flag officers				Senior officers			Junior officers
Kazakh Naval Forces
Kazakh Naval Forces	Жоғарғы Бас қолбасшының Joğarğı Bas qolbasşınıñ	Адмирал; Admïral	Вице-адмирал; Vice-admïral	Контр-адмирал; Kontr-admïral	Бірінші дәрежелі капитан Birinşi därejeli kapïtan	Екінші дәрежелі капитан Ekinşi därejeli kapïtan	Үшінші дәрежелі капитан Üşinşi därejeli kapïtan	Капитан-лейтенант; Kapïtan-leytenant	Аға лейтенант Ağa leytenant	Лейтенант; Leytenant

=== Other ranks ===
The rank insignia of non-commissioned officers and enlisted personnel.

Rank group	Senior NCOs								Junior NCOs	Enlisted
Kazakh Naval Forces
Kazakh Naval Forces	Шебер-старшина; Şeber-starşïna	Штаб-старшина; Ştab-starşïna	Бірінші сыныпты старшина Birinşi sınıptı starşïna	Eкінші сыныпты старшина Ekinşi sınıptı starşïna	Үшінші сыныпты старшина Üşinşi sınıptı starşïna	Бас старшина Bas starshyna	Бірінші сатылы старшина Birinşi satılı starşïna	Екінші сатылы старшина Ekinşi satılı starşïna	Аға матрос Ağa matros	Матрос; Matros
