= Polkovnik =

Military rank

Countries which use the Eastern European variant

A polkovnik (Polish: pułkownik; Bulgarian, Macedonian, Russian and Ukrainian: полковник, lit. 'regimentary') is a military rank used mostly in Slavic-speaking countries which corresponds to a colonel in English-speaking states, coronel in Spanish and Portuguese-speaking states and oberst in several German-speaking and Scandinavian countries. It was originally a rank in the Polish–Lithuanian Commonwealth and the Russian Empire. However, in Cossack Hetmanate and Sloboda Ukraine, polkovnyk was an administrative rank similar to a governor. Usually this word is translated as colonel, however the transliteration is also in common usage, for the sake of the historical and social context. Polkovnik began as a commander of a distinct group of troops (polk), arranged for battle.

The exact name of this rank maintains a variety of spellings in different languages, but all descend from the Old Slavonic word polk (from Old East Slavic: пълъкъ, lit. 'regiment sized unit'), and include the following in alphabetical order:

1. Belarus — палкоўнік
2. Bosnia and Herzegovina, Croatia, Montenegro and Serbia — pukovnik (Serbo-Croatian pronunciation: [pǔkoːʋniːk])
3. Bulgaria, North Macedonia, Russia and Ukraine — полковник (Russian pronunciation: [pɐlˈkovnʲɪk], Ukrainian pronunciation: [polˈkɔu̯nɪk])
4. Czech Republic and Slovakia — plukovník
5. Poland — pułkownik [puwˈkɔvɲik]
6. Slovenia — polkovnik

It is also used in some non-Slavic languages:

1. Azerbaijan — polkovnik
2. Georgia — პოლკოვნიკი [pʼolkʼovnikʼi]
3. Latvia — pulkvedis
4. Lithuania — pulkininkas

Lithuania (and likely Latvia) inherited the term from the Polish–Lithuanian Commonwealth. The rank of polkovnik was also used in the Estonian army until 1924. Azerbaijan and Georgia inherited it from the Russian Empire.

== Countries ==
=== Russia ===
Colonel Полко́вник (Polkovnik)
- Army and air force insignia
- Country: Russian Empire (17th century); USSR (1935–1991); Russia
- Service branch: Russian Ground Forces; Russian Air Force
- Rank: Stab-ofizer
- Formation: 17th century
- Next higher rank: Generál-mayór
- Next lower rank: Podpolkovnik
- Equivalent ranks: Kapitan 1st rank (Navy)

In the 17th century, polkovnik became the position of a regimental commander of the streltsy; this position also made it into New Regiments of the streltsy and later into the new army of Peter the Great. The rank was legalized by Table of Ranks that placed it in the 6th grade as the second-top field officer, right under the brigadier. A promotion to the rank of polkovnik gave a privilege of hereditary nobility.

The Red Army reintroduced the polkovnik rank in 1935, together with a number of other former Russian ranks, and it continued to be in used in many ex-USSR countries, including Russia.

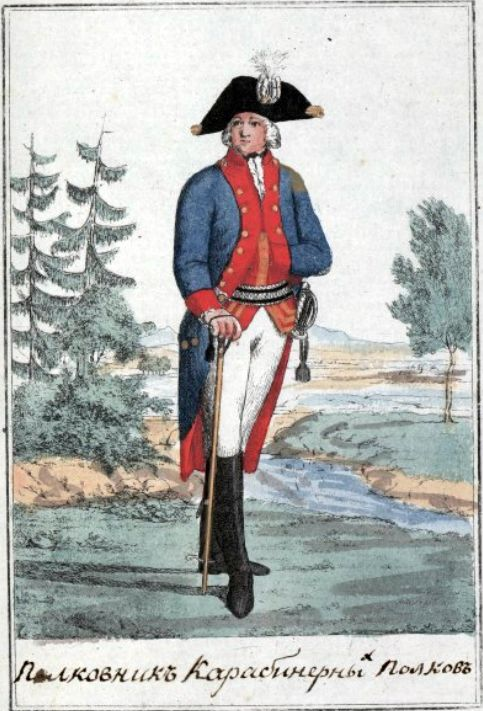
Polkovnik of the Russian Empire (1793)

==== Rank insignia ====
The Rank insignia to Polkovnik (OF-5) is as follows:

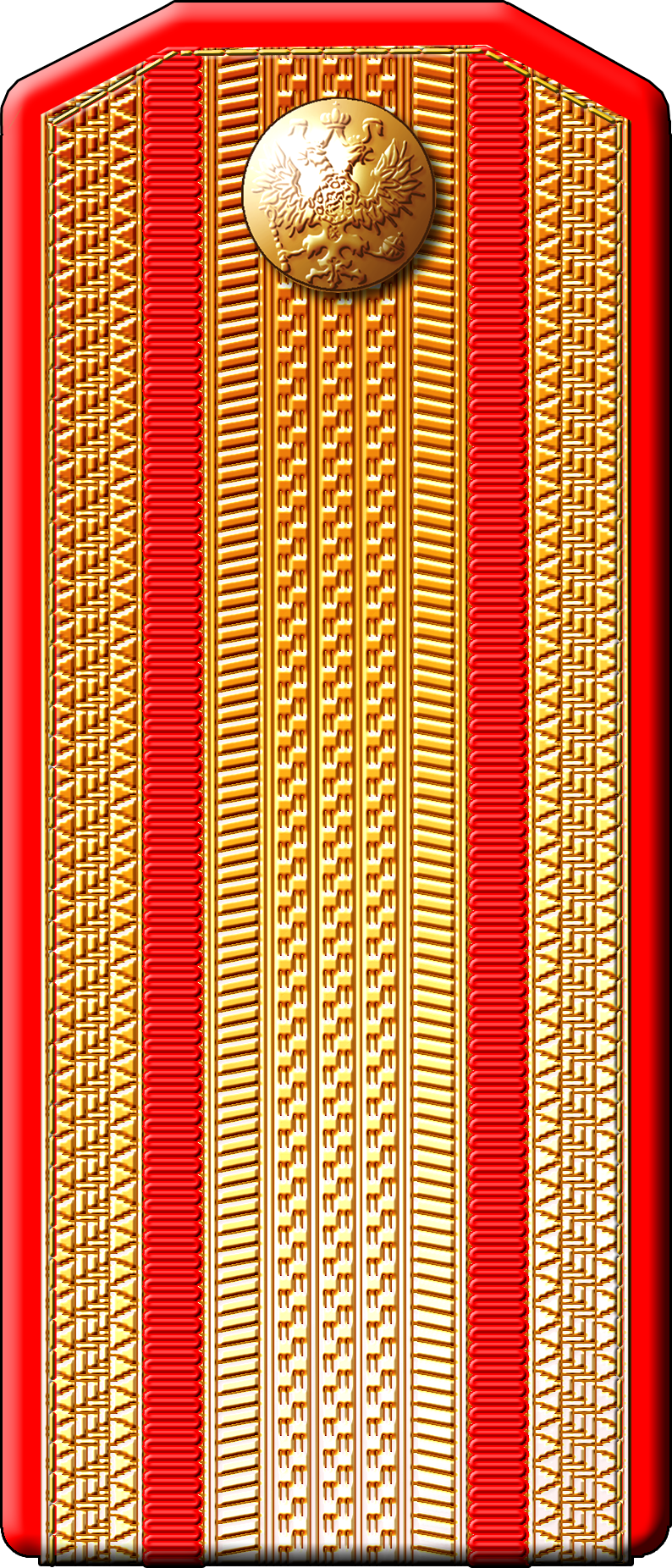
Shoulder board Pokovnik IRA until 1917

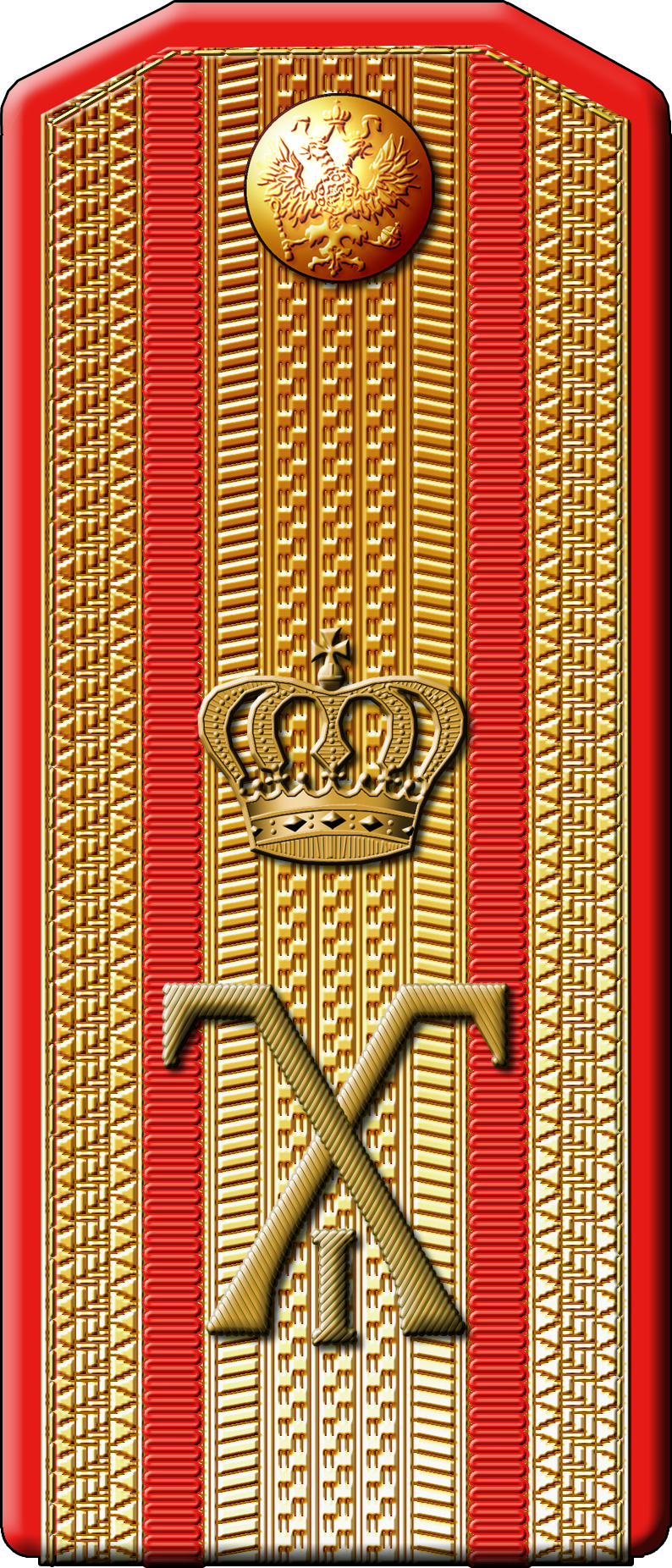
Nevsky 1st Infantry Regiment

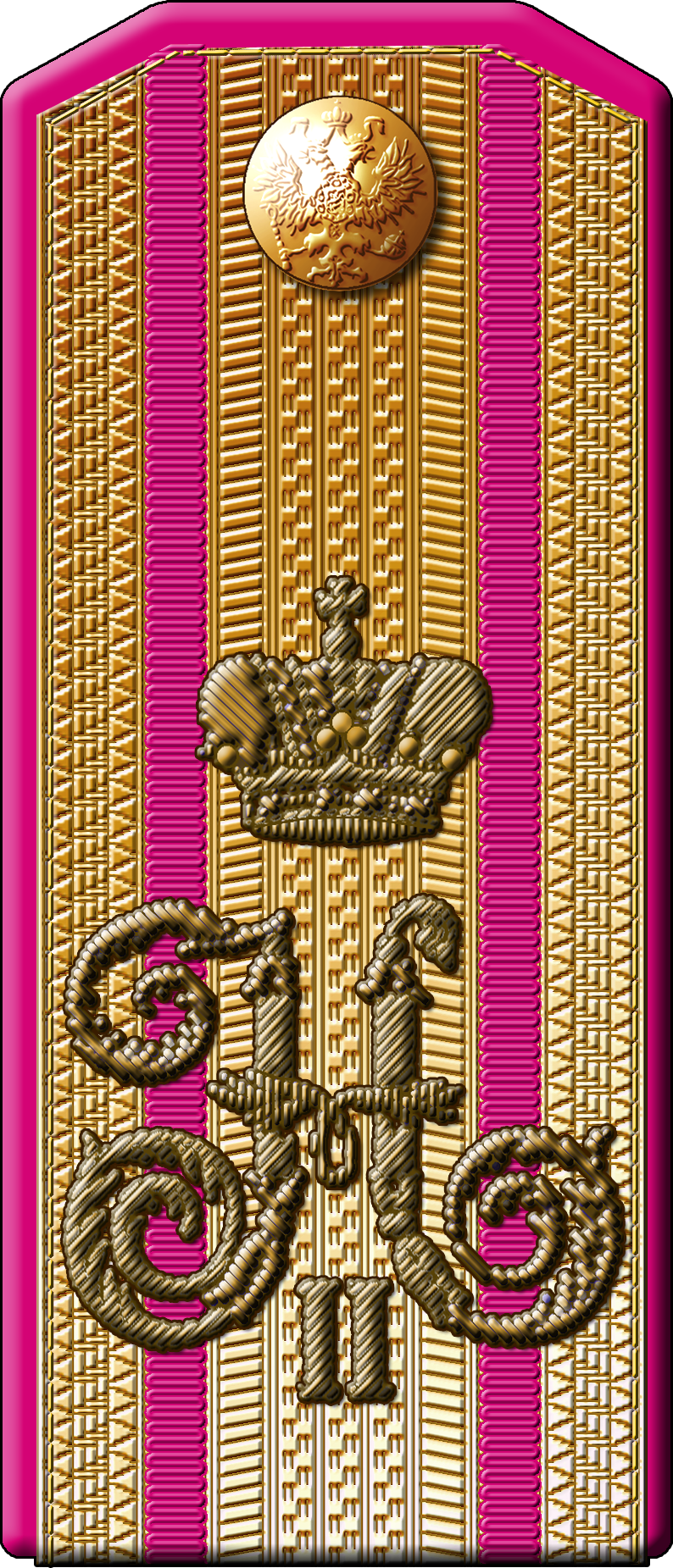
Siberian 1st of His Highness Infantry Regiment

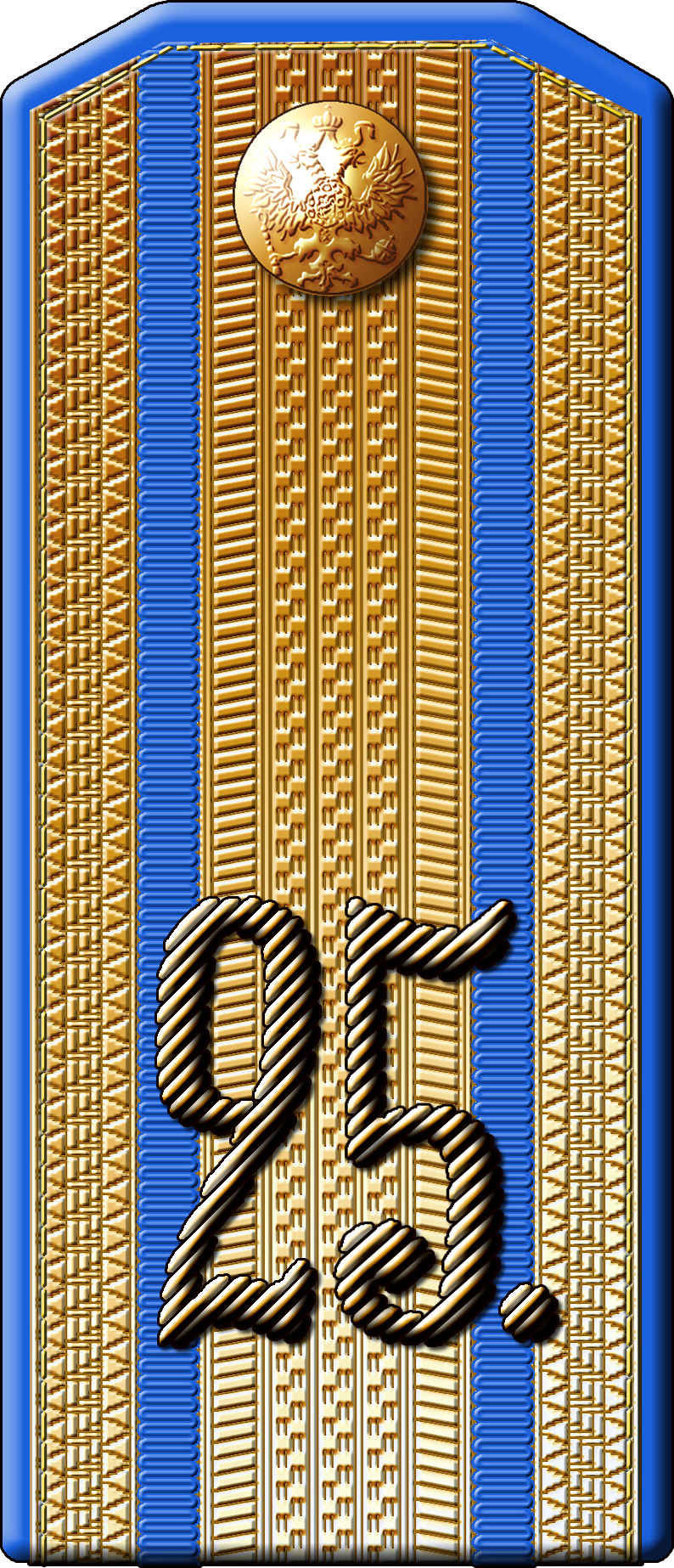
25th Infantry division

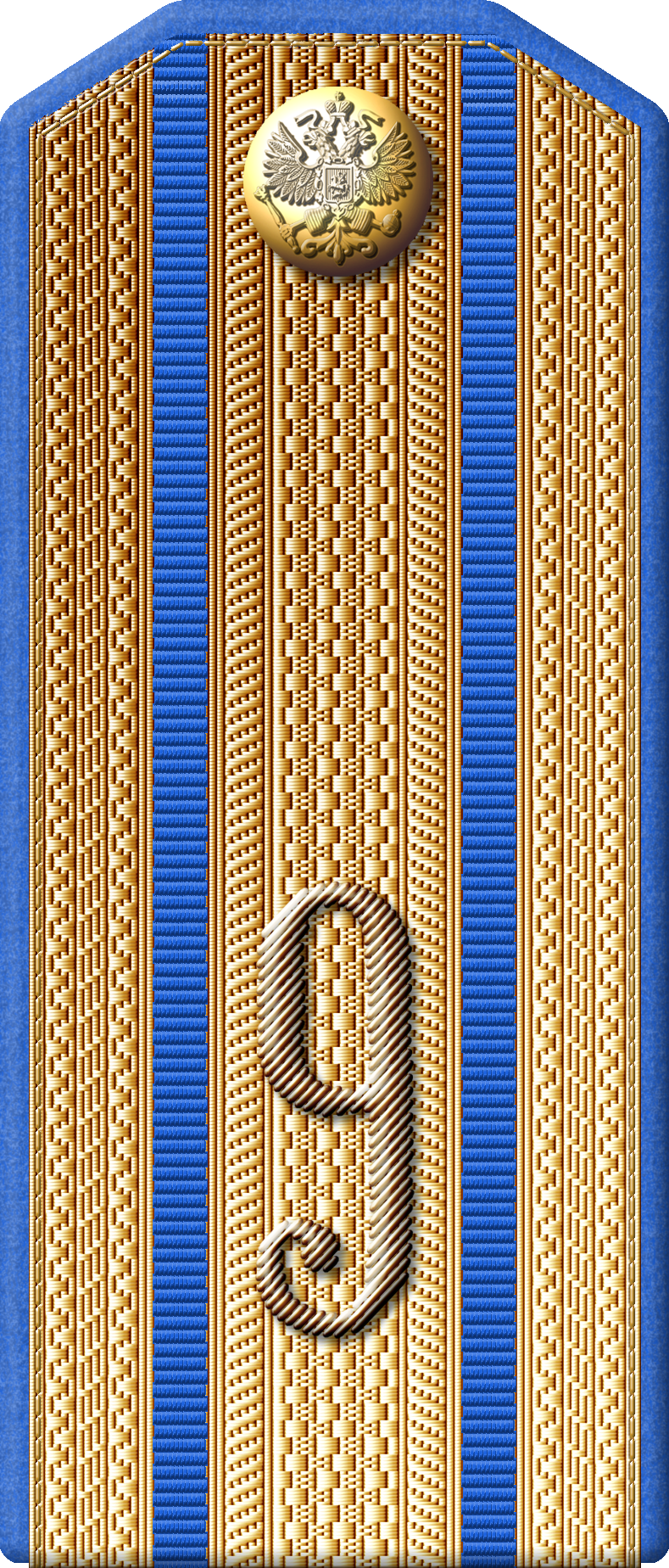
Ivanogorodsky 99th infantry regiment

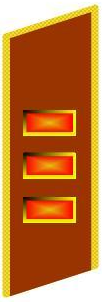
Gorget patch RA, Land forces (1935-1940)

... Air Force (1935-1940)

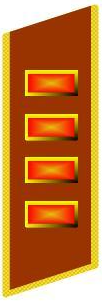
land forces RA (1940-1943)

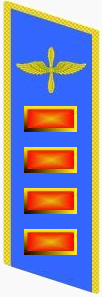
Air Force (1940-1943)

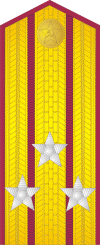
Shoulder board RA infantry/ motorized infantry (1943-1946)/ CA (1946-55)

parade uniform, Land forces (1955-1994), and since 2010

... ABF, AF, Aviation of the ADF (1955-1994), and since 2010

everyday uniform, Ground forces until 2010

..., ABF until 2010

..., AF until 2010

field uniform until 2010

parade uniform shirt, Ground forces until 2010

everyday uniform Naval forces on land until 2010

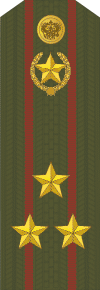
everyday uniform jacket Internal Troops

everyday uniform jacket, Ground forces since 2010

field uniform since 2010

everyday uniform jacket (Naval Aviation) since 2010

Polkovnik of the Police (until 2011 — Militsiya), also National Guard

===== See also =====
- Ranks and insignia of the Russian armed forces until 1917
- Ranks and insignia of the Red Army 1935–1940, and ... 1940–1943
- Ranks and insignia of the Soviet Army 1943–1955, and ... 1955–1991
- Ranks and insignia of the Russian Federation's armed forces 1994–2010

=== Poland ===
==== As part of the Commonwealth ====
The rank was first introduced in the armies of the Commonwealth in the 17th century to denote a captain (rotmistrz) of the core banner of a regiment. By the end of the 17th century, the title of the assignment became a de facto rank as such and started to denote the commanding officer of the entire regiment. In mercenary troops fighting in the ranks of the Polish–Lithuanian Commonwealth's army, the direct equivalent of the rank of pułkownik was oberszter, but in the 18th century the rank was abolished and renamed as pułkownik as well.

==== Interwar ====
During the Sanation in the period between World War I and World War II, a large number of officers were promoted to the rank, often for political reasons (the rule of the Sanation was even dubbed the government of the colonels because of that).

==== World War II ====
During the Invasion of Poland in 1939, the Polish divisions were commanded by officers of many grades, from colonels to three-star generals. In fact 22 divisions out of 42 were commanded by colonels in 1939. The pułkownicy (plural of pułkownik) also commanded units of all sizes, from divisions down to mere battalions.

=== Ukraine ===
In the Zaporozhian Host, the political, social, and military organization of Ukrainian cossacks, the title polkovnyk indicated a high military rank among the Ukrainian Cossack starshyna (officers); a polkovnyk commanded one or more military detachments during land and naval military actions in the 16th to 18th centuries. In the 18th century, a polkovnyk was a leader of a palanka, a territorial unit of the Zaporozhian Host. The military council elected a palanka polkovnyk to serve for a term of one year. He represented the Kosh Otaman in the palanka and had significant powers, including the right to condemn Cossacks to the death penalty. At the time of liquidation of the Zaporozhian Host by the Russian government in 1775, there were eight palanka polkovnyks. As symbol of office a polkovnyk wore a pernach (a mace with a hexagonal head; see also bulava) in his belt.

In the Registered Cossack Army of the Polish–Lithuanian Commonwealth in the 16th and 17th centuries, a polkovnyk commanded a regiment (полк, polk), a Cossack military unit. After the reform of the Cossack army by hetman Mykhailo Doroshenko in the 1620s there were six Cossack regiments, each comprising one thousand Cossacks. Polkovnyks were elected by the Cossack Council (рада, rada) subject to the approval of the Polish government. A polkovnyk obtained a salary for his service, and enjoyed considerable privileges. After the Sejm of the Polish–Lithuanian Commonwealth adopted the "Ordination" of 1638, only noblemen (szlachta) were allowed to become polkovnyks.

During Khmelnytsky Uprising (1648–1657) and in the Cossack Hetmanate (1649–1764; also in the Slobozhanshchyna in 1652–1765), a polkovnyk headed a territorial administrative unit, the regiment (полк). In terms of Nobility, Khmelnytsky's Polkovnyks were recognized as equal to Lithuania's Barons.

== Colonel (Eastern Europe)'s insignia ==
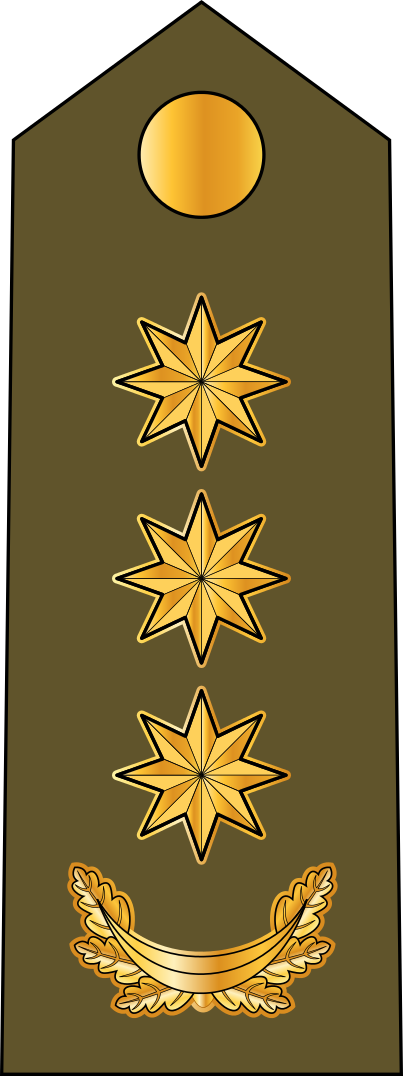
Polkovnik
(Azerbaijani Land Forces)

Палкоўнік
Palkoŭnik
(Belarusian Ground Forces)

Pukovnik
(Bosnian Ground Forces)

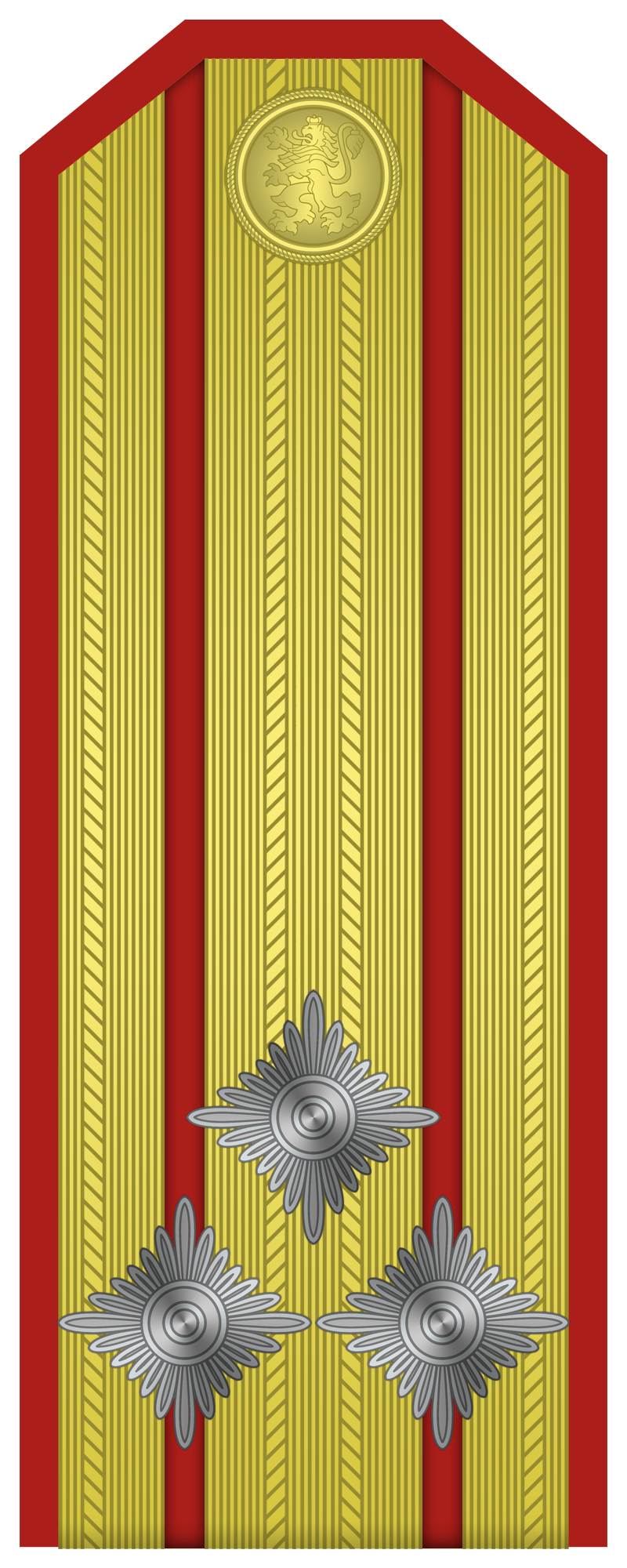
Полковник
Polkovnik
(Bulgarian Land Forces)

Pukovnik
(Croatian Army)

Plukovník
(Czech Land Forces)

პოლკოვნიკი
P’olk’ovnik’i
(Georgian Land Forces)

Полковник
Polkovnïk
(Kazakh Ground Forces)

Полковник
Polkovnik
(Kyrgyz Army)

Pulkvedis
(Latvian Land Forces)

Pulkininkas'
(Lithuanian Land Forces)

Полковник
Polkovnik
(North Macedonian Ground Forces)

Pukovnik
(Montenegrin Ground Army)

Pułkownik
(Polish Land Forces)

Полко́вник
Polkóvnik
(Russian Ground Forces)

Пуковник
Pukovnik
(Serbian Army)

Plukovník
(Slovak Ground Forces)

Polkovnik
(Slovenian Ground Force)

Полковник
Polkovnik
(Tajik National Army)

Polkownik
(Turkmen Ground Forces)

Полковник
Polkovnyk
(Ukrainian Ground Forces)

Polkovnik
(Uzbek Ground Forces)

== See also ==
- Lieutenant (Eastern Europe)
- Lieutenant colonel (Eastern Europe)
- Lieutenant colonel general
- Comparative army officer ranks of Europe

== Notes and references ==
- Гайдай Л. Історія України в особах, термінах, назвах і поняттях.-Луцьк: Вежа, 2000. (in Ukrainian)
- Довідник з історії України.За ред. І.Підкови та Р.Шуста.- К.: Генеза, 1993. (in Ukrainian)
- ЗАКОН УКРАЇНИ Про військовий обов'язок і військову службу (in Ukrainian)
- Про положення про проходження військової служби відповідними категоріями військовослужбовців (in Ukrainian)
- История Советского флота (in Russian)
- Воинские звания военнослужащих России и СССР (in Russian)
- Воинские звания (in Russian)
- Звания воинские (in Russian)
- The International Encyclopedia of Uniform and Rank Insignia around the World (in English)
