= Glavny starshina of the ship =

Russian Navy's highest rank in the petty officer career group

Glavny starshina of the ship (Russian: Гла́вный корабе́льный старшина́, romanized: ˈɡlavnɨj korabel'nyy stərʂɨˈna, lit. 'Chief ship older') is a rank used by the Russian Navy and a number of former communist state. The rank is the most senior rank in the non-commissioned officer's career group. The rank is equivalent to starshina in armies and air forces. It is usually equivalent to Warrant officer or Senior chief petty officer in English speaking navies.

== Russia ==
Glavny starshina of the ship Гла́вный корабе́льный старшина́
- shoulder board and sleeve insignia
- Country: Russia
- Service branch: Russian Navy
- Rank group: Petty officer
- Formation: 18 November 1971
- Next higher rank: Michman
- Next lower rank: Glavny starshina
- Equivalent ranks: Starshina

The rank was introduced in the Soviet Navy on 18 November 1971.

In the navy of the Russian Federation there are four ranks in the petty officer´s career group, which means:

- Glavny starshina of the ship
- Glavny starshina
- Starshina 1st stage
- Starshina 2nd stage

=== Insignia change ===
Year	1971	1991	2010
Insignia

== Insignia ==
Главный корабе́льный старшина
Glavny korabelny starshina
(Russian Navy)

Головний корабельний старшина
Holovnyy korabelʹnyy starshyna
(Ukrainian Navy)

== See also ==
- Ranks and rank insignia of the Soviet Army 1955–1991,
- Ranks and rank insignia of the Russian Federation´s armed forces 1994–2010
- Army ranks and insignia of the Russian Federation
