= Uzbek River Force =

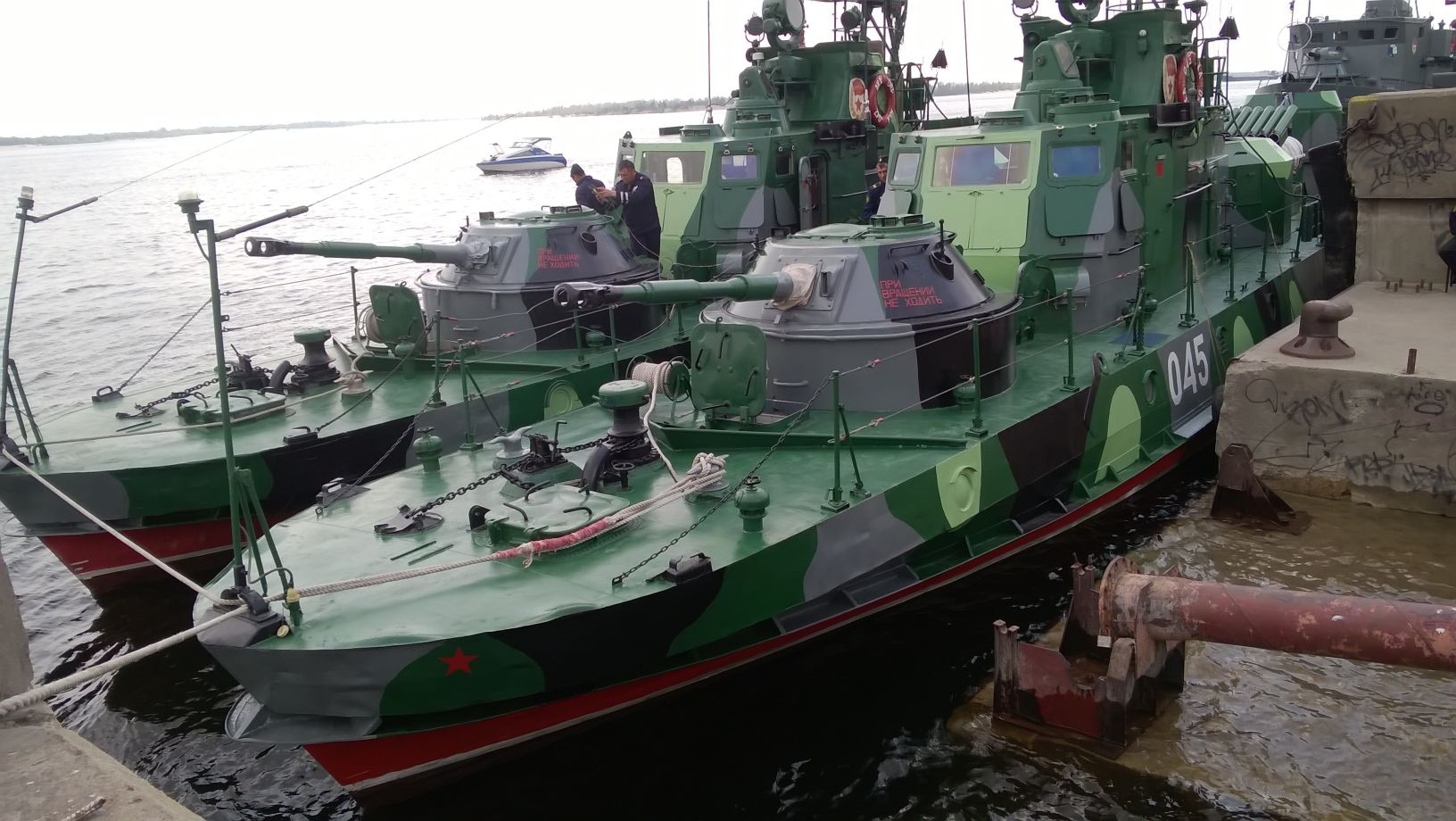
- Founded: 1992
- Country: Uzbekistan
- Branch: Border Troops of the State Security Service
- Type: Brown-water navy
- Role: Force protection Internal security Law enforcement Maritime security Naval boarding Riverine patrol
- Headquarters: Tashkent
- Colors: Black

Insignia
- Flag

The Uzbek River Force, known officially as the River Force of Uzbek Frontier Committee are the mobile riverine force of the Armed Forces of the Republic of Uzbekistan, serving under the Border Troops of the State Security Service.

== History ==
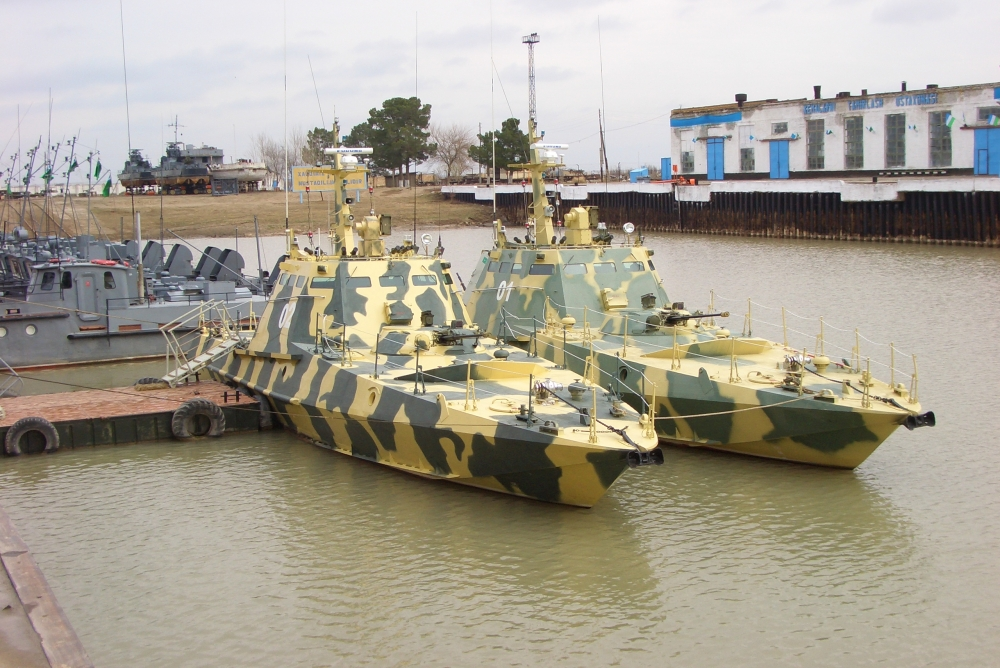
Project 58150 Gyurza class

The naval development of the continental territory of Central Asia was started by the Russians back in the 19th century. During the period of the Russian Empire, the Aral Flotilla and the Amudarya River Flotilla of the Imperial Russian Navy operated between 1852 and 1917 in Russian Turkestan. During the Russian Civil War, the Soviet Navy acquired military fleets. In the Aral Sea, a special division of ships near the Uzbek Soviet Socialist Republic functioned as part of the Caspian Flotilla. In 1943, a Russian naval base was founded in Tashkent. During the Soviet–Afghan War, it patrolled the river section from the settlement of Nizhny Panj in the Tajik SSR. After 1991, the base came under the jurisdiction of the new Uzbek republic. The new naval force was raised from the Termez Brigade of Frontier Escort Ships, which was formerly subordinated to the Central Asian Border District of the KGB Border Guard, notably protecting the Soviet-Afghan border at the Amu Darya.

== Rank ==
The navy has a system of naval ranks, which was inherited from the military ranks of the Soviet Union. Unlike the army, there is no higher officer corps in the naval ranks.

Officer ranks

| Rank group | General / flag officers | Senior officers | | | Junior officers |
|---|---|---|---|---|---|---|---|
| Uzbek River Force |
| Uzbek River Force | | I rang kapitani | II rang kapitani | III rang kapitani | Kapitan-leytenant | Katta leytenant | Leytenant |

Other ranks

| Rank group | Senior NCOs | | | | | Junior NCOs | Enlisted |
|---|---|---|---|---|---|---|---|
| Uzbek River Force |
| Uzbek River Force | Bosh starshina | I darajali starshina | II darajali starshina | III darajali starshina | Starshina | | Matros |

== Tasks ==
The boats of the river flotilla patrol the 156-kilometer border with Afghanistan along the Amu Darya. Their tasks include countering drug trafficking, smuggling, and illegal immigration. In addition, it functions as a means of preventing Islamic fundamentalism and terrorism in the region.
