= Military ranks of Ukraine =

The military ranks of the Armed Forces of Ukraine (AFU) were established in March 1992, when Ukraine adopted the Law on Military Duty and Military Service 1992.

The Ukrainian Armed Forces have two styles of ranks:

- Army ranks, which are used by the Ukrainian Ground Forces, Ukrainian Air Force, and Ukrainian Marine Corps
- Naval ranks, which are used by the Ukrainian Navy

Whilst previously Ukraine maintained a USSR-style system, its current system follows a NATO standardization.

== Current military rank insignia ==
=== Introduction of NATO-style ranks ===
On 17 October 2019, the parliament of Ukraine approved a change in the rank structure of enlisted men in order to conform to the NATO STANAG 2116 standardization. The change was implemented with the 2020 military reform. This resulted in the abolition of the rank of General of the Army of Ukraine by Law nr. 680-IX, on 1 October 2020.

Effective 23 May 2023, the Marine Corps was separated from the Navy as an independent branch of the AFU. The Corps retained the shoulder and sleeve insignia inherited from the Navy, pending the introduction of a new set of insignia designs.

=== Commissioned officer ranks ===
The following are the rank insignia of commissioned officers.

Rank group	General / flag officers				Senior officers			Junior officers
Ukrainian Ground Forces
Ukrainian Ground Forces	Генерал; Heneral	Генерал-лейтенант; Heneral-leitenant	Генерал-майор; Heneral-maior	Бригадний генерал Bryhadnyi heneral	Полковник; Polkovnyk	Підполковник; Pidpolkovnyk	Майор; Maior	Капітан; Kapitan	Старший лейтенант Starshyi leitenant	Лейтенант; Leitenant	Молодший лейтенант Molodshyi leitenant
Ukrainian Navy
Ukrainian Navy	Адмірал; Admiral	Віце-адмірал; Vitse-admiral	Контр-адмірал; Kontr-admiral	Коммодор; Kommodor	Капітан I рангу Kapitan I ranhu	Капітан II рангу Kapitan II ranhu	Капітан III рангу Kapitan III ranhu	Капітан-лейтенант; Kapitan-leytenant	Старший лейтенант Starshyy leytenant	Лейтенант; Leytenant	Молодший лейтенант Molodshyy leytenant
Ukrainian Marine Corps
Ukrainian Marine Corps	Генерал; Heneral	Генерал-лейтенант; Heneral-leitenant	Генерал-майор; Heneral-maior	Бригадний генерал Bryhadnyi heneral	Полковник; Polkovnyk	Підполковник; Pidpolkovnyk	Майор; Maior	Капітан; Kapitan	Старший лейтенант Starshyi leitenant	Лейтенант; Leitenant	Молодший лейтенант Molodshyi leitenant
Ukrainian Air Force
Ukrainian Air Force	Генерал; Heneral	Генерал-лейтенант; Heneral-leytenant	Генерал-майор; Heneral-mayor	Бригадний генерал Bryhadnyy heneral	Полковник; Polkovnyk	Підполковник; Pidpolkovnyk	Майор; Mayor	Капітан; Kapitan	Старший лейтенант Starshyy leytenant	Лейтенант; Leytenant	Молодший лейтенант Molodshyy leytenant
Special Operations Forces
Special Operations Forces	Генерал; Heneral	Генерал-лейтенант; Heneral-leitenant	Генерал-майор; Heneral-maior	Бригадний генерал Bryhadnyi heneral	Полковник; Polkovnyk	Підполковник; Pidpolkovnyk	Майор; Maior	Капітан; Kapitan	Старший лейтенант Starshyi leitenant	Лейтенант; Leitenant	Молодший лейтенант Molodshyi leitenant
Rank group	General / flag officers				Senior officers			Junior officers

==== Student officer ranks ====
Rank group	Officer Cadets					Students of military high schools (Lyceums)
Ukrainian Ground Forces
Ukrainian Ground Forces	Старший сержант Starshyi serzhant	Сержант; Serzhant	Молодший сержант Molodshyi serzhant	Старший солдат Starshyi soldat	Курсант; Kursant	Старший віце-сержант Starshyi vice-serzhant	Віце-сержант; Vice-serzhant	Молодший віце-сержант Molodshyi vice-serzhant	Ліцеїст; Litseyist
Ukrainian Navy (Note: includes Marine Corps cadets)
Ukrainian Navy	Головний старшина Holovnyy starshyna	Старшина 1-ої статті Starshyna 1-oyi statti	Старшина 2-ої статті Starshyna 2-oyi statti	Старший матрос Starshyi matros	Курсант; Kursant	Головний віце-старшина Holovnyi vice-starshyna	Віце-старшина 1 статті Vice-starshyna 1-oyi statti	Віце-старшина 2 статті Vice-starshyna 2-oyi statti	Ліцеїст; Litseyist
Ukrainian Air Force
Ukrainian Air Force	Старший сержант Starshyi serzhant	Сержант; Serzhant	Молодший сержант Molodshyi serzhant	Старший солдат Starshyi soldat	Курсант; Kursant	Старший віце-сержант Starshyi vice-serzhant	Віце-сержант; Vice-serzhant	Молодший віце-сержант Molodshyi vice-serzhant	Ліцеїст; Litseyist

=== Other ranks ===
The rank insignia of non-commissioned officers and enlisted personnel.

Rank group	Senior NCOs						Junior NCOs		Enlisted
Ukrainian Ground Forces
Ukrainian Ground Forces	Головний майстер-сержант Holovnyi maister-serzhant	Старший майстер-сержант Starshyi maister-serzhant	Майстер-сержант; Maister-serzhant	Штаб-сержант; Shtab-serzhant	Головний сержант Holovnyi serzhant	Старший сержант Starshyi serzhant	Сержант; Serzhant	Молодший сержант Molodshyi serzhant	Старший солдат Starshyi soldat	Солдат; Soldat
Ukrainian Navy
Ukrainian Navy	Головний майстер-старшина Holovnyy mayster-starshyna	Старший майстер-старшина Starshyy mayster-starshyna	Майстер-старшина; Mayster-starshyna	Штаб-старшина; Shtab-starshyna	Головний корабельний старшина Holovnyy korabelʹnyy starshyna	Головний старшина Holovnyy starshyna	Старшина 1-ої статті Starshyna 1-oyi statti	Старшина 2-ої статті Starshyna 2-oyi statti	Старший матрос Starshyy matros	Матрос; Matros
Ukrainian Marine Corps
Ukrainian Marine Corps	Головний майстер-сержант Holovnyi maister-serzhant	Старший майстер-сержант Starshyi maister-serzhant	Майстер-сержант; Maister-serzhant	Штаб-сержант; Shtab-serzhant	Головний сержант Holovnyi serzhant	Старший сержант Starshyi serzhant	Сержант; Serzhant	Молодший сержант Molodshyi serzhant	Старший солдат Starshyi soldat	Солдат; Soldat
Ukrainian Air Force
Ukrainian Air Force	Головний майстер-сержант Holovnyi maister-serzhant	Старший майстер-сержант Starshyi maister-serzhant	Майстер-сержант; Maister-serzhant	Штаб-сержант; Shtab-serzhant	Головний сержант Holovnyi serzhant	Старший сержант Starshyi serzhant	Сержант; Serzhant	Молодший сержант Molodshyi serzhant	Старший солдат Starshyi soldat	Солдат; Soldat
Special Operations Forces
Special Operations Forces	Головний майстер-сержант Holovnyi maister-serzhant	Старший майстер-сержант Starshyi maister-serzhant	Майстер-сержант; Maister-serzhant	Штаб-сержант; Shtab-serzhant	Головний сержант Holovnyi serzhant	Старший сержант Starshyi serzhant	Сержант; Serzhant	Молодший сержант Molodshyi serzhant	Старший солдат Starshyi soldat	Солдат; Soldat
Rank group	Senior NCOs						Junior NCOs		Enlisted

=== Nomenclature ===
Certain branches are suffixed with a descriptor indicating their specialty branch or if they are reservists or have retired.

Branch / status	Descriptor
Legal	X of justice
Medical	X of the medical service
Veterinary	X of the veterinary service
Reserve	X (Reserve)
Retired	X (Retired)

Formerly, air force ranks were suffixed with "of aviation". Similarly, guards unit ranks were prefixed "guards" following the rank of a serviceman of a guards unit. These descriptors have now been abolished.

== Former rank systems ==
=== 1918–1921 ===
==== Officer ranks ====
Rank group	General / flag officers					Senior officers			Junior officers
Ukrainian People's Army (1919–1920)
Ukrainian People's Army (1919–1920)		отаман Otaman					есаул Yesaul				Чотар; Chotar
Ukrainian People's Army (1920–1921)
Ukrainian People's Army (1920–1921)		Генерал-полковник; Heneral-polkovnyk	Генерал-поручник; Heneral-poruchnyk	Генерал-хорунжий; Heneral-khorunzhyi		Полковник; Polkovnyk	Підполковник; Pidpolkovnyk		Сотник; Sotnyk	Поручник; Poruchnyk	Хорунжий; Khorunzhyi	Підхорунжий; Pidkhorunzhyi
Ukrainian People's Navy (1918–1921)
Ukrainian People's Navy (1918–1921)		Адмірал; Admiral	Віце-адмірал; Vitse-admiral	Контр-адмірал; Kontr-admiral		Капітан 1-го рангу Kapitan 1-ho ranhu	Капітан 2-го рангу Kapitan 2-ho ranhu		Старший лейтенант Starshyi leitenant	Лейтенант; Leitenant	Мічман; Michman	Гардемарин; Hardemaryn
Rank group	General / flag officers					Senior officers			Junior officers
Ukrainian Galician Army (1918–1919)
Ukrainian Galician Army (1918–1919)		Генерал-сотник; Heneral-sotnyk	Генерал-поручник; Heneral-poruchnyk	Генерал-чотар; Heneral-chotar		Полковник; Polkovnyk	Підполковник; Pidpolkovnyk	Отаман; Otaman	Сотник; Sotnyk	Поручник; Poruchnyk	Чотар; Chotar	Хорунжий; Khorunzhyi	Підхорунжий; Pidkhorunzhyi
Rank group	General / flag officers					Senior officers			Junior officers
Ukrainian Soviet Army (1918–1919)
Ukrainian Soviet Army (1918–1919)	Комфронта; Komfronta	Командарм; Komandarm	Комкор; Komkor	Комдив; Komdiv	Комбриг; Kombrig	Комполка/Полковник; Kompolka/Polkovnik	Комбат; Kombat	Помкомбат; Pomkombat	Комроты; Komroty	Помкомроты; Pomkomroty		Комвзвода; Komvzvoda

==== Other ranks ====
Rank group	Senior NCOs			Junior NCOs	Enlisted
Ukrainian People's Army (1919–1920)
Ukrainian People's Army (1919–1920)		Бунчужний; Bunchuzhnyi	Чотовий; Chotovyi	Ройовий; Royovyi	Гуртковий; Hurtkovyi	Козак; Kozak
Ukrainian People's Navy (1918–1921)
Ukrainian People's Navy (1918–1921)		Кондуктор; Konduktor	Боцман; Botsman	Боцманмат; Botsmanmat	Мат; Mat	Матрос; Matros
Rank group	Senior NCOs			Junior NCOs	Enlisted
Ukrainian Galician Army (1918–1919)						No insignia
Ukrainian Galician Army (1918–1919)	Булавний десятник Bulavnyy desyatnyk	Старший десятник Starshyy desyatnyk	Десятник; Desyatnyk	Вістун; Vistun	Старший стрілець Starshyy striletsʹ	Стрілець; Striletsʹ
Rank group	Senior NCOs			Junior NCOs	Enlisted
Ukrainian Soviet Army (1918–1919)					No insignia
Ukrainian Soviet Army (1918–1919)		Старшина; Starshina	Помкомвзвода; Pomkomvzvoda	Комот; Komot	Красноармеец; Krasnoarmeets

=== 1940–1949 ===
==== Officer ranks ====
Rank group	General / flag officers			Senior officers			Junior officers
Ukrainian Insurgent Army (1942–1949)
Ukrainian Insurgent Army (1942–1949)	Генерал-полковник; Heneral-polkovnyk	Генерал-майор; Heneral-mayor	Генерал-хорунжий; Heneral-Khorunzhyi	Полковник; Polkovnyk	Підполковник; Pidpolkovnyk	Майор; Mayor	Сотник; Sotnyk	Поручник; Poruchnyk	Хорунжий; Khorunzhyi	Підхорунжий; Pidkhorunzhyi

==== Other ranks ====
Rank group	Senior NCOs		Junior NCOs		Enlisted
Ukrainian Insurgent Army (1942–1949)
Ukrainian Insurgent Army (1942–1949)	Бунчужний; Bunchuzhnyi	Чотовий; Chotovyi	Ройовий; Royovyi	Вістун; Vistun	Старший козак Starshyi kozak	Козак; Kozak

=== 1991 system ===
Ukraine inherited the ranks of the Soviet Union upon becoming independent, with some changes:

- The rank "Єфрейтор" (Yefryeitor) was changed to "senior soldier"
- The rank "private" was changed to "soldier"
- Marshal ranks and the category of praporshchyks (midshipmen) were abolished

==== Officer ranks ====
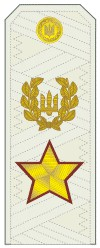
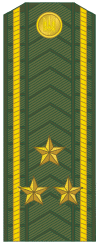
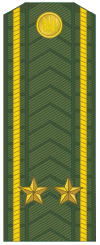
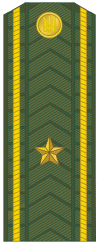
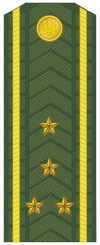
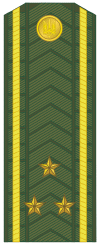
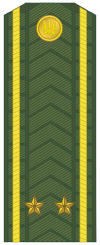
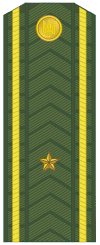
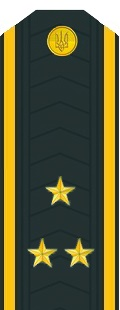
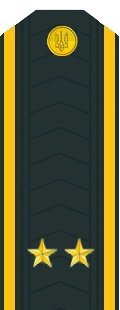
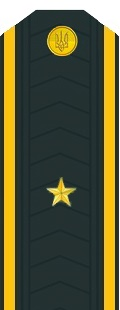
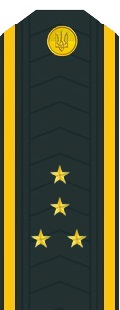
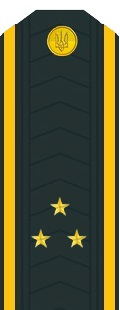
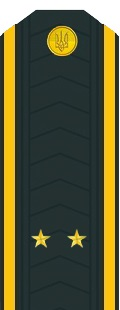
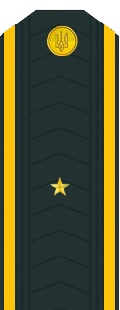
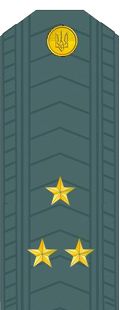
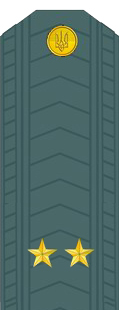
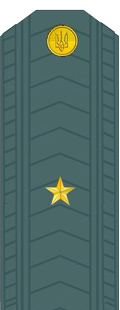
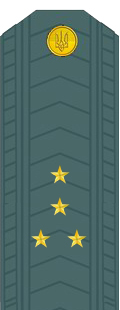
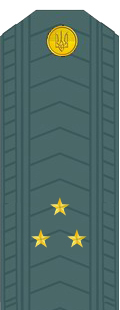
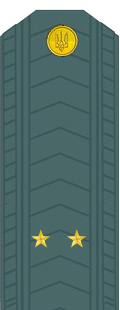
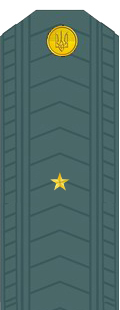
Rank group	General / flag officers				Senior officers			Junior officers
Ukrainian Ground Forces (1991–2009)
Ukrainian Ground Forces (1991–2009)	Генерал армії України; Heneral armii Ukrainy	Генерал-полковник; Heneral-polkovnyk	Генерал-лейтенант; Heneral-leytenant	Генерал-майор; Heneral-mayor	Полковник; Polkovnyk	Підполковник; Pidpolkovnyk	Майор; Mayor	Капітан; Kapitan	Старший лейтенант Starshyi leitenant	Лейтенант; Leitenant	Молодший лейтенант Molodshyi leitenant
Ukrainian Navy (1991–2009)
Ukrainian Navy (1991–2009)		Адмірал; Admiral	Віце-адмірал; Vitse-admiral	Контр-адмірал; Kontr-admiral	Капітан I рангу Kapitan I ranhu	Капітан II рангу Kapitan II ranhu	Капітан III рангу Kapitan III ranhu	Капітан-лейтенант; Kapitan-leitenant	Старший лейтенант Starshyi leitenant	Лейтенант; Leitenant	Молодший лейтенант Molodshyi leitenant
Ukrainian Air Force (1991–2009)
Ukrainian Air Force (1991–2009)		Генерал-полковник; Heneral-polkovnyk	Генерал-лейтенант; Heneral-leytenant	Генерал-майор; Heneral-mayor	Полковник; Polkovnyk	Підполковник; Pidpolkovnyk	Майор; Mayor	Капітан; Kapitan	Старший лейтенант Starshyi leitenant	Лейтенант; Leitenant	Молодший лейтенант Molodshyi leitenant
Rank group	General / flag officers				Senior officers			Junior officers

==== Enlisted ranks ====
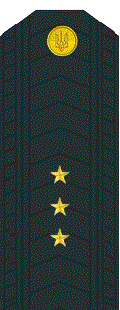
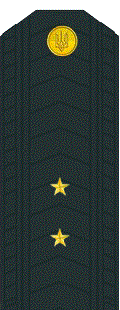
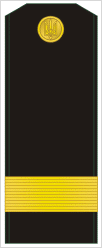
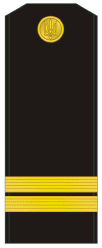
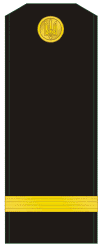
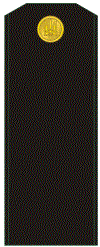
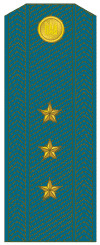
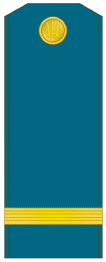
Rank group	Senior NCOs						Junior NCOs	Enlisted
Ukrainian Ground Forces (1991–2009)
Ukrainian Ground Forces (1991–2009)	Старший прапорщик Starshyi praporshchyk	Прапорщик; Praporshchyk	Старшина; Starshyna	Старший сержант Starshyi serzhant	Сержант; Serzhant	Молодший сержант Molodshyi serzhant	Старший солдат Starshyi soldat	Солдат; Soldat
Ukrainian Navy (1991–2009)
Ukrainian Navy (1991–2009)	Старший мічман Starshyi michman	Мічман; Michman	Головний корабельний старшина Holovnyi korabelnyi starshyna	Головний старшина Holovnyi starshyna	Старшина 1-ої статті Starshyna 1-oi statti	Старшина 2ої статті Starshyna 2-oi statti	Старший матрос Starshyi matros	Матрос; Matros
Ukrainian Air Force (1991–2009)
Ukrainian Air Force (1991–2009)	Старший прапорщик Starshyi praporshchyk	Прапорщик; Praporshchyk	Старшина; Starshyna	Старший сержант Starshyi serzhant	Сержант; Serzhant	Молодший сержант Molodshyi serzhant	Старший солдат Starshyi soldat	Солдат; Soldat
Rank group	Senior NCOs						Junior NCOs	Enlisted

== Proposed changes ==
=== Proposed system 2009 ===
The first graduates of the Training Centre for Sergeants of the Armed Forces of Ukraine in Kharkiv became the first professional sergeants, who wore cloth shoulder straps with a new insignia.

The new insignia of the ground forces and the Air Force of Ukraine (from general of the army to senior soldier)	The new insignia of the Ukrainian Naval Force (from admiral to junior lieutenant)

These changes were aimed to conform with NATO standards. Until 2009, Ukrainian soldiers used a military rank insignia of the Soviet model. Before the changes, a Ukrainian major general could be confused with an ordinary major, as they both had only one star on the Soviet straps. The new straps of major general have two stars, like in most NATO countries. Also, the new system of military insignia makes possible to introduce new ranks, such as brigade general or new types of sergeant. New straps of generals have crossed maces (bulawas), which are kleinods (regalia) of Hetman, colonel and Otaman of the Host.

These experimental insignia were never fully adopted and were abandoned shortly afterwards. Up until 2015 the Armed Forces kept using the Soviet-style insignia and rank system, albeit in the case of the Ground Forces and the Air Force the old insignia stayed with the officer corps while the 2009 proposal for NCO insignia saw wider adoption and thus replaced the Soviet insignia.

==== Sergeant major (the post of chief sergeant) ====
Chief sergeant of a branch of the armed forces is a projected post in Ukraine. The chief sergeant is a person who knows almost all issues that relate to non-commissioned officers. Therefore, the chief sergeant of a branch of the armed forces may be adviser to the head of the appropriate level – for example, the commander of land forces of Ukraine. The Ministry of Defence is working to change the statute and, possibly, the new post was projected to be introduced c. 2012–2013. In airmobile units (now Ukrainian Air Assault Forces) there were also posts of chief sergeant of the division and chief sergeant of the brigade.

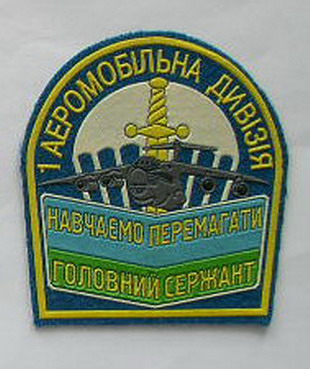
Sleeve patch for chief sergeant of the 1st Airmobile Division

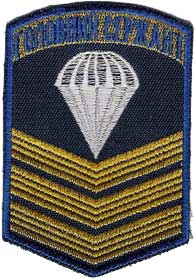
Sleeve patch for chief sergeant of the 25th Airborne Brigade (ver. 1)

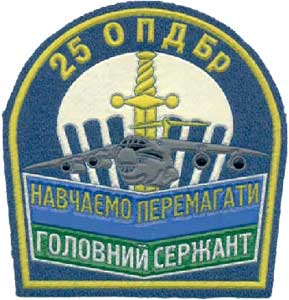
Sleeve patch for chief sergeant of the 25th Airborne Brigade (ver. 2)

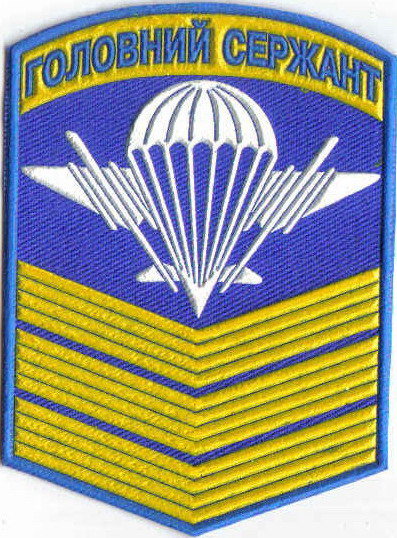
Sleeve patch for chief sergeant of the Airmobile Forces

=== 2016 system ===
In late July 2015, President Petro Poroshenko stated that Ukraine needed to introduce new military ranks that meet Ukrainian military traditions "and corresponds to the structure of NATO military ranks". However, the system then proposed replicated the Soviet hierarchy of military ranks and had no relation to the NATO system whatsoever, with only a cosmetic change to the shoulder strap insignia.

The reform of 2016 was meant to achieve NATO standardization while honoring the traditions of Cossacks in Ukraine, the Ukrainian independence armies, and the Ukrainian People's Army of the Russian Civil War, the Ukrainian War of Independence, and the Second World War-era Ukrainian Insurgent Army, adapting their rank insignias to suit a modern AFU for the current times and beyond.

Project of the new insignia of the ground forces and the Air Force of Ukraine (Old ranks system)	Project of the new insignia of the ground forces and the Air Force of Ukraine (Expanded ranks system)

While option 1 uses the old system but with new other ranks insignia, option 2 uses a US-style insignia for enlisted ranks, NCOs, and the Brigadier general rank. In both cases, all officers use pips while the General of the Army of Ukraine has the crossed Bulawa as insignia. Early proposals had the General of the Army shoulder insignia to use the state coat of arms.

Adopted new insignia of the ground forces and the Air Force of Ukraine for 2016
(Expanded ranks system)
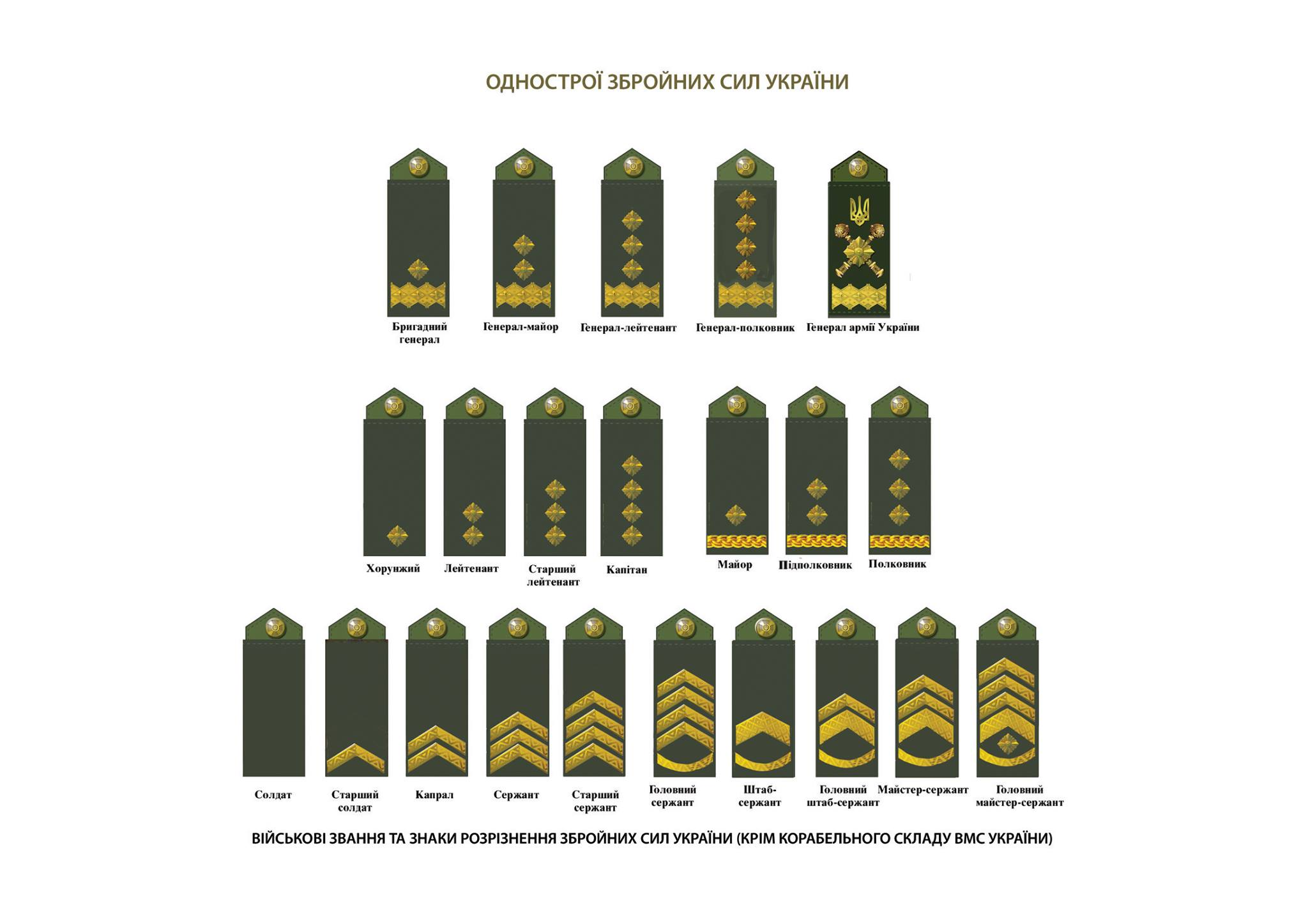

In 2016, new rank insignia designs were issued for the Navy, which included both shoulder and sleeve insignia for all ranks.

Project of the new insignia of the Navy of Ukraine (Sea ratings and other ranks of the shore establishment)	Project of the new insignia of the Navy of Ukraine (officer ranks)	Navy sleeve insignia

Uniforms using the revised system debuted on 24 August 2016, as Ukraine marked the silver jubilee of nationhood. The stars used for officers' ranking from the Soviet era were replaced with British military style diamonds – inspired by those used by the Ukrainian State of 1918.

The Navy planned to phase-in new insignia by 2017, with a unified set shoulder and sleeve rank insignia similar to many NATO and European Union naval forces with distinctions:

- Western-styled sleeve insignia used for officers of the naval branch
- Dark boards with Army-styled insignia for officers of the marine division, naval aviation and shore establishment commands

On 30 May 2019, the Verkhovna Rada (Ukrainian parliament) adopted as a basis Bill No. 10181 on the introduction of sergeant ranks in the Armed Forces of Ukraine in accordance with the column "NATO Code" in STANAG 2116. The bill aims to improve Ukraine's legislation on military service with the aim of streamlining the disciplinary powers of officials, settlement of some issues of daily activity, determination of the rights and duties of the sergeant (officers) and some other officials of the UAF.

It was proposed to introduce a new scale of military ranks. In addition, separation of the sergeant and senior officers into junior and senior ranks (and general/flag officers for the officer corps) was foreseen, as well as the introduction of a sergeant major rank to the armed forces.

It is also envisaged to change the limitation age for military service for sergeants, which eliminates the problem when a sergeant under the law can not reach retirement due to a conflict between the current legislation.

== See also ==
- Military ranks of the Soviet Union
- Ukrainian Armed Forces branch insignia
