= Aerospace Forces ranks and insignia of the Russian Federation =

The following table presents images of the rank insignia used by the Russian Aerospace Forces. The Russia inherited the ranks of the Soviet Union, although the insignia and uniform were altered a little, especially the re-introduction of the old Tsarist crown and double eagle. The Russian Aerospace Forces follow the same rank structure as the Russian Ground Forces, with the addition of the title "of aviation" to each officer's rank, now abandoned.

Russian armed forces have two styles of ranks: troop ranks (army-style ranks) and deck ranks (navy-style ranks). The army uses troop ranks, and so does the Air Force. The following table of Ranks is based on those of the Russian Federation. The Russian Federation eliminated the descriptor "of Aviation" following ranks; however, common use of this is being abolished altogether. The rank of a serviceman of a "Guards" unit or formation may be followed by the word Guards. The rank of a citizen of the legal, medical, or veterinary professions shall be followed by the words of Justice, of the medical service, or of the Veterinary service, to their respective ranks. The rank of a citizen having reserve or retired status shall be followed by the word Reserve or Retired, respectively.

== Table of ranks ==
The rank insignia shown here are in the current duty uniforms; the new parade dress uniform epaulets is Air Force blue for NCOs and airmen and gold and blue for the officer corps while the current everyday dress uniforms retain the old design save for NCOs and airmen epaulet insignia.

Rank group	General/Flag/Air officers				Senior officers			Junior officers
Russian Aerospace Forces
Russian Aerospace Forces	Генера́л а́рмии Generál ármii	Генера́л-полко́вник; Generál-polkóvnik	Генера́л-лейтена́нт; Generál-leytenánt	Генера́л-майо́р; Generál-mayór	Полко́вник; Polkóvnik	Подполко́вник; Podpolkóvnik	Майо́р; Majór	Kапита́н; Kapitán	Старший лейтена́нт Stárshiy leytenánt	Лейтенант; Leytenant	Mла́дший лейтена́нт Mládshiy leytenánt

Rank group	Senior NCOs						Junior NCOs	Enlisted
Russian Aerospace Forces
Russian Aerospace Forces	Ста́рший пра́порщик Stárshiy práporshchik	Пра́порщик; Práporshchyk	Старшина́ Starshyná	Ста́рший сержа́нт Stárshiy serzhánt	Сержа́нт; Serzhánt	Мла́дший сержа́нт Mládshiy serzhánt	Ефре́йтор; Efréĭtor	Рядово́й; Ryadovóy

== See also ==
- Comparative military ranks
- Ranks and insignia of space forces
- Russian military ranks
- Ranks and insignia of the Soviet military
