= Oleksandr Marchenko =

Oleksandr or Aleksandr Marchenko may refer to:

- Oleksandr Marchenko (rower)
- Oleksandr Marchenko (politician)
- Aleksandr Marchenko (footballer) (born 1996), Russian footballer
