= Interregional Academy of Personnel Management =

Private university in Kyiv, Ukraine

Interregional Academy of Personnel Management (Ukrainian: Міжрегіональна Академія управління персоналом, romanized: Mizhrehionalna Akademiia upravlinnia personalom; shortened as МАУП in Ukrainian and IAPM in English) is the first private higher education institution in Ukraine. Founded in 1989 as a non-state establishment, IAPM consists of a preparatory department, a lyceum, a college, institutes, and a postgraduate school and has over 50,000 students in many branches throughout the country. Since 1991, IAPM has published the Personnel magazine and the Personnel Plus newspaper.

== History ==
Interregional Academy of Personnel Management was established by Georgy Shchokin in 1989 as a non-governmental higher education and research institution focused on management and business issues. First rector and president was Shchokin himself, who currently holds the president position.

== Formal structure ==
Due to IAPM being a joint stock company it has an unorthodox formal structure for a higher education facility in Ukraine. Although rector is an important figure and indeed Georgy Shchokin himself was one up until 1996, Supervisory Board and Presidium are superior in terms of organizations and critical decisions.

=== Presidium ===
- President: Rostyslav Shchokin (since February 2020).
- Vice Presidents: Mykhailo Honcharenko, Serhii Khrapatyi, Kateryna Shevts.
- Rector, currently Kyrylo Muraviov.
- General director of European Professional Doctorate: Anatolii Podoliaka.
- Head of the Branch of High School of International Security in Łódź: Iryna Klymkova.

=== Rectors ===
- Georgy Shchokin (1990–1996) (currently Chairman of the supervisory board)
- Volodymyr Yarovoy (1996–1998)
- Valerii Bebyk (1996–2003)
- Mykola Holovatyii (2003–2008)
- Valerii Zakhozhaii (2008–2010)
- Anatolii Podoliaka (2010–2015)
- Mykola Kurko (2015–2020)
- Mykhailo Honcharenko (2020–2024) (currently Vice President)
- Kyrylo Muraviov (2024–present)

== Publications ==
The MAUP has published more than 300 study plans and manuals and 200 books for educational programs. The Personnel magazine is registered by The Presidium of the State Accreditation Committee as a supplement to economics, law, psychology, pedagogy, philosophy, and social and political sciences. MAUP's editions have been recommended for use by The Ministry of Education of Ukraine.

The MAUP asserts that "Under the results of Sophiya Kyivska, the Rating of Higher Education Establishments in Ukraine (2000), and International Open Popularity and Quality Rating (1998–2000) IRAPM was recognized as the best non-state higher education establishment in Ukraine."

== Controversies ==
=== Allegations of antisemitism ===
In early and mid-2000s, the MAUP became embroiled in controversies because of evident antisemitism in their publications and conferences. The MAUP maintains that their activities can be classified only as anti-Zionism, but the Anti-Defamation League (ADL) has referred to traditional antisemitic propaganda traits that have no connection to Zionism, such as religious antisemitism or solely blaming the Jews for the Russian October Revolution or the Holodomor of 1932–1933 (as a part of the Judeo-Bolshevist antisemitic conspiracy theory).

During 6 October 2004 hearing of the Annual Report on International Religious Freedom 2004 and Designations of Countries of Particular Concern before the Committee on International Relations of the United States Congress, the MAUP was called "[t]he most troubling development" in Ukraine and it was asserted that it receives "significant funding from Arab and Muslim states".

On 14–19 April 2005 the MAUP weekly newspaper Personnel Plus published an open letter to President Yushchenko, Ukrainian Verkhovna Rada Speaker Volodymyr Lytvyn and Supreme Court of Ukraine Chief Justice Malyarenko calling for a parliamentary investigation into the "criminal activities of organized Jewry in Ukraine". The newspaper claimed that the letter was signed by more than a hundred scientific, civic, and political leaders.

After the Iranian President Mahmoud Ahmadinejad's widespread misquote, "wipe Israel off the map" (when his real quote was "Israel is an unnatural creature, it will not survive") had evoked international condemnations, on 4 November 2005 the MAUP issued "a decisive protest against large-scale campaign, organized by Zionists, against the Islamic Republic of Iran and its President Mahmoud Ahmadinejad […] where he quoted the words of the Iranian spiritual leader Ayatollah Khomeini about future death of Israel and the USA".

In his 22 November statement, Georgy Shchokin, the MAUP's president who also heads the "International Personnel Academy" (IPA) and the Ukrainian Conservative Party (UCP), combined traditional Christian antisemitism with what has been defined as "new antisemitism", and failed to mention that the UN General Assembly Resolution 3379 of 1975 (equating Zionism and racism) has been revoked in 1991 by the UNGA Resolution 4686:

"We'd like to remind that the Living God Jesus Christ said to Jews two thousand years ago: 'Your father is a devil!' … Zionism in 1975 was acknowledged by General Assembly of UN as the form of racism and race discrimination, that, in the opinion of the absolute majority of modern Europeans, makes the most threat to modern civilization. Israel is the artificially created state (classic totalitarian type). ... Their end is known, and only the God's true will rescue all of us. We are not afraid, as God always together with his children!"

On 1 December 2005, the MAUP held a conference "The Jewish-Bolshevik Revolution of 1917 – the Source of the Red Terrorism and the Starvation of Ukraine".

In the March 2006 issue of the Personnel Plus, an article revived false blood libel accusations from the infamous 1911 Beilis Trial by mischaracterizing the verdict as the jury recognizing the case as ritual murder by persons unknown even though it found Beilis himself not guilty, when in fact the defense had entirely rested on demolishing the concept of Jewish ritual murder. A week earlier, MAUP leaders had visited the grave of Andrei Yuschinsky, the Christian boy who had been the victim in the case.

At a conference held at the MAUP Academy in Kyiv, the heads of the MAUP accused "Rothschild's Soldiers" of the genocide of the Ukrainian people.

On 15 August 2006, an article on the MAUP's website denounced the Bnai Brith as "the Jewish Gestapo".

==== Reactions ====
On 21 November 2005, the Simon Wiesenthal Center issued a public statement to Ukraine's government, requesting they denounce and revoke MAUP's accreditation.

On 5 December the President of the Ukrainian American Coordinating Council (UACC) Ihor Gawdiak issued a statement "to convey our profound shock and distress concerning the horrific statement made on 4 November by the heads of the International Academy of Manpower Management (MAUP) in support of the Iranian President's statement that Israel should be wiped off the map."

On the same day, the office of the President of Ukraine Viktor Yushchenko issued a statement which said in part:

"The Head of State is worried that anti-Semitism spreads throughout Ukraine. He condemned the Interregional Academy of Personnel Management (IAPM) as an institution that systematically publishes anti-Semitic articles in its publication Personnel. Yushchenko said he had left the supervisory council of the journal to protest against this inhumane policy. He called on professors of the IAPM to respect citizens of all nationalities and confessions and to "stop rousing national hatred."

Yushchenko once sat on MAUP's board, and Foreign Minister of Ukraine Borys Tarasyuk was honorary director of one of MAUP's subdivisions until 2005. Yushchenko resigned from MAUP several years ago, following its criticism by Jewish organizations.

On 6 December, the ADL urged the US House of Representatives to delay approval of Ukraine's graduation from the Jackson-Vanik amendment. The ADL National Director Abraham Foxman wrote: "We expect more from democratic states than we do from totalitarian ones. This year alone has seen a steep increase in acts of violence and vandalism against Jews across Ukraine. There have been attempts to ban everything from Jewish organizations to Jewish holy texts. The university MAUP [...] actively promotes anti-Semitism of the most vicious kind."

On 7 December, the US-Ukraine Foundation (USUF) condemned "[...] the November 4, 2005 statements by the Interregional Academy of Personnel Management (MAUP) as hateful, virulent and having no place in the public discourse in Ukraine or anywhere else. MAUP's anti-Semitic statements supporting the Iranian President's recent call for Israel to be 'wiped off the map' was an affront to decency that provoked the unequivocal international condemnation it deserved."

Speaking on national television on 23 January 2006, Foreign Minister of Ukraine Borys Tarasyuk "strongly condemned the anti-Semitic actions of MAUP University" and confirmed that "having exhausted all efforts to convince MAUP leaders to drop their unlawful and wrongful actions" he broke off contacts with University a year ago. In its press release, the Ministry of Education and Science of Ukraine accused MAUP of breaking Ukrainian law, noting "persistent incompliance with requirements of state licensing rules for universities, failure to abide with legally binding decisions of the State Accreditation Commission", qualifying it as "a general negligence of law and a desire to pursue activities inconsistent with the status of Higher Education Institute in Ukraine".

This move was welcomed by the UACC, National Coalition Supporting Soviet Jewry, the ADL, and other human rights advocates.

The leader of Vaad in Ukraine Joseph Zissels called MAUP "the most influential center of anti-Semitism in the country."

The latest rebuke came from Ukraine's High Court which ruled against MAUP as it sought to sue the Jewish Confederation of Ukraine for publishing articles "about MAUP activities directed against the Jewish community and Zionism".

In 2008, the U.S. State Department published its "Contemporary Global Anti-Semitism: A Report Provided to the United States Congress" and singled out MAUP when it stated the organization "is one of the most persistent anti-Semitic institutions in Eastern Europe."

==== David Duke ====
On June 3, 2005, IAPM sponsored a one-day conference entitled "Zionism As the Biggest Threat to Modern Civilization" attended by the former Knights of the Ku Klux Klan Grand Wizard David Duke of the United States. The Kyiv Post newspaper called the gathering "a disgusting orgy of racism and hatred". In August 2005, the MAUP awarded Duke with a Candidate of Sciences degree in history.

In September 2005 IAPM gave Duke a PhD in history. His doctoral thesis was titled "Zionism as a Form of Ethnic Supremacism". The ADL has said that MAUP is the main source of antisemitic activity and publishing in Ukraine, and its "anti-Semitic actions" were condemned by Foreign Minister Borys Tarasyuk and various organizations. Duke has taught an international relations course and a history course at MAUP. On June 3, 2005, he co-chaired a conference named "Zionism As the Biggest Threat to Modern Civilization" sponsored by MAUP and attended by several Ukrainian public figures and politicians and Israel Shamir, described by the ADL as an antisemitic writer.

=== Allegations of anti-Ukrainian sentiment by Viktor Kolpakov ===
"I'm a soldier, I'm a colonel, and I'm ordering you to leave!", but I told him that I was not going anywhere because I did not insult him in any way and I was not interrupting the lecture and I'm paying a lot of money to be here. Meanwhile the professor was demaning from the guys "Get this rude girl out of here by force!"

In 2019, a female student accused one of the professors Viktor Kolpakov of openly promoting pro-Russian and anti-Ukrainian narratives during his lecture, including accusing Ukraine of starting the war in Donbas, claiming that Ukrainian language "doesn't exist anymore and won't be needed in Europe", promoting a union with Russia because "this is a strong state with good salaries, and we have a brainless nation" and that Sevastopol "finally has a normal life" after the annexation of Crimea. When the student openly opposed his claims, the professor ordered one of the students to take her out of the lecture hall. Anti-Ukrainian sentiment in the higher educational institution was revealed only after the publication of moral abuse by one of the students on Facebook.

=== Ilya Kiva's dissertation ===
In 2020 controversial pro-Russian politician Ilya Kiva defended a PhD in government administration with a thesis "Civic Society Mechanisms of Influence on governmental regulation in law enforcement (exemplified by the EU and Ukraine)" Apart from a backlash, investigations by media proved several fraudulent actions during the PhD defense.

In November 2021, Kiva alleged that his PhD was rebuked and threatened a lawsuit. The Ministry of Education and Science of Ukraine responded by claiming that the PhD was never finalized by them in the first place.

== Notable alumni ==
=== Multiple degrees ===
- Zhan Beleniuk, Olympic Gold Medalist and a deputy of Verkhovna Rada of Ukraine. Master's Degree in Organization Management and Administration (2016); PhD in public administration (2023).
- Volodymyr Groysman, former Prime Minister of Ukraine Bachelor's Degree in Law (2002); Specialist's Degree in Law (2003).
- Oleksandr Marochenko, former deputy of Verkhovna Rada of Ukraine, soldier in Russo-Ukrainian War. Bachelor's Degree in Management (2004); Specialist's Degree in Management (2005).
- Vasyl Virastyuk, 2004 World's Strongest Man and a deputy of Verkhovna Rada of Ukraine. Bachelor's Degree in Management (2013), Master's Degree in Management of Organizations and Administration (2015).

=== Bachelor's degree ===
- Vasyl Volha, former deputy of Verkhovna Rada of Ukraine accused of treason in 2018
- Oleksandr "s1mple" Kostyliev, Ukrainian professional Counter-Strike 2 player for FaZe Clan. Bachelor's Degree in Marketing (2024).
- Volodymyr Zhemchuhov, Hero of Ukraine. Bachelor's Degree in Management (2025).

=== Specialist's degree ===
- Mykhailo Holovko, Ukrainian politician. Specialist's Degree in Law (2011).
- Andriy Reva, former Minister of Social Policy of Ukraine. Specialist's Degree in Law.
- Volodymyr Rybak, Hero of Ukraine (posthumously). Specialist's Degree in Law (2002).
- Yevhen Cherniak, Ukrainian businessman. Specialist's degree in law (2004).
- Tetiana Chornovol, journalist, civic activist, deputy of Verkhovna Rada of Ukraine. Specialist in Law (2019).

=== Master's degree ===
- Oleksiy Honcharuk, former Prime Minister of Ukraine. Master's Degree in Law (2007).
- Andriy Lunin, Ukrainian footballer. Master's Degree in International Relations (2024).
- Iryna Merleni, Olympic Gold Medalist. Master's Degree in Regional Geography (2013).
- Nataliya Skakun, Olympic Gold Medalist. Master's Degree in Administration Management (2008).
- Mykhailo Radutskyi, deputy of Verkhovna Rada of Ukraine. Master's Degree in Public Administration (2023).
- Elbrus Tedeyev, Olympic Gold Medalist and former deputy of Verkhovna Rada of Ukraine. Master's Degree in Finance (2006).

=== PhD ===
- Valeriy Bozhyk, deputy of Verkhovna Rada of Ukraine. PhD in law (2020).
- David Duke, American politician, Holocaust denier, former Grand Wizard of the Louisiana based Knights of the Ku Klux Klan, and former member of the Louisiana House of Representatives.
- Ilya Kiva, former deputy of Verkhovna Rada of Ukraine tried for treason in 2022, killed in Russia in 2023.

== See also ==
- Antisemitism in Ukraine
- Racism and discrimination in Ukraine
- History of the Jews in Russia and the Soviet Union
- History of anti-Semitism
- Zionology
