= Mykhailo Honcharenko =

Ukrainian economist

- Михайло Гончаренко
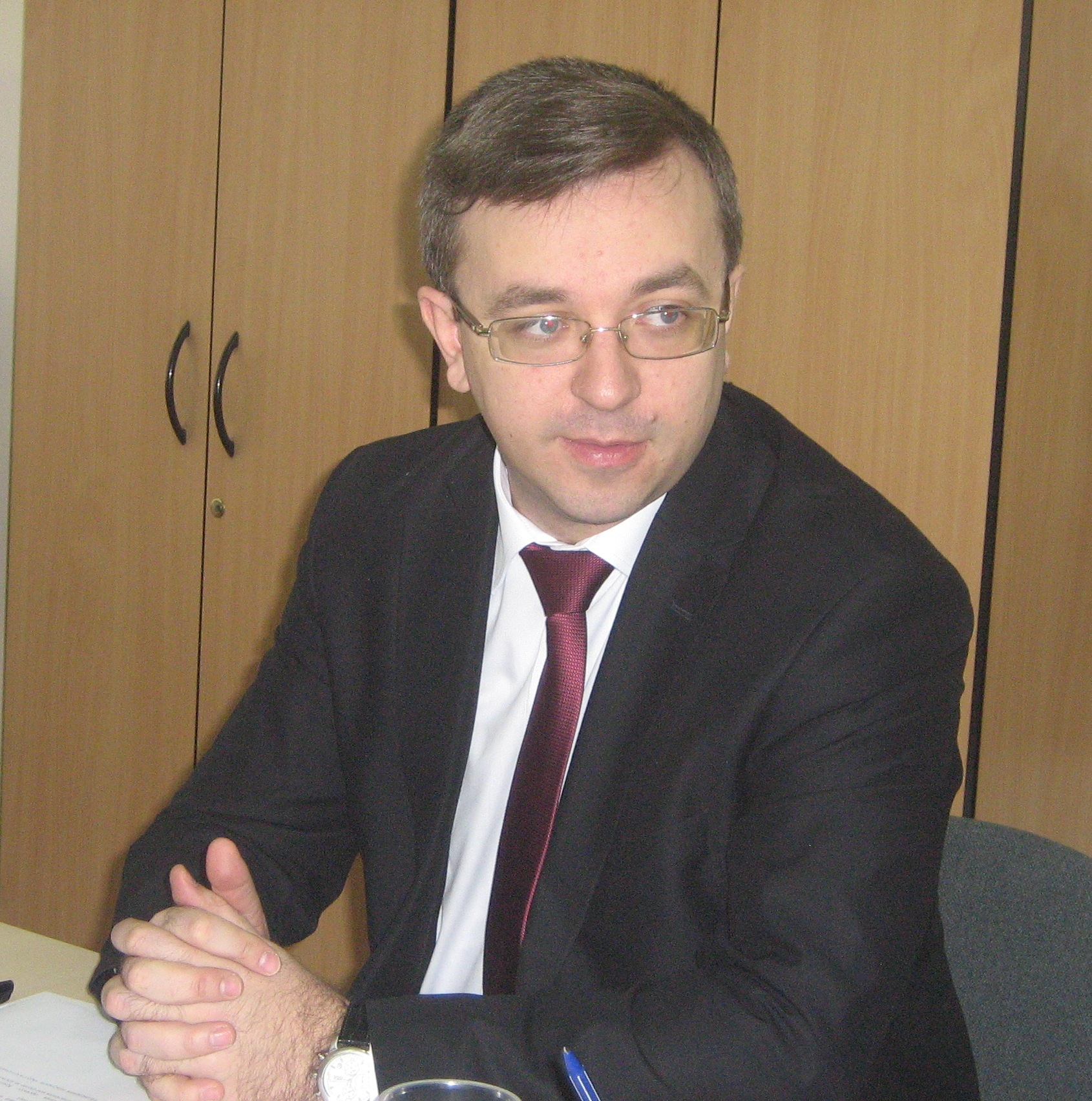
- Honcharenko in 2012

Head of State Inspection of Educational Establishments of Ukraine
- In office August 2011 – March 2014

Personal details
- Born: 15 December 1975 (age 50) Stebliv, Cherkasy Oblast, Ukrainian SSR, Soviet Union
- Education: State Academy of Light Industry of Ukraine (GALPU) (now Kyiv National University of Technologies and Design); Candidate of Economic Sciences (2011); Doctor of Economic Sciences (2021)

Mykhailo Fedorovych Honcharenko (Ukrainian: Михайло Федорович Гончаренко; alternatively spelled as Goncharenko in certain sources; born 15 December 1975) is a Ukrainian economist, educator and ex-government official specializing in Sustainable development. He was the first Head of the State Inspection of Educational Establishments of Ukraine (August 2011 – March 2014).

Cavalier of Order of Merit, Third Class (2014) for important input in social, economic, scientific, cultutral and education development.

== Education ==
- Irpin Industrial College (now Irpin State Tax University) (1992-1995)
- State Academy of Light Industry of Ukraine (GALPU) (now Kyiv National University of Technologies and Design), engineer-economist degree (1995-1998).
- Interdisciplinary institute of Continuing Education, degree in management of intellectual property (1998-2002)
- Candidate of Economic Sciences (2011)
- Doctor of Economic Sciences (2021)

== Government Official ==
In 1998 Honcharenko started working in State Patent Agency of Ukraine (now Ukrainian Institute of Intellectual Property), eventually progressing to State Agency on Investment and Innovations and then Ministry of Education.

In 2002 he worked as an expert in the office of Vice Prime Minister of Ukraine regarding humanitarian issues. From November 2002 to August 2005 he was the Head of Department on Innovation Development in Ministry of Education and Science of Ukraine, fulfilling the same position in Department of Innovation and Technology Transfer in 2006-2007. In 2009-2010 Honcharenko was the Head of Organization and Analytics Department in State Agency on Investment and Innovation of Ukraine.

Starting with May 2010 Honcharenko became the head of Department of Accreditation and Licensing in Ministry of Education and Science of Ukraine. In 2011 he became the first Head of the State Inspection of Educational Establishments of Ukraine, remaining in office until March 2014.

== Teaching career ==
Honcharenko taught disciplines regarding innovation in intellectual property and technology transfer in Ukrainian Institute of Intellectual Property.

In April–July 2014 Honcahrenko held the position of the director of Educational and Scientific Institute of Business Education named after Anatoly Poruchnyk. In August 2014 he started working in Institute of Continuing Education.

=== Interregional Academy of Personnel Management ===
Honcharenko joined Interregional Academy of Personnel Management (IAPM) as vice rector on regional development in October 2014. In February 2020 he became the eighth rector of IAPM and was in office until March 2024.

He currently holds the position of Vice President and teaches economy in the Academy, including postgraduate studies.

== Sustainable Development ==
Apart from regional economy and investments, one of primary research interests of Honcharenko is Sustainable development. Stemming from his interest in innovation and technology transfer established in 2004 in Ways of Innovative Development of Ukraine, research eventually branched into sustainable development established in an edited book. Since 2016 he holds the position of scientific consultant of research Center of Ecological Security and Sustainable Development in IAPM.

== Personal life ==
Married, has two sons.

== See also ==
- Interregional Academy of Personnel Management
- Georgy Shchokin
