= Serhiy Tymchenko =

Ukrainian politician (born 1972)

- Born: 29 July 1972 (age 54); Krasnyi Luch, Ukrainian SSR, Soviet Union
- Occupation: Politician

Serhiy Mykhaylovych Tymchenko (Ukrainian: Сергій Михайлович Тимченко; born 29 July 1972) is a Ukrainian politician, chairman of Ukrainian State Agency of land resources (2011—2014).

== Biography ==
Serhiy Tymchenko was born 29 July 1972 Krasnyi Luch, Luhansk Oblast. He was a junior Ukrainian boxing champion in 1984 and 1985.

He graduated from Donbass Mining and Metallurgical Institute in 2008.Hr graduated with a master's degree in management from Donetsk State University of Management in 2008. In 2012, he graduated with a master's degree from Kharkiv National Agrarian University.

== Career ==
Worked as deputy Director of the Motor Plus ltd. in Lugansk. In 2003—2005 was the head of organizational Department and deputy chairman of Lugansk regional branch of the Party of Regions. In 2005—2007 was the assistant to the people's Deputy of Ukraine in the Verkhovna Rada.

In 2007—2008 he was first Deputy Director General of the Center of the state land cadastre at the State Committee of Ukraine on land resources.

Since 2008 to 2010 worked as adviser to the Secretary of the national security and defense Council of Ukraine Raisa Bogatyrova.

In 2010 spearheaded The main Department of control over the improvement of Kiev, and then was appointed as deputy general Director — manager of technical programs in Center of the state land cadastre.

Since June 2011 to March 2014 was the chairman of State Agency of land resources of Ukraine. Among the main achievements of the Agency at the period of Serhiy Tymchenko's management the experts mark to opening of State land cadastre of Ukraine at 1 January 2013.

Tymchenko also held a number of positions in sports organizations:

- 2006—2012 — Chairman of the Board of Trustees of the Boxing Federation of Lviv region of Ukraine;
- 2012—2017 — Chairman of the Board of Trustees of MMA Russia;
- 2008—2015 — President and founder of the Combat club Power of Siberia Woodang in China (TIM CHEN CO).

Lives in USA since 2017. Founded the International Institute of Strategic Land Reforms in Princeton, New Jersey.

== Awards ==
- 2012 — Order of Merit, 3rd class.
- 2013 — Medal of the Cabinet of Ministers of Ukraine.
- 2014 — Award of the Union of MMA by Fedor Emelianenko.
