= Rostyslav Shchokin =

Ukrainian educator (born 1980)

- Ростислав Георгійович Щокін
- Born: 25 November 1980 (age 45); Kyiv, Ukrainian SSR, Soviet Union
- Occupations: Legal scholar, higher education administrator
- Employer: Interregional Academy of Personnel Management
- Known for: President of MAUP
- Title: Doctor of Law, Full Professor

Rostyslav Shchokin (Ukrainian: Ростислав Георгійович Щокін; born 25 November 1980, Kyiv) is a Ukrainian legal scholar and higher education administrator. He holds a Doctor of Law degree and the academic rank of Professor. Since 2020, he has served as President of the Interregional Academy of Personnel Management (MAUP), a private higher education institution in Ukraine.

Shchokin is also Chair of the Council of the All-Ukrainian Association of Employers' Organizations in Higher Education.

== Early life and education ==
Rostyslav Shchokin was born in Kyiv in 1980. His father, Heorhii Shchokin, is a scholar in psychology and sociology and the founder of the Interregional Academy of Personnel Management. His mother, Rymma Shchokina, worked in the field of preschool education.

Shchokin graduated from Secondary School No. 125 in Kyiv in 1997. He studied banking at the Kyiv National University of Trade and Economics and later obtained a master's degree from the Interregional Academy of Personnel Management in 2002.

In 2014, he earned a Candidate of Legal Sciences degree (a PhD-equivalent qualification in the Ukrainian academic system). In 2019, he earned a Doctor of Law degree (Doctor of Sciences in Law). He was awarded the academic rank of Associate Professor in 2015 and Professor in 2021, specializing in administrative, financial, and banking law.

Academic and research activity

Shchokin is the author of more than 60 academic publications, including two monographs. In 2024, he served as editor of the edited volume "Digital Technologies in Education: Selected Cases". His research interests include administrative law, financial law, governance in higher education, and socio-legal mechanisms of public administration reform. His academic work is indexed in international research databases, including Scopus and Google Scholar.

=== Professional and administrative career ===
Shchokin began his professional career in 2002 as an assistant to the Chair of the supervisory board of MAUP. From 2006 to 2020, he served as Deputy Chair of the supervisory board. In February 2020, he was appointed President of the Interregional Academy of Personnel Management.

During his tenure, MAUP was included in several international and national university rankings, including "QS World University Rankings: Europe 2025", "Times Higher Education World University Rankings 2025", and the national ranking "Top-200 Ukraine".

In addition to his role at MAUP, Shchokin serves as Chair of the Council of the All-Ukrainian Association of Employers' Organizations in Higher Education and as Chair of the Board of the Confederation of Private Higher Education Institutions of Ukraine. He is also a member of the Presidium of the Union of Rectors of Ukraine and the Council of the Federation of Employers of Ukraine.

=== Sports activity ===
Shchokin holds the title of Master of Sports of Ukraine, awarded for achievements in powerlifting (1996) and practical shooting (2025). Since 2010, he has served as President of the Kyiv City Wrestling Association, where he has been involved in the development and promotion of wrestling at the city level. In 2025, Shchokin won the Ukrainian national championship in practical shooting in the handgun open division.

In the same year, under his leadership, the Interregional Academy of Personnel Management (MAUP) received the Platinum Certificate of the International University Sports Federation (FISU) Healthy Campus programme; at the same time, it was the only higher education institution in Ukraine holding this status.

=== Political activity ===
In 2006, Shchokin ran as a candidate in the parliamentary elections to the Verkhovna Rada of Ukraine (5th convocation), representing the Ukrainian Conservative Party.

== Personal life ==
Shchokin is married and has three children.

He has also supported the sporting development of his sons, who compete in Ukrainian kickboxing (WAKO) at the national and international levels.

Askold Shchokin is a 2023 European Champion among juniors. He won the junior European Championship in 2023, earning a gold medal at the European Championships in Istanbul, Turkey, helping the Ukrainian national team achieve 6th place in the overall standings. At the 2024 World Championships in Budapest, he placed third in the Full Contact division (05 FC 293 OJ M -67 kg).

Vsevolod Shchokin is a 2024 World Champion. He won the gold medal at the WAKO Youth World Championships in Budapest in the LC 121 J M +94 kg category. He is also a 2023 European Vice-Champion, having earned the silver medal at the continental championships in Istanbul.
