= Oleksandr Marchenko (politician) =

Ukrainian politician (1965–2022)

- Олексaндр Мaрченко
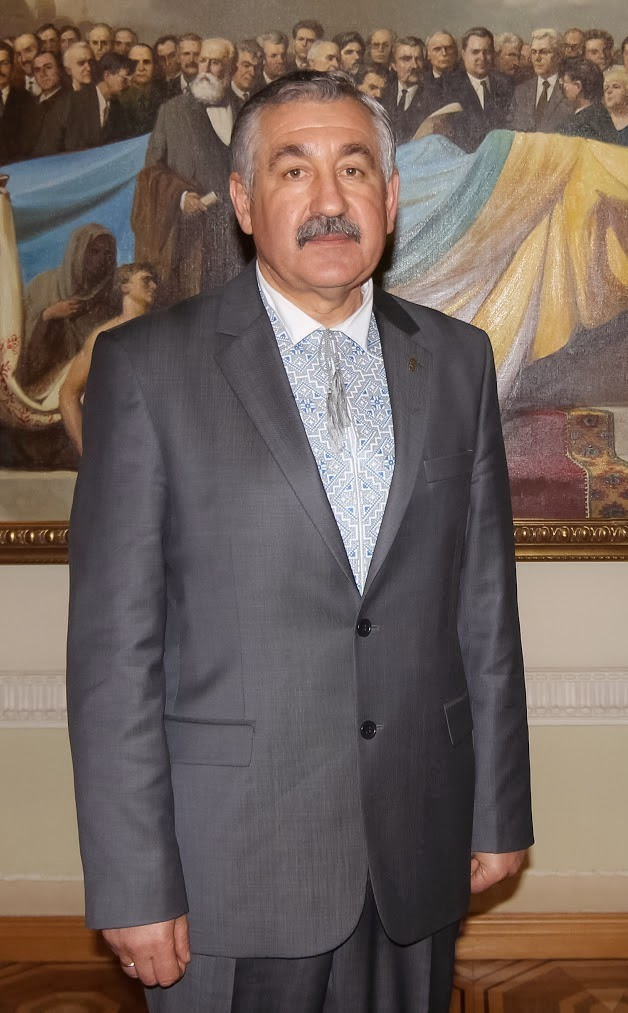
- Marchenko in 2014

Member of the Verkhovna Rada
- In office 27 November 2014 – 29 August 2019

Personal details
- Born: Oleksandr Oleksandrovych Marchenko; 14 January 1965 Rybchyntsi, Vinnytsia Oblast, Ukrainian SSR, Soviet Union
- Died: 6 March 2022 (aged 57) Moshchun, Kyiv, Ukraine
- Cause of death: Killed in action
- Party: Svoboda
- Education: Interregional Academy of Personnel Management

Oleksandr Oleksandrovych Marchenko (Ukrainian: Олекса́ндр Олекса́ндрович Ма́рченко; 14 January 1965 – 6 March 2022) was a Ukrainian politician.

A member of Svoboda, he served from 2014 to 2019 in the Verkhovna Rada, the unicameral parliament of Ukraine.

== Early life ==
He was born on 14 January 1965 in Rybchyntsi, which was then part of the Ukrainian SSR in the Soviet Union. After graduating from the Interregional Academy of Personnel Management with a degree in management of organizations and later also from the Kyiv Construction College with a degree in civil engineering. He then worked as a chief engineer, foreman, and mason at a variety of private and state owned enterprises. Afterwards, from 1994, he became owner and head of the PE "Kamenyar". During the time of the 1990s, he became chairman of the board of ALC "Bila Tserkva Quarry", founder of the Oleksandr Marchenko Charitable Foundation, head of the Boxing Federation of the city of Bila Tserkva, and Bila Tserkva city NGO "Sports Club 'Kamenyar'".

== Political career ==
In 2002, he was elected a deputy of the Bila Tserkva City Council in constituency No. 40 from the party Svoboda. In 2008, he was appointed by the party as the local head of the party organization for the city of Bila Tserkva. He was reelected to the city council multiple times until 2014, and in 2012 he became head of the party organization of Svoboda for Kyiv. That same year, in the 2012 Ukrainian parliamentary election, he ran for constituency No. 90 (Bila Tserkva) for Svoboda, which he initially won against Party of Regions candidate Vitaliy Chudnovsky, however the election results were later ruled falsified by the local court and Marchenko was stripped of his mandate.

From 2012-2014 he worked as an assistant to MP Oleh Helevei, before he himself was elected to the Verkhovna Rada in the 2014 Ukrainian parliamentary election in constituency no. 90. In parliament, he served as head of the Svoboda faction.

== Military service and death ==
In 2014 he joined a militia unit organized by Svobada called the "Freedom Legion" to fight in the Russian-Ukrainian war. He served as a fighter in the 72nd Separate Mechanized Brigade, which defended Avdiivka, for which he was later awarded the medal "For the Defense of Avdiivka". On 10 March 2014 he was wounded near Khrustalnyi as a result of shelling by a BM-30 Smerch. He briefly returned to the front lines in May 2015 on a leave of absence to build fortifications.

He was killed in action in Moshchun, Kyiv, while resisting the 2022 Russian invasion of Ukraine on 6 March 2022, at the age of 57.
