= Volodymyr Zhemchuhov =

Ukrainian guerilla fighter (born 1970)

Volodymyr Pavlovych Zhemchuhov
- Володимир Павлович Жемчугов
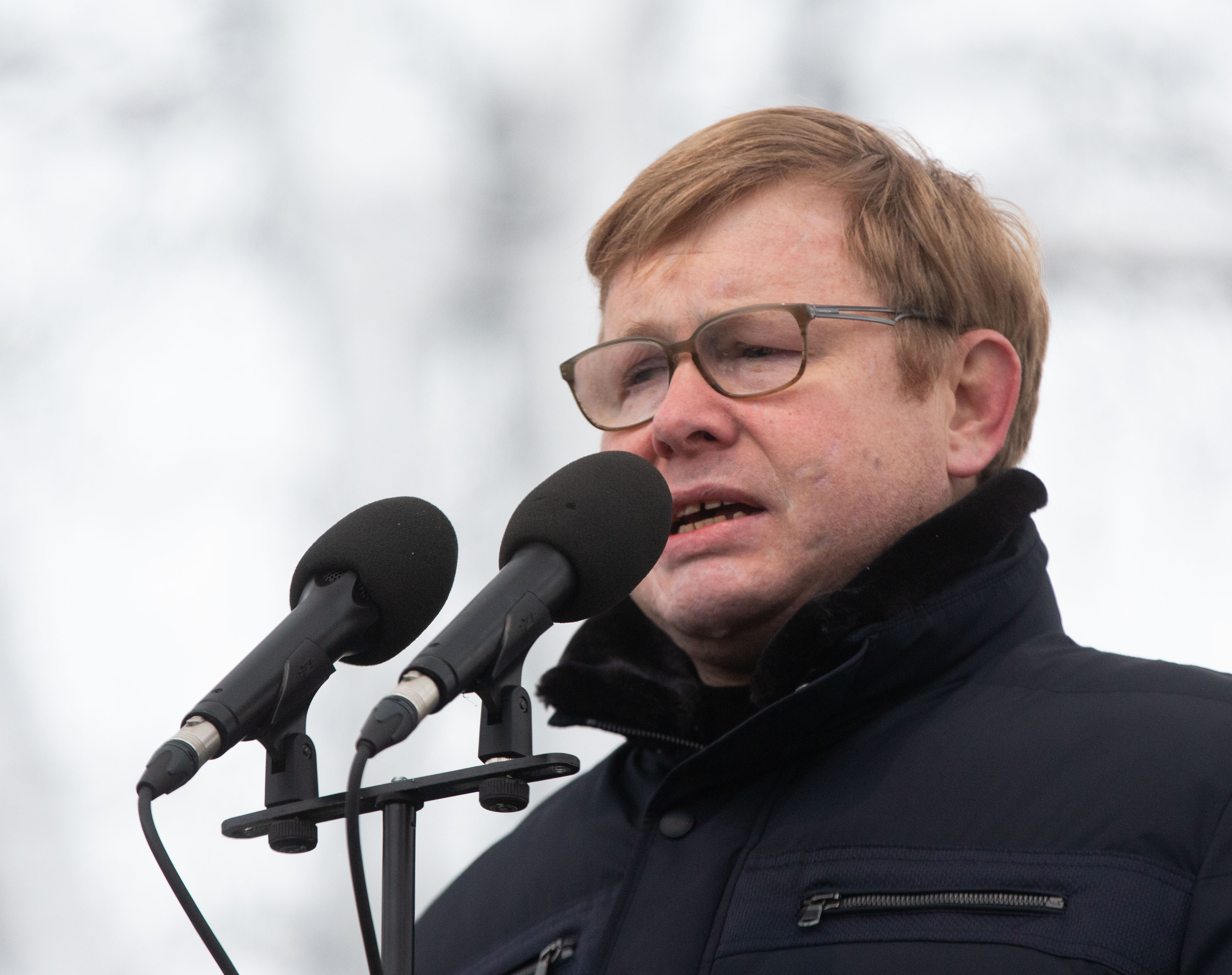
- Born: 7 September 1970 (age 56); Krasnyi Luch, Voroshilovhrad Oblast, Ukrainian SSR, Soviet Union (now Ukraine)
- Alma mater: Alchevsk Mining and Metallurgical Institute
- Military career
- Allegiance: Ukraine
- Branch: Lutuhyne Partisan Movement; Ukrainian Ground Forces
- Service years: 2015-2016; 2022-present
- Rank: Senior Lieutenant
- Conflicts: Russo-Ukrainian war; War in Donbas; Full-scale invasion of Ukraine
- Awards: Hero of Ukraine

Volodymyr Pavlovych Zhemchuhov (Ukrainian: Володимир Павлович Жемчугов; born 7 September 1970) is a Ukrainian insurgent, who fought against the Donetsk and Luhansk People's Republics, two former puppet states of the Russian Federation in Eastern Ukraine's Donbas region.

== Life & career ==
Zhemchuhov was born in the city of Krasnyi Luch, Luhansk Oblast. He graduated from the local technological institute. Following the collapse of the Soviet Union, Zhemchuhov lived and worked in Georgia. After the start of the War in Donbas, he joined the ranks of the Lutuhyne Partisan Movement, a pro-Ukrainian guerilla group from Lutuhyne, which was involved in various acts of sabotage across the region, and participated in over 30 missions. On 15 September 2015, Zhemchuhov was severely wounded when he stepped on a landmine after returning from a mission near Khriashchuvate, a suburb of Luhansk. As the result of the detonation, he lost both forearms, as well as his eyesight and suffered severe fragmentation injuries. After being treated in Luhansk, he was detained and tortured by LPR authorities.

On 16 September 2016, he was released from captivity. He was brought to Germany for further treatment. On 22 January 2017, President Petro Poroshenko awarded Zhemchuhov with the title Hero of Ukraine.
