= Michman =

Rank of the Russian and Soviet navies

Michman (Russian: мичман, IPA: [ˈmʲit͡ɕmən], lit. 'midshipman') is a rank used by the Russian Navy and a number of former communist states. The rank is a non-commissioned officer's and is equivalent to praporshchik in armies and air forces. Within NATO forces, the rank is rated as OR-8 and is equivalent to Warrant officer class 2 or Senior chief petty officer in English speaking navies.

== Russia ==
Michman мичман
- Michman since 2010
- Country: Russia
- Service branch: Russian Navy
- Formation: 1716 (Historic); 1940
- Abolished: 1917
- Next higher rank: Starshy michman
- Next lower rank: Glavny starshina of the ship
- Equivalent ranks: Praporshchik

While the rank michman is etymologically borrowed from the English rank midshipman, michman is a very senior and experienced enlisted rank, equivalent to a master chief petty officer or warrant officer, while midshipman is a cadet in training or a very junior officer rank, which, being an officer, is technically higher in rank than any enlisted rank, despite a midshipman's very junior status.

=== Imperial Russia ===
Michman was originally an Ober-ofizer rank, in line to the Table of Ranks class XII/XIII in the Imperial Russian Navy equivalent to Praporshik of the Imperial Russian Army and classified as junior officer rank.

The rank was abolished in 1917 by the Bolsheviks.

=== Soviet Union and the Russian Federation ===
The rank was reintroduced in 1940.

The ranks of Starshy michman (and in the army and air force, Starshy praporshchik) were added in 1981. The Russian Federation retained the rank structure of the Soviet Union in 1991.

=== Insignia change ===
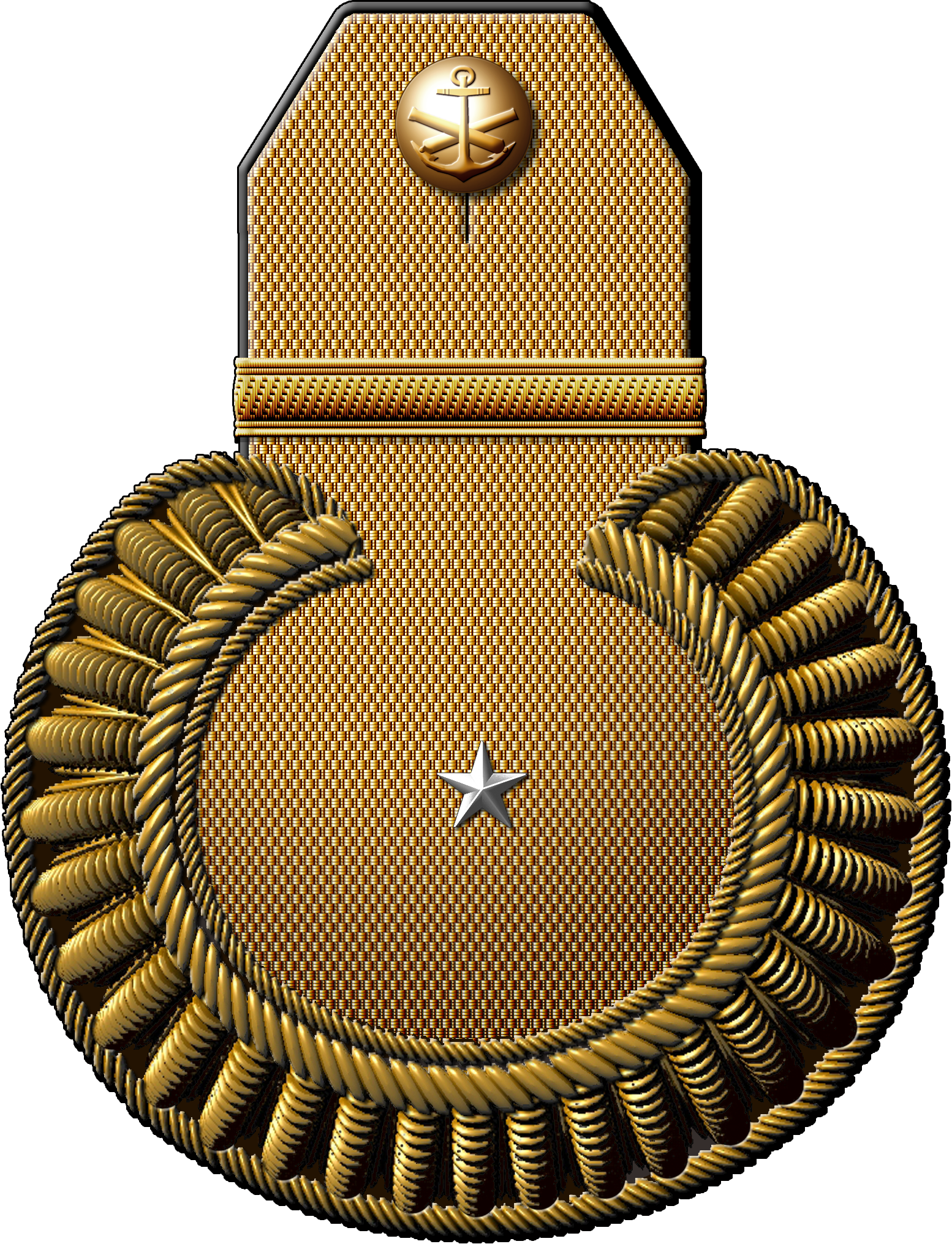
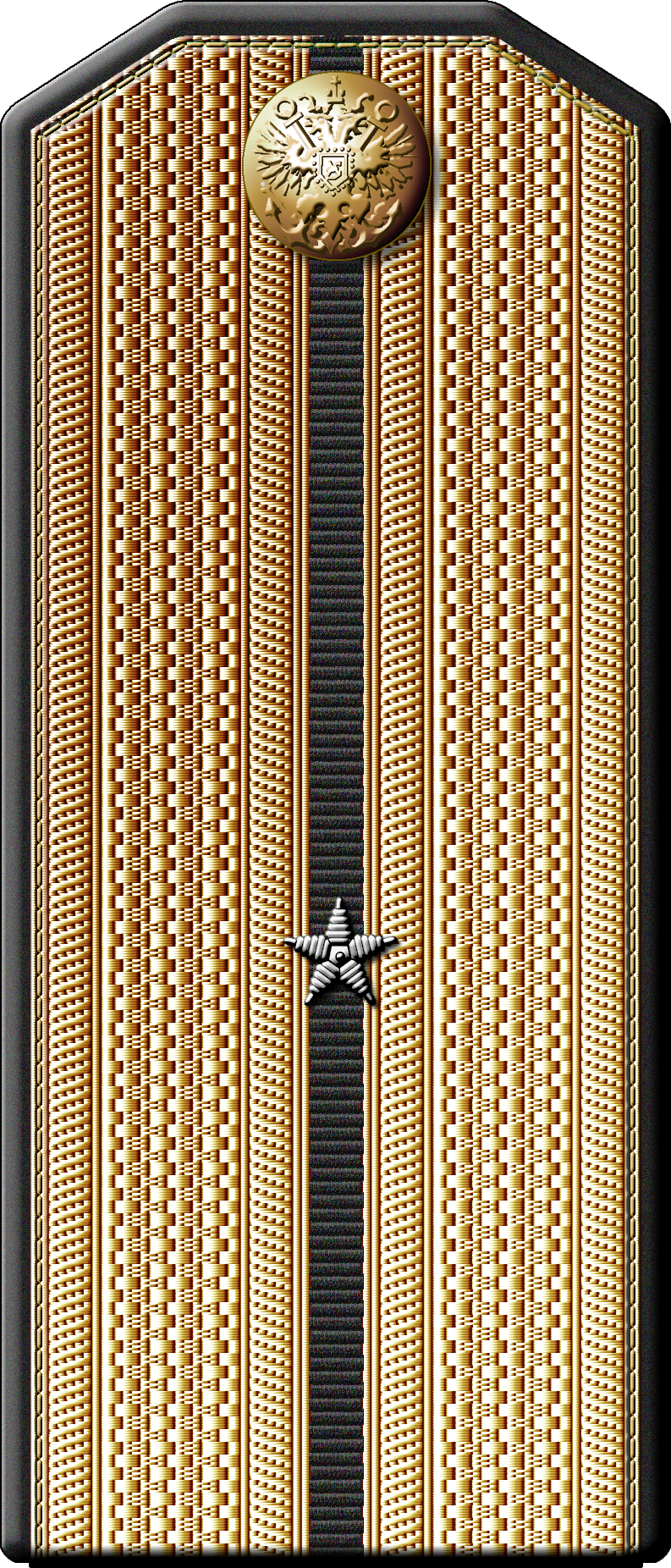
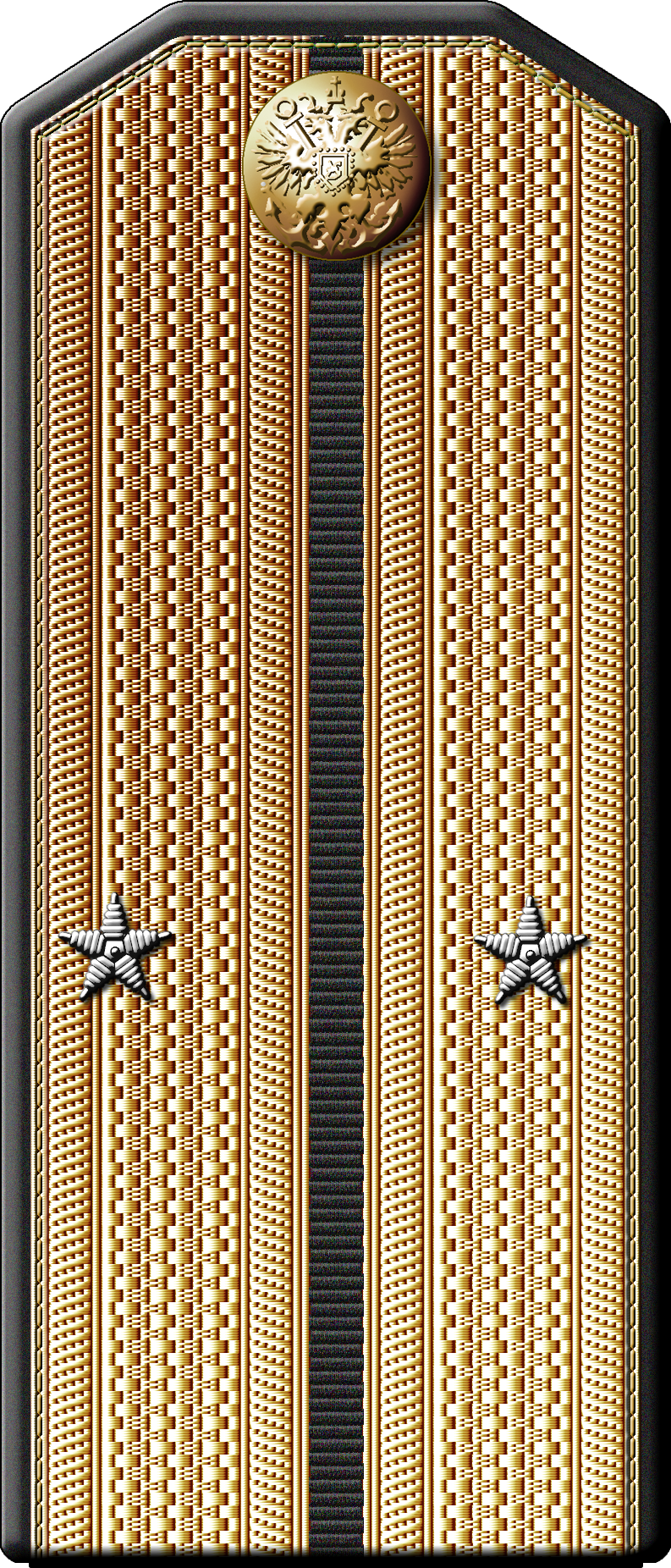
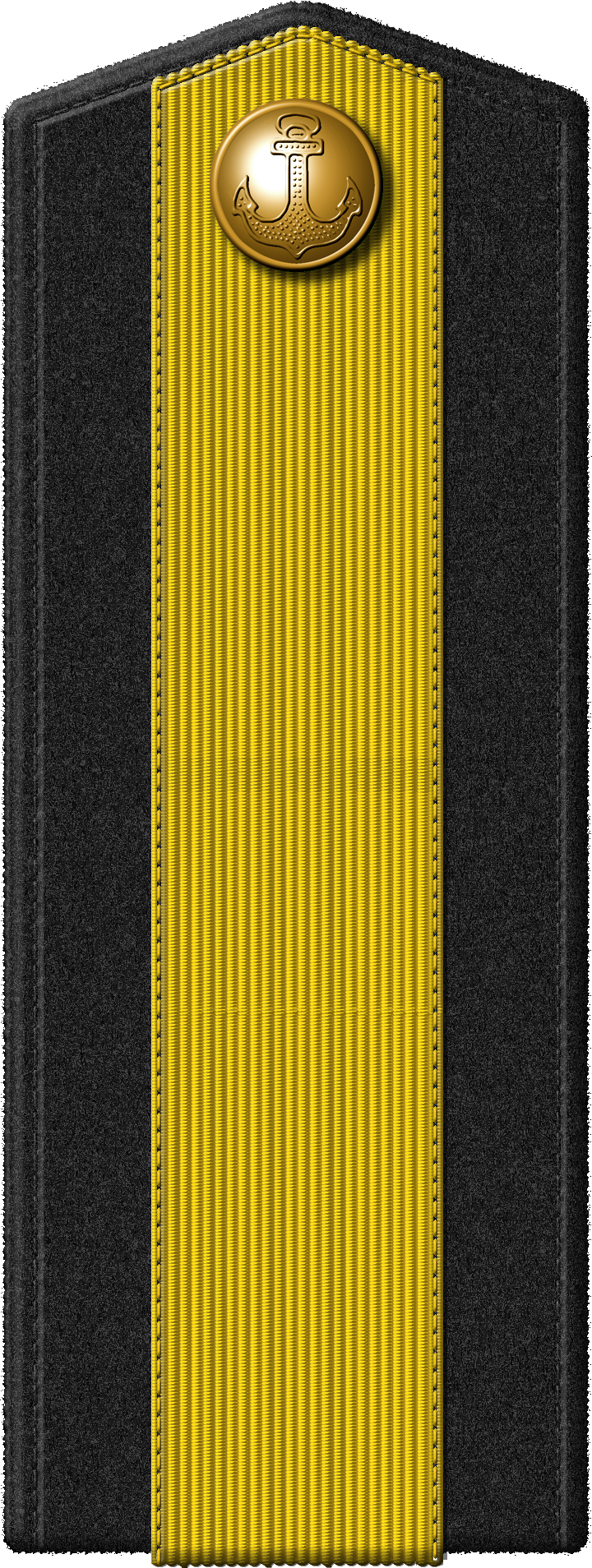
Year	1827	1884	1909	1917	1940	1943	1955	1963	1971	1991	2010
Insignia

== Insignia ==
Miçman
(Azerbaijani Navy)

Мичман
Mičman
(Bulgarian Navy)

Мичман
Michman
(Russian Navy)

== See also ==
- Comparative officer ranks of World War I
- Ranks and rank insignia of the Soviet Army 1943–1955, and Ranks and rank insignia of the Soviet Armed Forces 1955–1991,
- Ranks and rank insignia of the Russian Federation's armed forces 1994–2010
- Naval ranks and insignia of the Russian Federation
