= Starshy michman =

Rank of the Russian and Soviet navies

Starshy michman (Russian: Старший мичман, romanized: Starshiy michman, lit. 'Senior midshipman') is a rank used by the Russian and the Azerbaijani Navy. The rank is a non-commissioned officer's and is equivalent to Starshy praporshchik in armies and air forces.

== Soviet Union and the Russian Federation ==
Starshy michman Старший мичман
- Shoulder insignia since 2010
- Country: Russia
- Service branch: Russian Navy
- Formation: 1981
- Next higher rank: Junior lieutenant
- Next lower rank: Michman
- Equivalent ranks: Starshy praporshchik

In 1981, in conjunction to the enhancement of the michman and praporshchik career groups, both ranks Starshy michman of the navy and Starshy praporshchik of the other armed forces service branches were introduced. Both ranks as well as the career group were taken over by the Armed Forces of the Russian Federation.

Rank insignia

Soviet Union	Russian Federation
Shoulder board (1981–1994)	Shoulder board (1994–2010)

== Insignia ==
Baş miçman
(Azerbaijani Navy)

Старший мичман
Starshy michman
(Russian Navy)

== See also ==
- Ranks and insignia of the Soviet Armed Forces 1955–1991
- Ranks and insignia of the Russian Federation's armed forces 1994–2010
- Naval ranks and insignia of the Russian Federation
