= Georgy Shchokin =

Ukrainian sociologist and psychologist

Georgy Vasilovich Shchokin (ukr.: Гео́ргій Васи́льович Що́кін) (born May 27, 1954, in Zaporizhzhya) is a Ukrainian businessman, sociologist, psychologist and a politician of Russian ethnicity. He is also the founder and owner of MAUP, a private college known for its close ties with David Duke and other Holocaust deniers.

== Biography ==
Shchokin graduated from the Kyiv Pedagogical Institute in 1981.

He is the founder and owner of the Interregional Academy of Personnel Management.

Shchokin heads the Ukrainian "Miloserdiye" Foundation. He is a part owner and vice-president of the two vanity presses — International Biographical Centre (UK) and American Biographical Institute that have been described as scam operations.
