= Khrustalnyi =

City in Luhansk Oblast, Ukraine

Khrustalnyi Хрустальний (Ukrainian)
- City
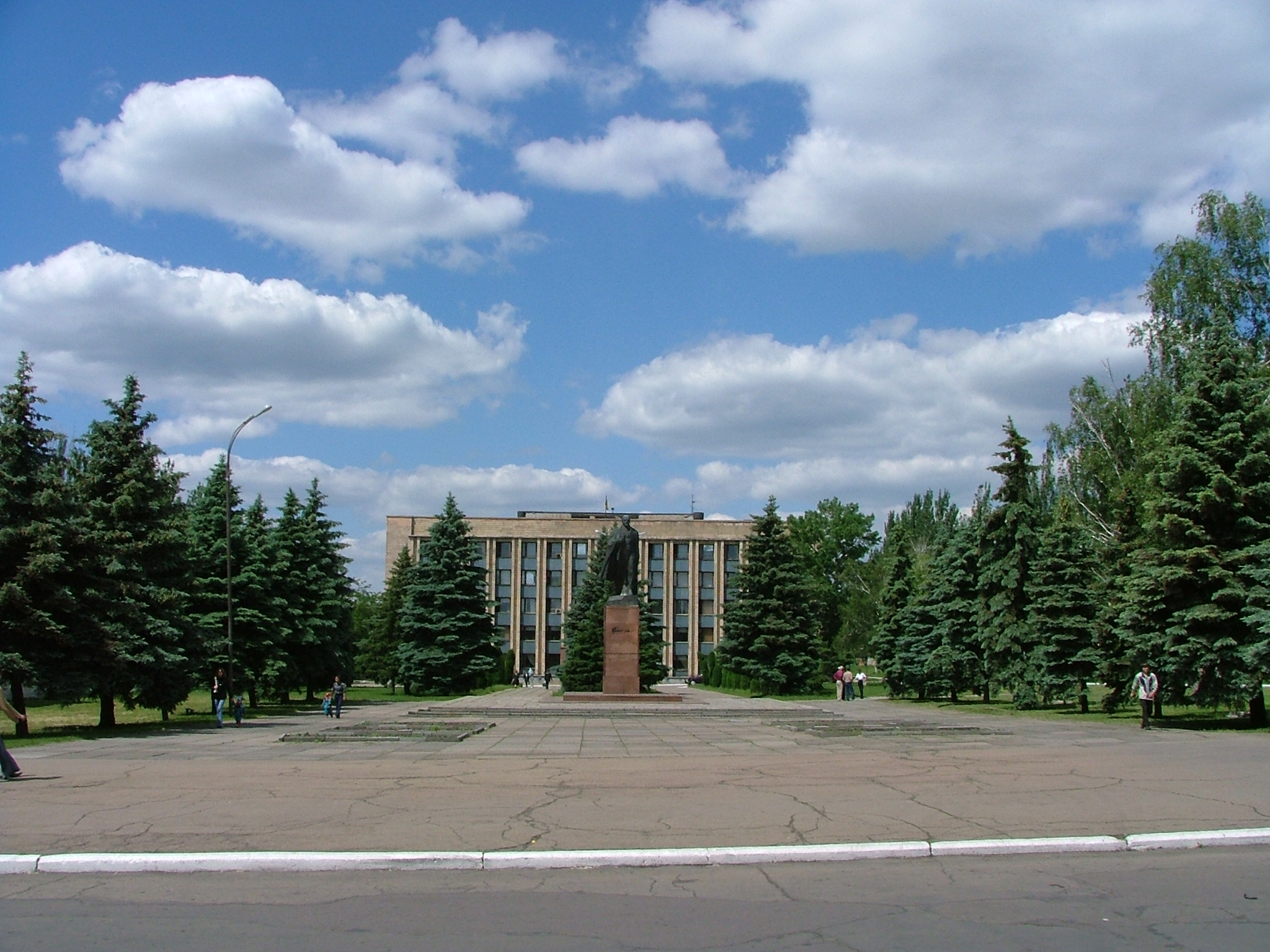
- Executive Committee Building

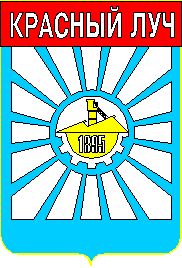
- Flag Coat of arms
- Interactive map of Khrustalnyi
- Location in Luhansk Oblast Location in Ukraine
- Country: Ukraine
- Oblast: Luhansk Oblast
- Raion: Rovenky Raion
- Hromada: Khrustalnyi urban hromada
- Founded: 1880s
- Area: 15,356 km^{2} (5,929 sq mi)
- Elevation: 269 m (883 ft)
- Population (2022): 79,533
- Time zone: UTC+2 (EET)
  - Summer (DST): UTC+3 (EEST)
- Climate: Dfb

Khrustalnyi (Note: Ukrainian: Хрустальний; Russian: Хрустальный) or Krasnyi Luch (Note: Ukrainian: Красний Луч; Russian: Красный Луч) is a city in Luhansk Oblast, eastern Ukraine. Its population is approximately 79,533 (2022 estimate). It has historically been one of the most important coal mining locations in the Donbas region.

The city was founded in the 1880s after the discovery of coal deposits in the region, and grew over the following century. Until 1920, it was known as Kryndachivka, after the surname of an early settler. (Note: Ukrainian: Криндачівка; Russian: Криндачёвка, romanized: Krindachyovka) It was a site of fighting during World War II. Since the beginning of the Russo-Ukrainian War in 2014, it has been occupied by the widely unrecognized Luhansk People's Republic and later by Russia after its Annexation on 30 September 2022.

== History ==
=== Russian Empire ===
The city was founded as a mining site named Kryndachivka in the 1880s in the Russian Empire. The foundation of the site was because of the recent discovery of rich coal deposits in the region. The original name of the city was derived from the name of the man who owned the land, 'Kryndach'. A village grew up around the mining site and rail station.

The first three major mines at the location were built in 1900–1903. At the time, there was a growing demand for coal due to rapid industrialization in the Russian Empire, especially in the southern parts near Kryndachivka. Kryndachivka became one of the most important coal mining centres of the Donbas. However, according to official Soviet sources written after the fact, working conditions were extremely brutal for workers in the mines, who were impoverished and lived in terrible conditions. There were mass demonstrations of workers in 1905, but the mine owners refused to meet the demands of the strikers, deploying Cossacks to disperse the workers with military force.

A single school opened in Kryndachivka in 1906. However, other than this, official Soviet historical sources describe Kryndachivka as a "small and dirty village" on the eve of World War I. There was reportedly no hospital, and residents had to walk long distance for drinkable water. Most residents lived in adobe shacks and dugouts. It had a population of 3,500 by 1913. During the beginning of World War I proper, there were anti-war rallies and protests in the village, with workers refusing to go to the front and clashing with Tsarist authorities. The economic situation worsened during the war, with wages being cut and food prices going up. There was another strike in early 1916 where workers demanded better conditions, but according to Soviet sources it was brutally suppressed, with six workers being jailed and 350 sent to the front.

In the February Revolution of 1917, the Tsar was overthrown, causing more pro-worker unrest in Kryndachivka. During the ensuing Russian Civil War, Alexey Kaledin of the anti-Bolshevik White movement deployed his armed Don Cossacks to the Donbas, but was unable to control the mines due to local resistance, according to Soviet sources. Continued violence took place in the village throughout the civil war. In May 1918, during the Central Powers invasion of Ukraine, Kryndachivka was occupied by the Central Powers, further damaging the village's economy. By the end of that year, the Central Powers were expelled, but continued violence in the civil war took place, with the village changing hands several times until the final Bolshevik victory, and the establishment of the communist Soviet Union on the former territories of the Russian Empire.

=== Soviet Union ===
The local economy slowly recovered after the end of the fighting. A local newspaper began being published in Kryndachivka in September 1920. In December 1920 the village was renamed to Krasnyi Luch (lit. '"red ray", or "red beam"'). The settlement continued to grow, receiving city status in 1926, at which time it had a population of 12,425. Infrastructure was built, including hospitals and schools. By 1941, the population had grown to 55,000 - 16 times the population in 1913.

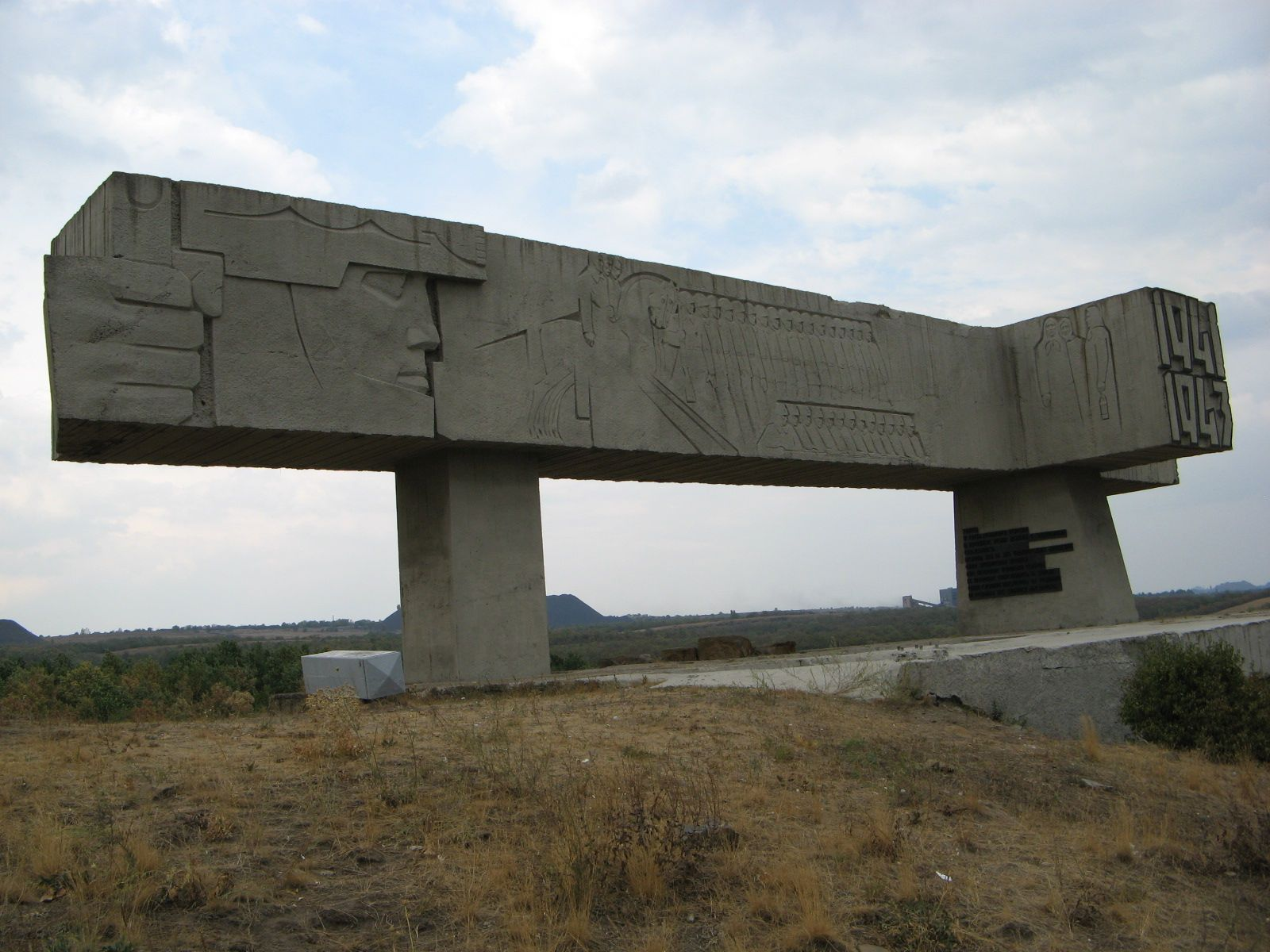
The Mius-Front monument in the city

During World War II, Nazi Germany launched a massive invasion of the Soviet Union. German forces heavily shelled Krasnyi Luch, but were stopped 6 kilometres (3.7 mi) from the city, at the river Mius. Fierce battles took place on the approach to Krasnyi Luch, reportedly holding off the Germans for eight months. The Mius-Front monument has since been installed in the city, to commemorate the brave defense of the city.

However, in summer 1942, the German forces launched a new offensive, and captured the city on 18 June 1942. The local Jewish population was murdered by the Nazis along with other categories of victims, such as Communists, and were thrown into the shaft of the Bogdan coal mine. The total number of victims was around 2,000 people. On 1 August 1943, the well-known WWII fighter pilot Lydia Litvyak took off from a base at Krasnyy Luch, to the last mission from which she never came back.

Krasnyi Luch was liberated by the 51st Army of the Southern Front of the Red Army on 1 September 1943. The Nazis mostly destroyed the city behind them as they left. By the end of the occupation, the population was only 11,400, a fifth of the pre-war numbers. The infrastructure was slowly rebuilt after the end of the occupation.

A coat of arms was adapted in 1978. In January 1989, the city population was 113,278 people. Krasnyi Luch remained an important coal-mining centre. There were several coal-enriching plants, a machine-tool factory, light industries and a railway station.

=== Independent Ukraine ===
Ukraine declared independence in 1991 during the disintegration of the Soviet Union. On 21 April 2004, a new flag was adopted for the city, featuring the blue and yellow bicolor of the Ukrainian flag with imagery of red rays of the sun, gears, and coal superimposed on top.

==== Russo–Ukrainian War ====
The variation of the flag used by the Luhansk People's Republic

During the war in Donbas that began in 2014, Krasnyi Luch fell into the control of the Luhansk People's Republic (LPR), a Russian-led separatist group. The city was reportedly bombed in January 2015 during the battle of Debaltseve. The city's hospital was also used by LPR militants who fought in the battle. Reportedly, Evangelical Christians and other minority Christian denominations in Krasnyi Luch and other cities in Russian-occupied Ukraine were "terrorized" by pro-Russian gunmen throughout 2014 and 2015.

On 12 May 2016, the Ukrainian parliament renamed the city from Krasnyi Luch to Khrustalnyi under Ukrainian decommunization laws. However, the occupying separatists have continued to use the old communist name. Additionally, because the normal flag of the city contains the Ukrainian colors, the LPR authorities have used a variant flag of their own design in which the Ukrainian bicolor is replaced by the colors of the flag of the Luhansk People's Republic.

In accordance with administrative reforms in Ukraine in 2020, Khrustalyni was officially designated by the Ukrainian government to Khrustalnyi urban hromada in Rovenky Raion. However, the LPR - and later explicitly Russia - has never recognized the Ukrainian government's authority over the area, and consider the city to be part of the urban okrug Krasnyi Luch.

During the 2022 Russian invasion of Ukraine, the city was subject to a Ukrainian Tochka-U ballistic missile strike on 16 June 2022 that caused a large Russian ammunition depot belonging to the 2nd Army Corps to detonate. Footage of the attack was uploaded to social media where a group of Luhansk People's Republic militiamen are seen to be sheltering and fleeing from the ensuing ammunition fire. On the night of 23–24 July 2022, Ukrainian intelligence reported another strike by the Ukrainian Armed Forces on a hotel that was being used as a base by Russian soldiers, reportedly killing 100 of them. On 30 September 2022, Russia unilaterally declared its annexation of areas in Luhansk Oblast.

== Demographics ==
Historical population

Year	Pop.	±%
1913	3,500	—
1926	12,425	+255.0%
1941	55,000	+342.7%
1943	11,400	−79.3%
1965	101,000	+786.0%

Year	Pop.	±%
1972	103,000	+2.0%
1989	113,278	+10.0%
2013	82,765	−26.9%
2022	79,533	−3.9%

As of the Ukrainian Census of 2001, the ethnicities and languages of the population were:

Ethnicity

- Ukrainians: 49.2%
- Russians: 46.1%
- Belarusians: 1.1%

Language

- Russian: 87.8%
- Ukrainian: 10.4%
- Armenian: 0.2%
- Belarusian: 0.1%

== Notable people ==
- Oleksiy Boyko (born 1992), Ukrainian footballer
- Mykhailo Byelykh (1958–1997), Soviet-Ukrainian footballer
- Oleksiy Danilov (born 1962), Ukrainian politician
- Anatoliy Konkov (born 1949), Ukrainian footballer
- Oleh Kucherenko (born 1968), Ukrainian and German wrestler
- Natalia Korolevska (born 1975), Ukrainian politician
- Nikita Krylov (born 1992), Ukrainian mixed martial artist
- Artem Hordiyenko (born 1991), Ukrainian footballer
- Volodymyr Mykytin (born 1970), Ukrainian football coach
- Maksym Pashayev (1988–2008), Ukrainian footballer
- Pavel Pashayev (born 1988), Ukrainian footballer
- Viktor Plakida (born 1956), Ukrainian politician
- Hanna Skydan (born 1992), Ukrainian-Azerbaijani hammer thrower
- Serhiy Tymchenko (born 1972), Ukrainian politician
- Volodymyr Zhemchuhov (born 1970), Ukrainian partisan leader
