= Starshy praporshchik =

Highest rank of the praporschchik career group in Russian Federation armed forces

Starshy praporshchik (Russian: Ста́рший пра́порщик, lit. 'Senior ensign') is a rank used by the Russian Ground Forces and a number of former communist states. The rank is a non-commissioned officer's and is equivalent to Starshy michman in navies. It is usually equivalent to warrant officer class 1 or sergeant major in English-speaking armies.

== Russia ==
Starshy praporshchik Ста́рший пра́порщик
- Rank insignia for the army and air force
- Country: Soviet Union (1981-1991); Russia
- Service branch: Russian Ground Forces; Russian Air Force; Russian Police
- Formation: 12 January 1981
- Next higher rank: Junior lieutenant
- Next lower rank: Praporshchik
- Equivalent ranks: Starshy michman

=== Soviet Army and Militia ===
In the Soviet Military, the ranks of starshy praporshchik and starshy michman were introduced in 1981, in an attempt to recreate a corps of contract non-commissioned officers similar to master sergeants and chief petty officers, the role that was previously reserved for senior drafted personnel. Contrary to Western practice of assigning the senior sergeant ranks to veteran soldiers, the Soviet ranks of starshina and sergeant were routinely assigned to 20-year-old soldiers at the end of their 2-year draft. The praporshchiks were aged volunteers and were expected to have more authority over draftsmen than similarly aged sergeants; they are placed in a separate category of "master non-commissioned officers" (praporshchik and michman).

Shoulder boards USSR and Russian Federation (1971 − 1994):
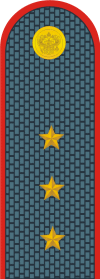
Mechanized infantry, shoulder board army (general) land forces (general)	Technical troops, engineers, armour, artillery, missile troops (including: MT ground forces SMT, Air defence MT), Vehicle transport troops, construction troops	Air Force; Naval aviation Airborne forces	FSIN; MES Russia; Militia (until 2011); Police (from 2011)
Everyday uniform
Starshy praporshchik

=== Praporshchik ranks of the Russian armed forces from 1994 ===
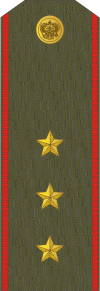
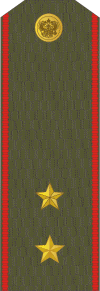
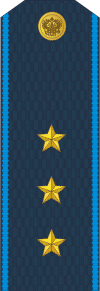
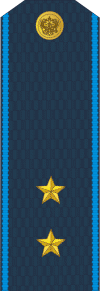
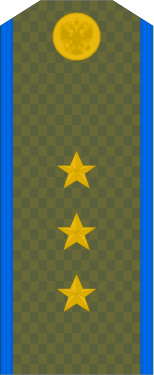
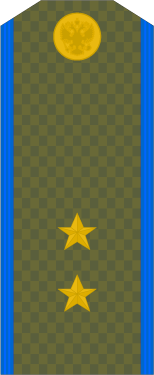
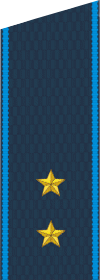
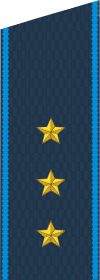
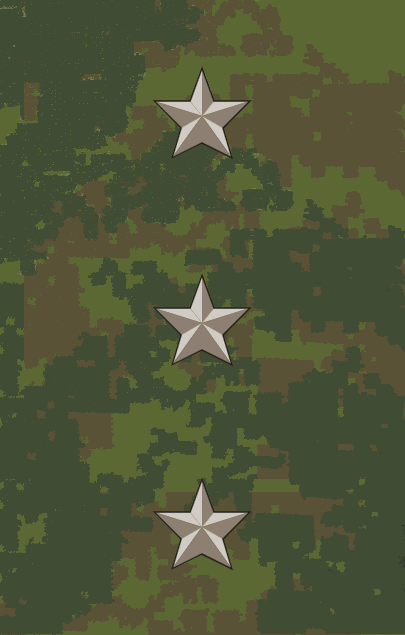
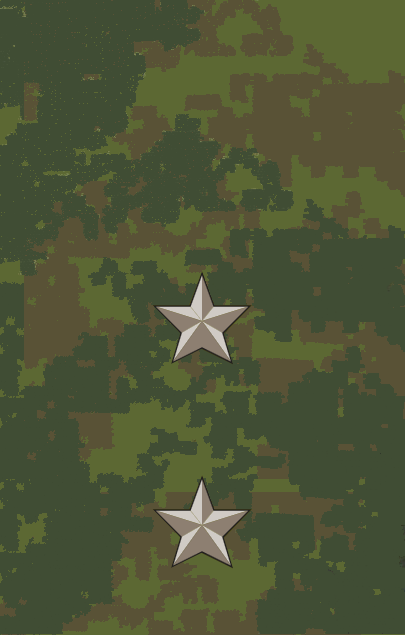
1994-2010	Ground Forces (Army)		Air Force		Airborne Troops		Field uniform
	Starshy praporshchik	Praporshchik	Starshy praporshchik	'Praporshchik	Starshy praporshchik	Praporshchik	Starshy praporshchik	Praporshchik
from 2010	Ground forces (Army)		Air Force		Airborne troops		Fields uniform
					N/A	N/A
	Starshy praporshchik	Praporshchik	Starshy praporshchik	Praporshchik	Starshy praporshchik	Praporshchik	Starshy praporshchik	Praporshchik

== Insignia ==
=== Army ===
ԱՎԱԳ ԵՆԹԱՍՊԱ
Avag yent’aspa
(Armenian Ground Forces)

Baş gizir
(Azerbaijani Land Forces)

Старшы прапаршчык
Staršy praparščyk
(Belarusian Ground Forces)

Nadpraporčík
(Czech Land Forces)

Улук прапорщик
Uluk praporsçik
(Kyrgyz Army)

Ста́рший пра́порщик
Stárshiy práporshchik
(Russian Ground Forces)

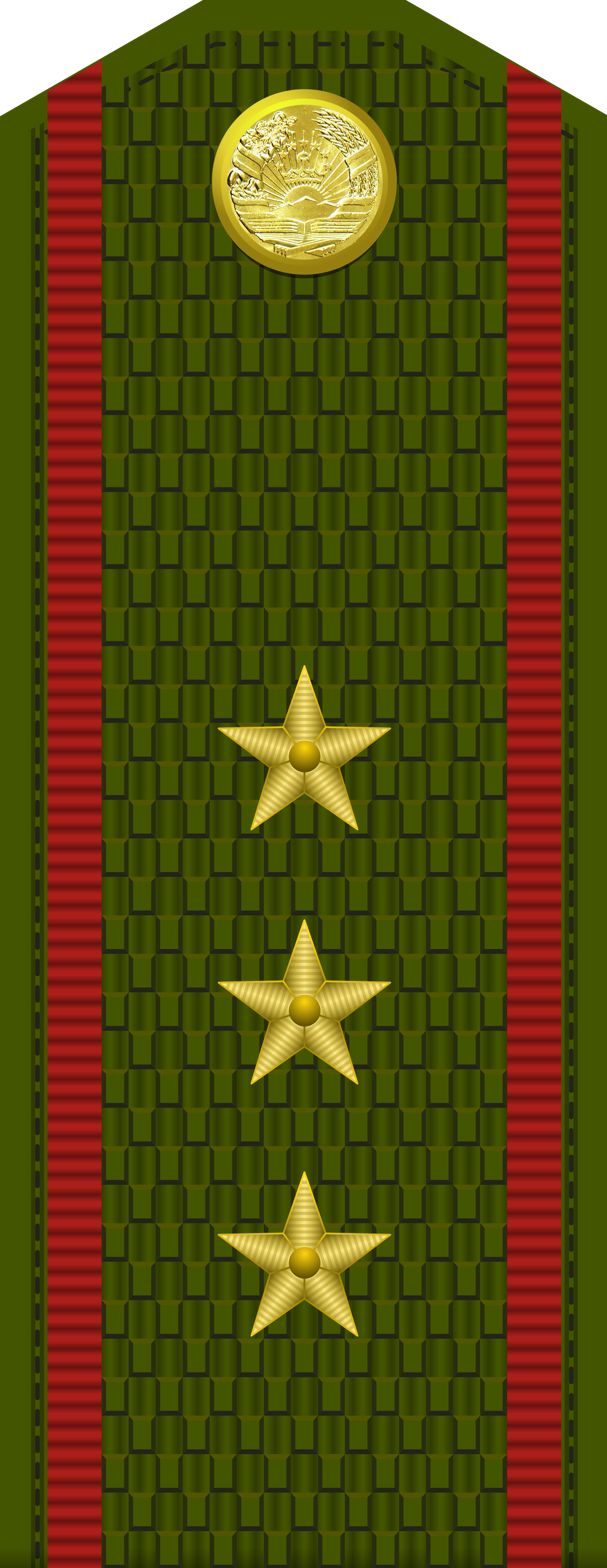
Прапоршики калон
Praporshiki kalon
(Tajik Ground Forces)

=== Air Force ===
ԱՎԱԳ ԵՆԹԱՍՊԱ
Avag yent’aspa
(Armenian Air Force)

Baş gizir
(Azerbaijani Air Forces)

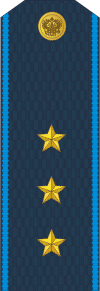
Старшы прапаршчык
Staršy praparščyk
(Belarusian Air Force)

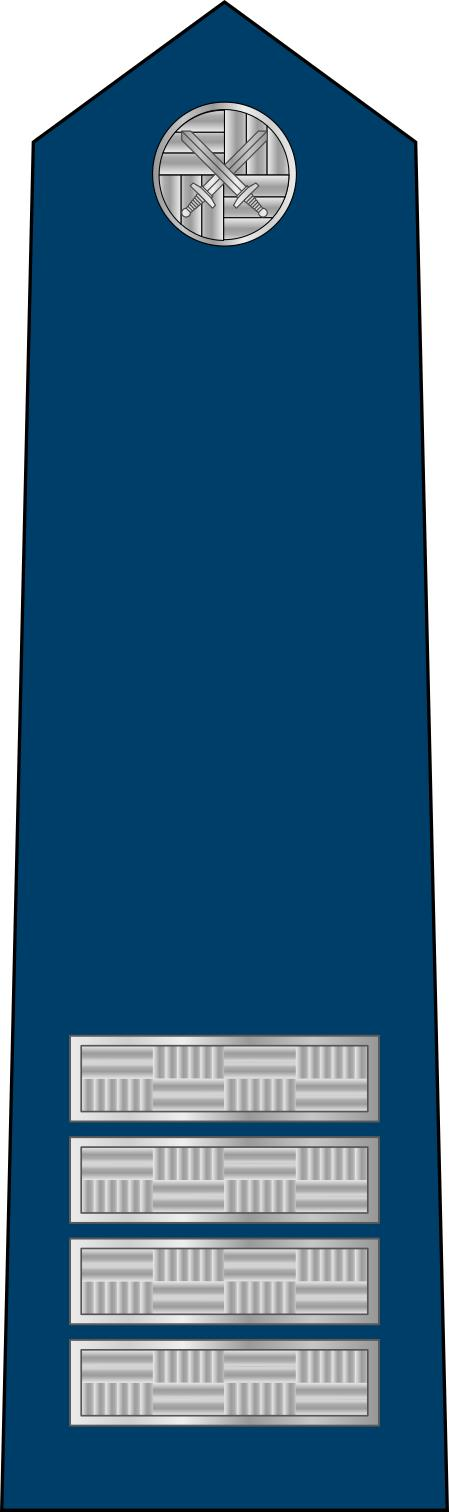
Nadpraporčík
(Czech Air Force)

Улук прапорщик
Uluk praporsçik
(Kyrgyz Air Force)

Ста́рший пра́порщик
Stárshiy práporshchik
(Russian Air Force)

Прапоршики калон
Praporshiki kalon
(Tajik Air Force)

== See also ==
- Ranks and insignia of the Soviet Armed Forces 1955–1991
- Ranks and insignia of the Russian Federation's armed forces 1994–2010
- Army ranks and insignia of the Russian Federation
- Aerospace Forces ranks and insignia of the Russian Federation
