= Starshina =

Military rank and historical civil service rank

Starshina (Russian: Старшина, IPA: [stərʂɨˈna] or Ukrainian: Старшина, romanized: Starshyna) is a senior military rank or designation in the military forces of some Slavic states, and a historical military designation. Depending on a country, it had different meanings. In the 19th century with the expansion of the Imperial Russia into Turkestan and the Central Asia, the word was even used to identify some Turkic leaders as a basic Russian word for aqsaqal (white-beard).

In Cossack armies the term initially identified a commissioned officer. During the times of Cossack Hetmanate, starshyna was a collective noun, and people described with this word were divided into starshyna (officers) and general starshyna (general officers) the latter being part of the Hetman's General Cossack Rada. In Russia the term was later adopted to describe a non-commissioned officer rank. Following the dissolution of the Soviet Union, most of post-Soviet countries have adopted the Russian interpretation of the word.

Since the 1930s in the Soviet and later Russian army terminology, a starshina has been equivalent to "Sergeant Major" (Most senior member at the company level) or a rank equal to a NATO OR-8. In naval terminology, starshina is a general term for junior and middle-ranking non-commissioned officers, similar in usage to "Chief Petty Officer".

The word originates from Old East Slavic language «*старъ»(old)

== Russia ==
=== Imperial Russia ===
Later, in the Tsardom of Russia and Imperial Russia, a volostnoy starshina was the chief of a volost (a rural administrative unit), in charge of the distribution of taxes, resolving conflicts within obshchina (communes), distributing community lands and military conscription. The rank of Voiskovoi starshina (Войсковой старшина – Starshina of the Army (Host)) was introduced into the ranks of the Imperial military in 1826, as the equivalent of a "Lieutenant Colonel" in the Cossack cavalry.

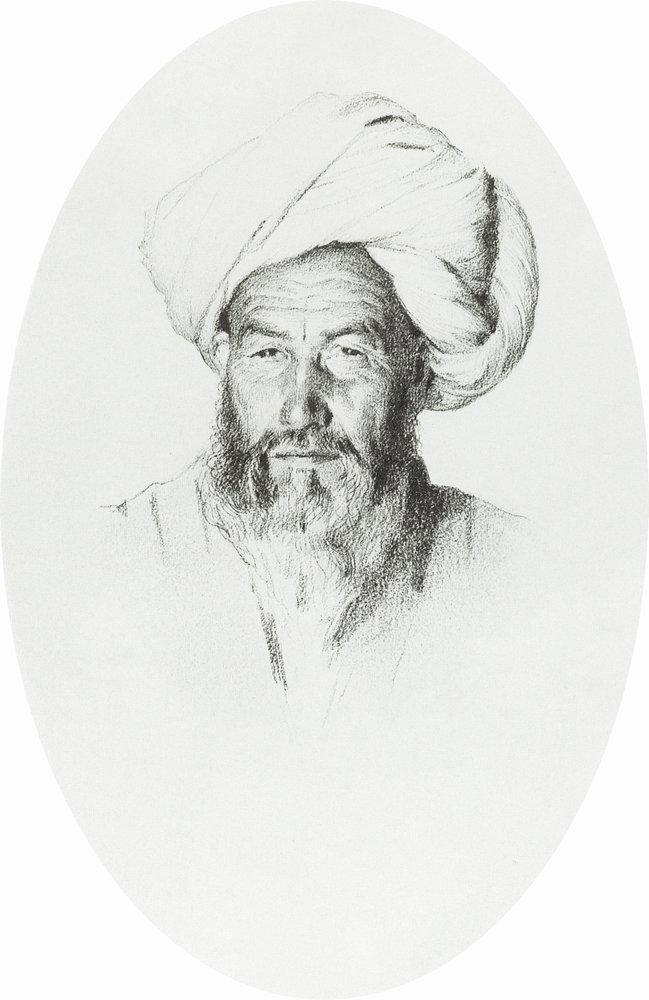
Uzbek, stashina (aqsaqal) village Chodshagent (ru: Ходжагент), 1868, drawing by V.V. Vereshchagin

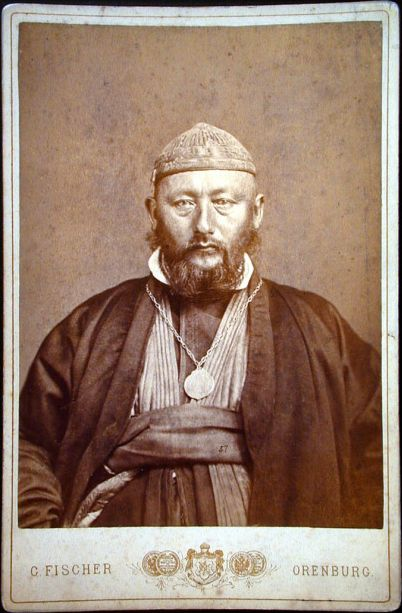
Bashkirs-starshina with starshina insignia (medal), Orenburg, 1892

=== Soviet Union and Russian Federation ===
Starshina Старшина
- Army and air force insignia
- Country: Russia
- Service branch: Russian Ground Forces; Russian Air Force
- Rank group: Non-commissioned officer
- Formation: 1935
- Next higher rank: Praporshchik
- Next lower rank: Stárshy serzhánt
- Equivalent ranks: Glavny starshina of the ship

The word starshina gained its modern meaning in the Red Army, and is a hangover from the functional titles (like "Brigade Commander" or "Assistant Platoon Leader") that were initially used by that force – the word literally means "senior". Most functional titles in the Red Army were abolished in 1942, but starshina remained. Starshina was the highest non-commissioned rank in the Soviet Army until the reintroduction of the imperial rank of Praporshchik in 1972.

In the Soviet Navy, the term starshina was introduced between 1940 and 1943 as term equivalent to "Petty Officer" for every enlisted seaman above "Matros, 1st class." There was also created a rank equal to starshina in the Army, but termed Glavnyy korabel'nyy starshina (transl. Chief Petty Officer of the Ship) – this is the naval rank depicted in the tables below.

==== Insignia in the Red Army (1919–1946) and Soviet Armed Forces (1946–1991) ====
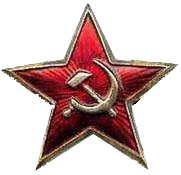
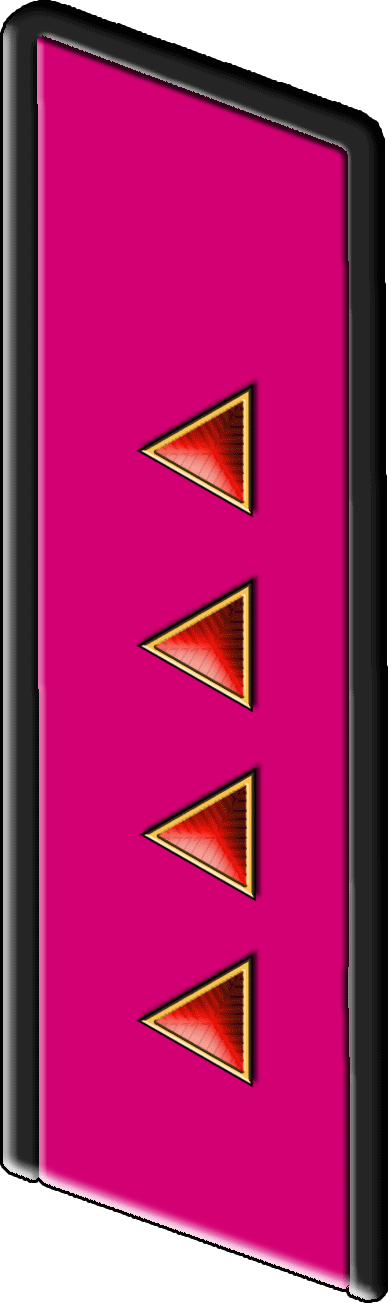
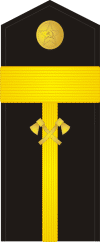
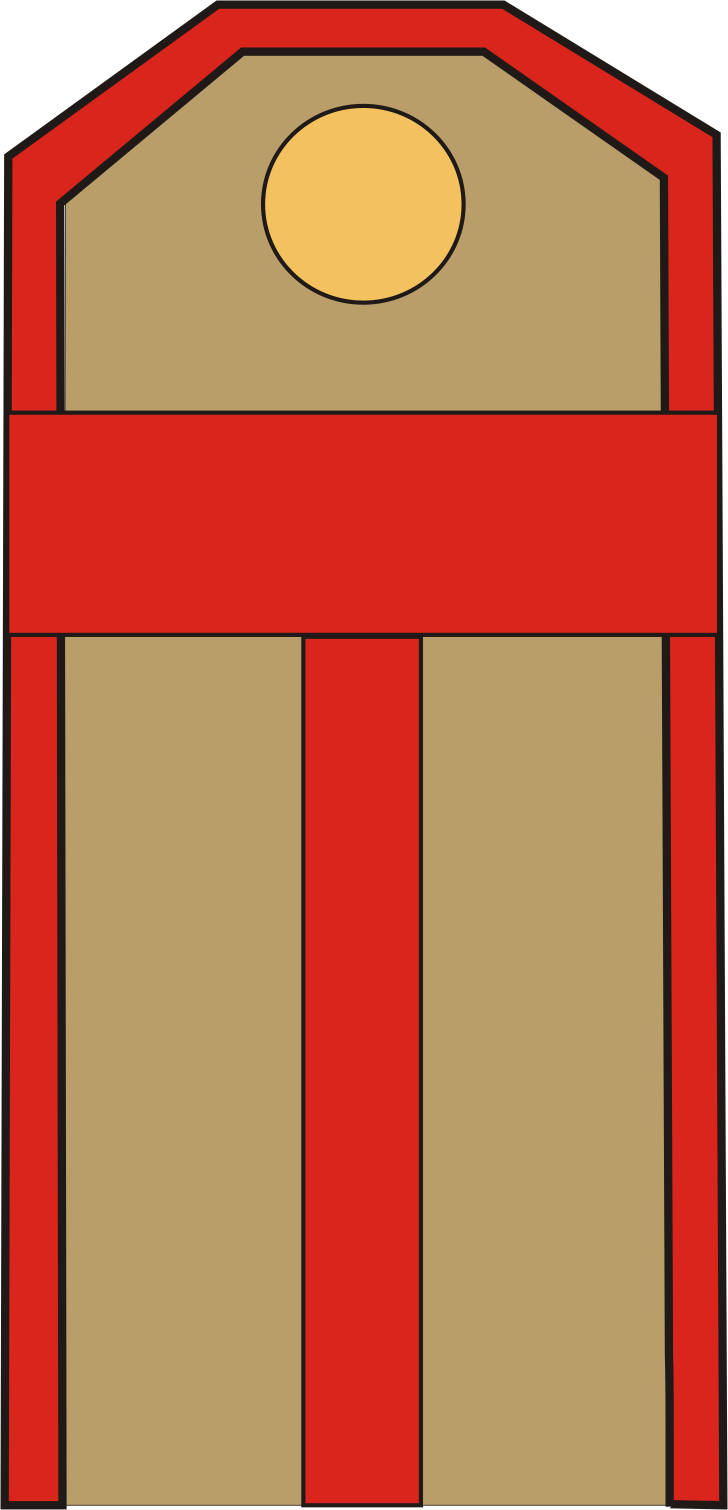
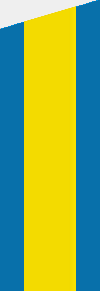
(1919–1924)	collar insignia (1924–1935)	collar insignia (1935–1940)	collar insignia (1941–1943)	Technical troops (1943–1946)	Ground combat troops (1943–1955)	Ground forces (1955–1963)	Air force, airborne forces, air defence forces (1955–1963)	Navy (1924–1940)	Navy (1955–1963)	Air force, airborne forces (1963–1994)

==== Insignia in the Russian Federation ====
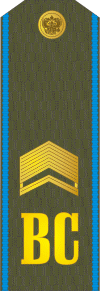
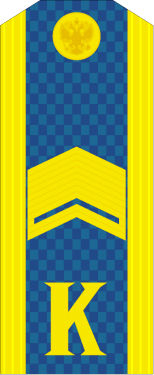
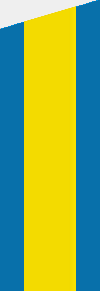
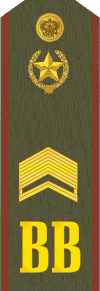
Russian Federation
Strategic Missile Troops, Airborne Forces (service dress) (1994–2010)	Ground Forces (service dress) (1994–2010)	Navy (dress uniform) (1994–2010)	Air Force and Airborne Forces kursant ("cadet") with rank of Starshina (dress uniform) (1994–2011)	Field dress (1994–2010)	Air force, airborne forces (2011–2015)	Internal troops (1995–2016); Ministry of Emergency Situations (firefighters) (1995–2001)	Militsiya, police, some internal troops	Navy (dress uniform) (after 2010)

== Insignia ==
Старшына
Staršyna
(Belarusian Ground Forces)

Старшина
Starshyna
(Bulgarian Land Forces)

Старшина
Starşina
(Kyrgyz Army)

Старшина́
Starshyná
(Russian Ground Forces)

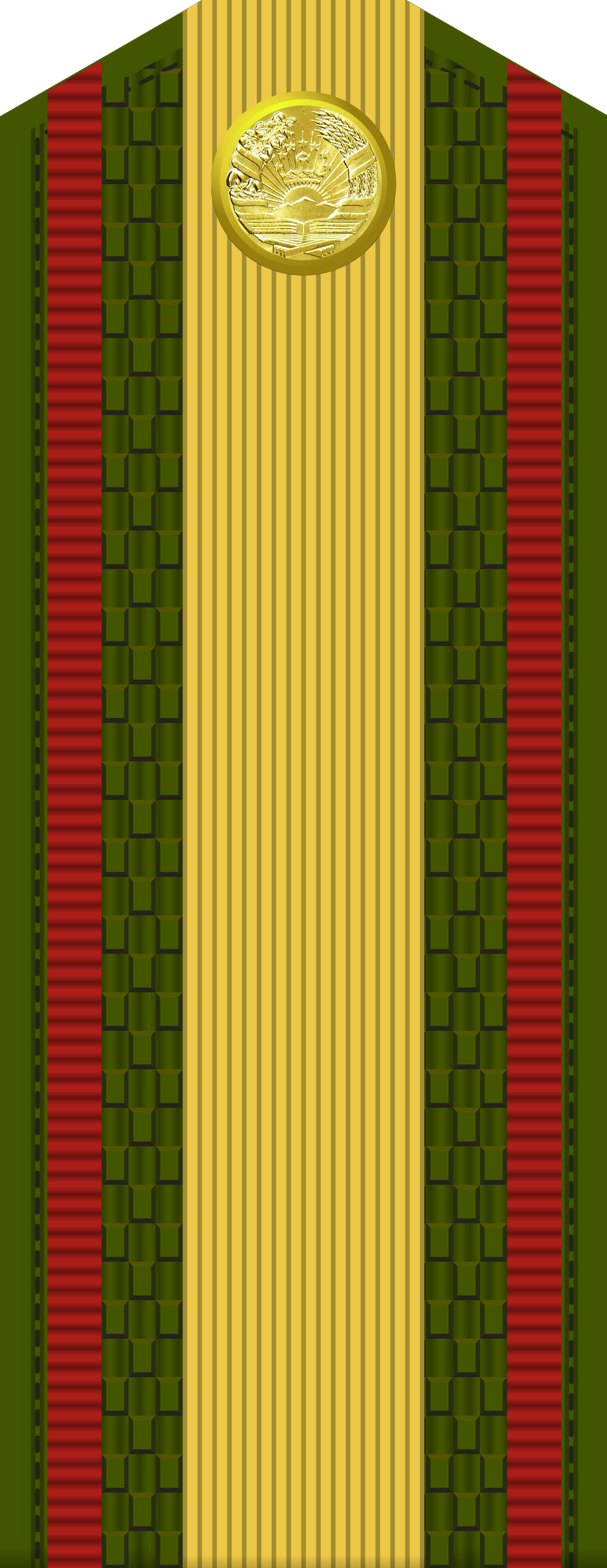
Старшина
Starshyna
(Tajik Ground Forces)

Starşina
(Turkmen Ground Forces)

=== Language variants ===
In some former communist state, the rank of "older" is used with the local language variants.

ԱՎԱԳ
Avag
(Armenian Ground Forces)

Aхлагч
Akhlagch
(Mongolian Ground Force)

== Naval variants ==
- Glavny starshina of the ship
- Glavny starshina
- Starshina 1st stage
- Starshina 2nd stage
