= Praporshchik =

Military rank used in Russia and other nations

Praporshchik (Russian: прапорщик, IPA: [ˈprapərɕːɪk], lit. 'ensign') is a rank used by the Russian Armed Forces and a number of former communist states. The rank is a non-commissioned officer's and is equivalent to michman in the corresponding navies. It is usually equivalent to warrant officer class 1 or sergeant major in English-speaking armies. Within NATO forces, the rank is rated as OR-7 or OR-8.

== Russia ==
Praporshchik is a rank in the Russian military, also used in other uniformed services of the Russian government such as the police. It was a junior officer rank in Imperial Russia, but was abolished following the Russian Revolution. In 1940, the rank was restored as a separate career group between non-commissioned officers and officers.

=== Imperial Russia ===
Praporshchik Пра́порщик
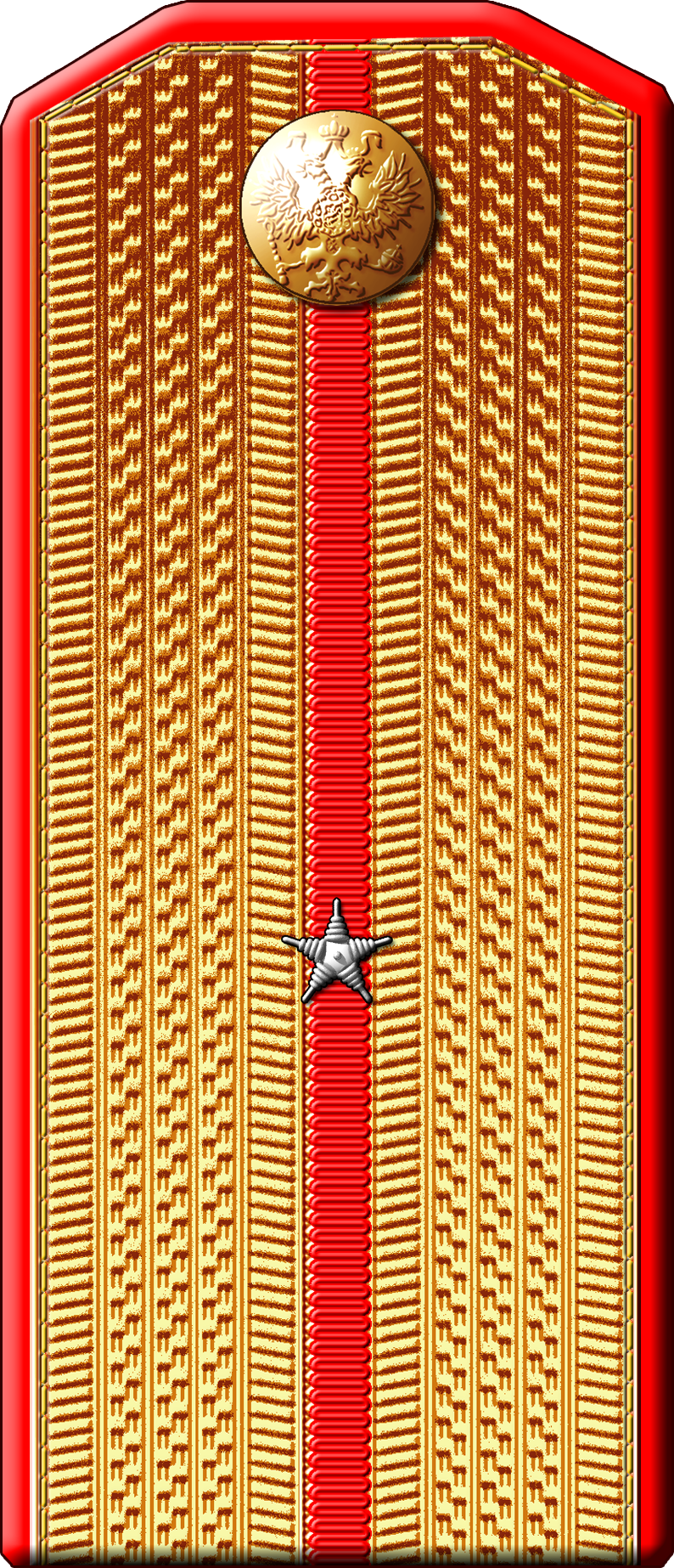
- Shoulder insignia c. 1900
- Country: Russian Empire
- Service branch: Imperial Russian Army
- Rank group: Junior officer
- Formation: 1649
- Abolished: 1917
- Next higher rank: Podporuchik
- Next lower rank: Zauryad-praporshchik
- Equivalent ranks: Michman

Praporshchik was originally an Oberoffizer rank, as first introduced in Streltsy New Regiments. The name originates from Slavonic prapor (прапор), meaning flag; the praporshchik was a flag-bearer in Kievan Rus troops. In the New Regiments of the Streltsy and the "new army" of Peter the Great, praporshchik was ranked as a commissioned officer of the lowest grade; this was legalised by the Table of Ranks of 1722, as class XII/XIII in the Imperial Russian Army, and equivalent to Michman of the Imperial Russian Navy and classified as junior officer rank.

By the 19th century, the rank was given to senior non-commissioned officers of the Russian army upon their retirement, and also to reserve or volunteer officers with no previous service. From then on, commissioned officers started service as Podporuchik.

In spite of this, podpraporshchik ("sub-ensign") was one of the non-commissioned officer (NCO) grades, originally below sergeant and Feldwebel. From 1826 to 1884 it became the highest non-commissioned rank of the infantry, cavalry and the Leib Guard. From 1884 podpraporshchik ranked below the newly introduced NCO grade zauryad praporshchik ("deputy ensign").

The rank was abolished in 1917 by the Bolsheviks. In the White Army, the rank was redundant, although newly enrolled bearers of this rank could have it for a few month before being promoted to podporuchik; by 1919, the rank was no longer in use.

=== Soviet Army and Militia ===
In the Soviet Army, the reintroduction of the praporshchik rank in 1972, along with the michman rank in the Soviet Navy, marked the attempt to recreate a corps of contract non-commissioned officers similar to master sergeants and chief petty officers, the role that was previously reserved for senior drafted personnel. Contrary to Western practice of assigning the senior sergeant ranks to veteran soldiers, the Soviet ranks of starshina and sergeant were routinely assigned to 20-year-old soldiers at the end of their 2-year draft. The praporshchiks were aged volunteers and were expected to have more authority over draftsmen than similarly aged sergeants; they are placed in a separate category of "master non-commissioned officers" (praporshchik and michman).

See further commentary on the rank at Carey Schofield, Inside the Soviet Army, Headline Book Publishing, 1991, where long-service praporshchiks' scrounging and repair skills were celebrated.

Shoulder boards USSR and Russian Federation (1971−1994)
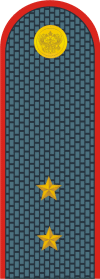
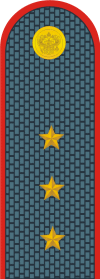
	Mechanized infantry, shoulder board army (general) land forces (general)		Technical troops, engineers, armour, artillery, missile troops (including: MT ground forces SMT, Air defence MT), Vehicle transport troops, construction troops		Air Force; Naval aviation Airborne forces		FSIN; MES Russia; Militia (until 2011); Police (from 2011)
	Everyday uniform						Everyday uniform
from 1971 from 1991
	Praporshchik (1971–1994)	Starshy praporshchik (1981–1994)	Praporshchik (1971–1994)	Starshy praporshchik (1981–1994)	Praporshchik (1971–1994)	Starshy praporshchik (1981–1994)	Praporshchik	Starshy praporshchik

Sleeve insignia

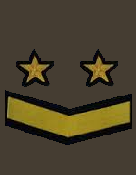
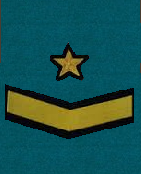
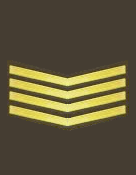
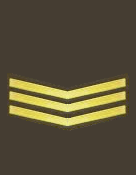
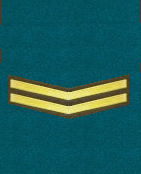
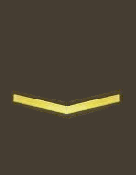
	Badge to indicate the seniority Praporshchik (from 1971)/ Starshy praporshchik (from 1981) (on left-hand sleeve to the full dress uniform, everyday tunic and overcoat)
sleeve badge
	10 and more years	5th to 9th year	4th year (equivalent with 5-9 year, however without star)	3rd year	2nd year	1st year

Carey Schofield's Inside the Soviet Army c. 1990 provides a good description of the place of the praporshchik within the Soviet military system.

=== Praporshchik rank of the Russian Federation ===
Praporshchik Пра́порщик
- Shoulder insignia for the Army and Air Force
- Country: Russia
- Service branch: Russian Ground Forces; Russian Aerospace Forces; Russian Police
- Rank group: Non-commissioned officer
- Formation: 1940
- Next higher rank: Starshy praporshchik
- Next lower rank: Starshina
- Equivalent ranks: Michman

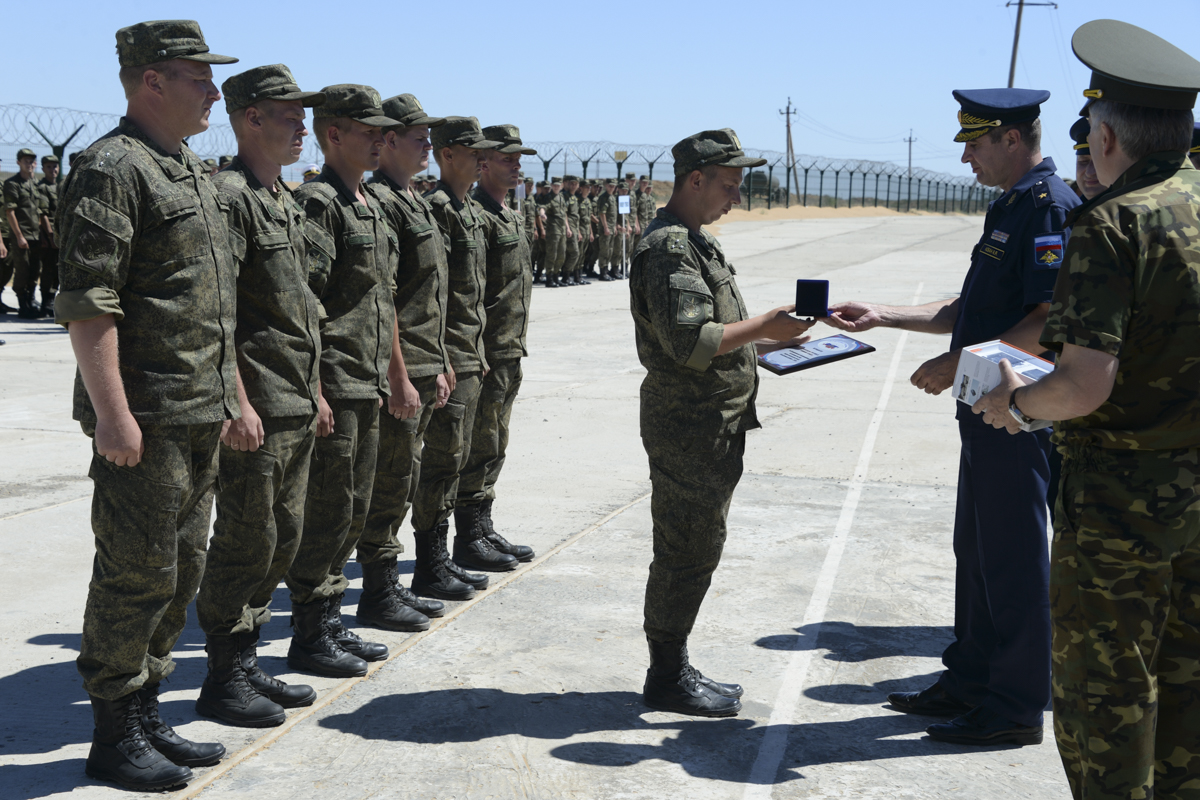
Russian Air Force Praporshchiks

The Praporshchik rank continues to be used in the armies of ex-Soviet states.

Modern Russian praporshchiks and michmans represent a separate category of military personnel. According to their official position, duties and rights, they occupy a position close to junior officers, being the officers' closest assistants, as well as supervisors for the soldiers (sailors) and sergeants (petty officers) of their units.

Since the beginning of 2009, a phased liquidation of the institution of praporshchiks and michmans started in the Russian Armed Forces. It was assumed that the praporshchiks would be replaced by professional contract sergeants, the federal target program for the training of which has already been approved.

"The institute of praporshchiks, which numbered 142 thousand people, has been liquidated in the army," General of the Army Nikolai Makarov, Chief of the General Staff of the Russian Armed Forces, assured. "We had 142 thousand praporshchiks. As of 1 December 2009, not a single one was left". Approximately 20 thousand praporshchiks who were in command positions were appointed, the rest were discharged from service or transferred to NCO positions.

According to the assumption, since January–March December 2010 no new praporshchiks or senior praporshchiks were appointed, but the service members who had these ranks were allowed to serve out the remainder of their contracts, retaining their ranks and rank insignia.

At the same time, the abolition of the institute of praporshchiks did not affect the Internal Troops of the Ministry of Internal Affairs, the Border Service, the FSB, the FSO, the Ministry of Emergency Situations and other military formations other than the Ministry of Defense; in addition, there is a special rank of praporshchik in law enforcement agencies.

On 27 February 2013, at an expanded collegium of the Ministry of Defense, the Minister of Defense Sergei Shoigu announced the return of the institute of praporshchiks and michmans to the Russian Armed Forces.

The Ministry of Defense introduced a new staffing table on 1 July 2013, in which, for the first time in five years, special positions for praporshchiks and michmans appeared. According to Colonel-General Viktor Goremykin, head of the Main Personnel Directorate (GUK) of the Ministry of Defense, about 100 positions have been allocated for praporshchiks and michmans, including only combat ones - "no warehouses, no bases" was the main requirement of the Minister of Defense. These positions are generally subdivided into command (service platoon commander, commander of a combat group, combat vehicle, combat post) and technical (company technician, head of a radio station, electrician, paramedic, head of a repair shop, head of a technical unit, etc.). From 1 December 2008 these were considered NCO positions. State Secretary of the Ministry of Defense Nikolay Pankov said that the positions of praporshchiks and michmans require special education, but not at the level required of the commissioned officers.

Shoulder boards Russian Federation (1994–present)
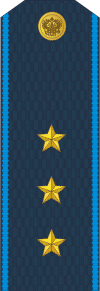
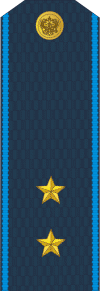
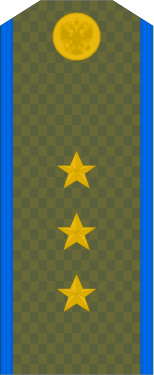
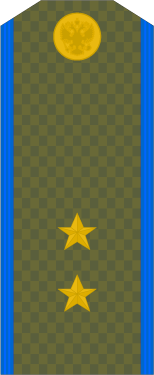
1994–2010	Ground Forces (Army)		Air Force		Airborne Troops		Field uniform
	Starshy praporshchik	Praporshchik	Starshy praporshchik	Praporshchik	Starshy praporshchik	Praporshchik	Starshy praporshchik	Praporshchik
from 2010	Ground forces (Army)		Air Force		Airborne troops		Field uniform
	Starshy praporshchik	Praporshchik	Starshy praporshchik	Praporshchik	Starshy praporshchik	Praporshchik	Starshy praporshchik	Praporshchik

== Insignia ==
=== Army ===
ԵՆԹԱՍՊԱ
Yent’aspa
(Armenian Ground Forces)

Gizir
(Azerbaijani Land Forces)

Прапаршчык
Praparščyk
(Belarusian Ground Forces)

Praporčík
(Czech Land Forces)

Прапорщик
Praporsçik
(Kyrgyz Army)

Пра́порщик
Práporshchik
(Russian Ground Forces)

Praporščak
(Slovenian Ground Force)

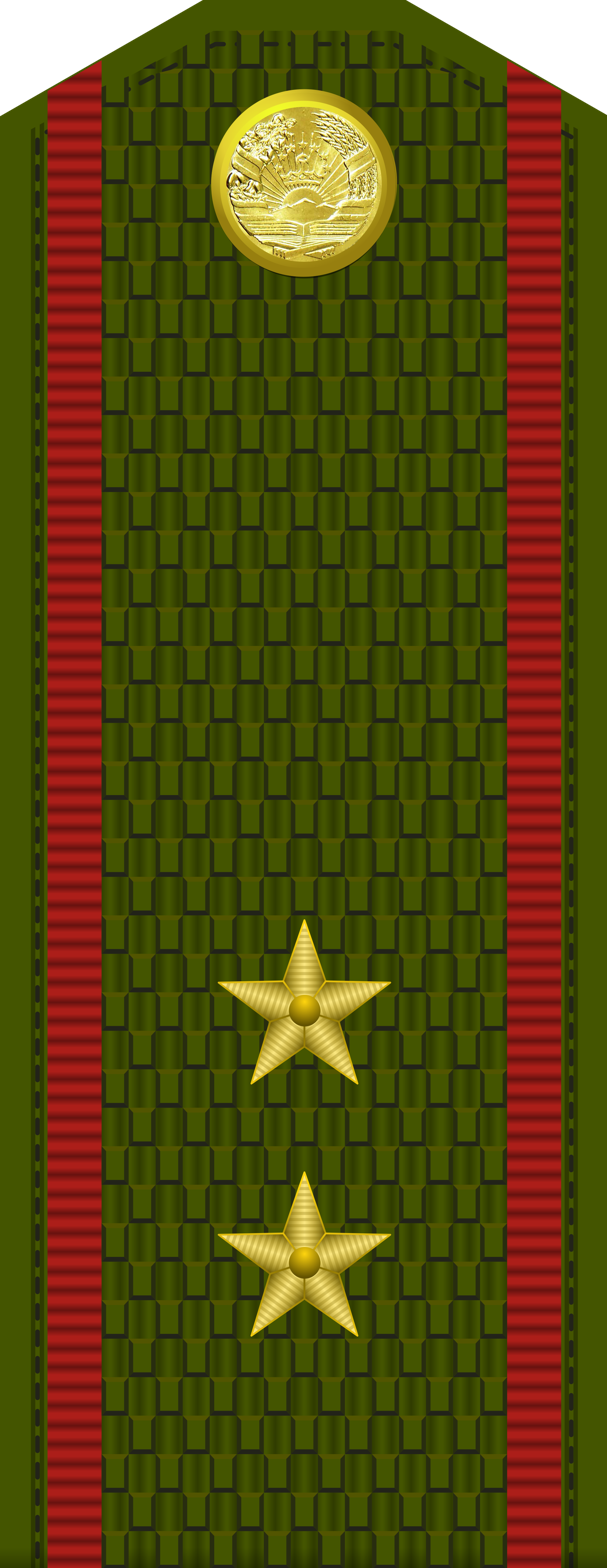
Прапоршик
Praporshik
(Tajik Ground Forces)

== See also ==
- History of Russian military ranks
- Ranks and rank insignia of the Imperial Russian Army until 1917
- Ranks and rank insignia of the Russian Federation's armed forces 1994–2010
- Ranks and rank insignia of the Soviet Army 1955–1991
