= LXI Corps =

LXI Corps or 61st Corps may refer to:

- 61st Corps (German Empire)
- LXI Reserve Corps, Wehrmacht, Germany
- 61st Guards Fighter Aviation Corps, Soviet Union
- 61st Rifle Corps, Soviet Union
- 61st (Glasgow, 2nd Highland) Lanarkshire Rifle Volunteer Corps, United Kingdom
- 61st (Chorley) Lancashire Rifle Volunteer Corps, United Kingdom

== See also ==
- List of military corps by number
- 61st Brigade (disambiguation)
- 61st Division (disambiguation)
- 61st Regiment (disambiguation)
- 61st Squadron (disambiguation)
- 61st (disambiguation)
