= 61st Cavalry =

61st Cavalry may refer to:

== Divisions ==
- 61st Cavalry Division (United States)
- 61st Cavalry Division (Soviet Union)

== Regiments ==
- 61st Cavalry (India)
- 61st Cavalry Regiment (United States)

== Companies ==
- 61st (South Irish Horse (Dublin)) Company, Imperial Yeomanry

== See also ==
- 61st Division (disambiguation)
- 61st Brigade (disambiguation)
- 61st Regiment (disambiguation)
- 61st (disambiguation)
