= 611 (disambiguation) =

611 or variation may refer to:

== In general ==
- 611 (number), a number in the 600s range

=== Time ===
- 611 AD, a year in the Common Era
- 611 BC, a year Before the Common Era

== Places ==
- Route 611, see List of highways numbered 611
- 611 Place, a skyscraper in Los Angeles, California, USA
- 611 Valeria, an asteroid in the Solar System, the 611th asteroid registered

== Transportation ==
- Flight 611 (disambiguation)
- Project 611, a Soviet submarine class
- London Buses route 611, London, England, UK

=== Rail ===
- Caledonian Railway 611 class, a saddle-tank steam locomotive class
- CIE 611 Class, a German locomotive train class
- DB Class 611, a diesel multiple unit train class
- JŽ series 611, a diesel multiple unit train class
- Norfolk and Western 611, preserved American steam locomotive

== Other uses ==
- 6-1-1, an N-1-1 number in North America
- 611 socket, a modular phone jack in Australia

== See also ==
- 61 (disambiguation)
