= 61st =

61st is the ordinal form of the number 61st. 61st or Sixty-first may also refer to:

- A fraction, 1/61, equal to one of 61 equal parts

== Geography ==
- 61st meridian east, a line of longitude
- 61st meridian west, a line of longitude
- 61st parallel north, a circle of latitude
- 61st parallel south, a circle of latitude
- 61st Street (disambiguation)

== Military ==
- 61st Army
- 61st Brigade (disambiguation)
- 61st Division (disambiguation)
- 61st Regiment (disambiguation)
- 61st Squadron (disambiguation)

== Other ==
- 61st century
- 61st century BC

== See also ==
- 61 (disambiguation)
