= 61st Infantry Regiment =

61st Infantry Regiment can refer to several military units:

Infantry regiments

- 61st Infantry Regiment (United States) - (Second World War)
- 61st Infantry Regiment (Finland) - (Second World War)
- 61st (South Gloucestershire) Regiment of Foot - A British regiment that existed from 1758 to 1881

== See also ==
- 61st Regiment (disambiguation), including American Civil War regiments
