= Podpraporshchik =

Podpraporshchik in Russia
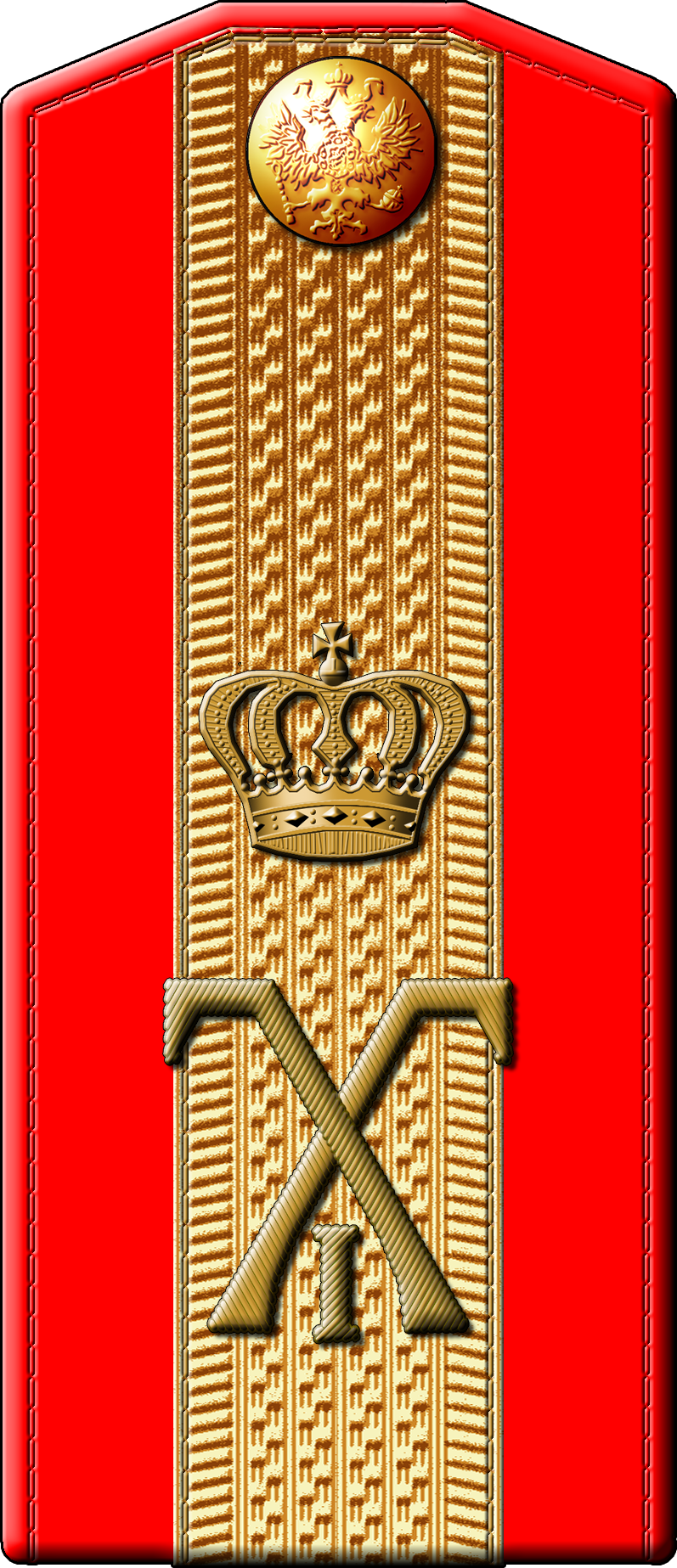
- Utilization: 1826–1917
- Rank group: Unter-ofitsery
- Army: Podpraporshchik
- Navy: Starshy bootsmann
- Cossacks: Podkhorunzhiy (ru: подхорунжий)
- NATO equivalent: OR-7

Podpraporshchik (Russian: подпра́порщик, lit. ''under-praporshchik' or 'sub-ensign'', Russian pronunciation: [pɐtˈprapərɕːɪk]) was a Russian non-commissioned officer (NCO) rank (Russian: у̀нтер-офице́р ранг, IPA: [ˌunʲtʲɪr ɐfʲɪˈtsɛr rank]), originally below the Sergeant and Feldwebel. From 1826 to 1884 it became the highest NCO rank of the infantry, cavalry, and Leib Guard. From 1884, podpraporshchik ranked below the newly introduced NCO-grade zauryad-praporshchik (Russian: зауря̀д-пра́порщик, lit. 'praposhchik deputy', Russian pronunciation: [zəʊˈrʲat ˈprapərɕːɪk]).

Sequence of ranks
| junior rank: Feldwebel (Wachtmeister) | Podpraposhchik | senior rank: Zauryad-praporshchik (1909-1917) |

== Branch of service, rank and rank insignia ==
The colour of the material identified the particular unit
Non-commissioned officers
| Branch of service | Infantry | Artillery | Cavalry | Cossack troops |
|---|---|---|---|---|
| Rank insignia | | | | |
| Rank designation | Podpraporshchik | | Estandart-yunker (Shtandart-yunker) | Podkhorunzhi |

See also

- History of Russian military ranks
- Ranks and rank insignia of the Imperial Russian Army until 1917

See also

- History of Russian military ranks
- Ranks and rank insignia of the Imperial Russian Army until 1917
