= Zauryad-praporshchik =

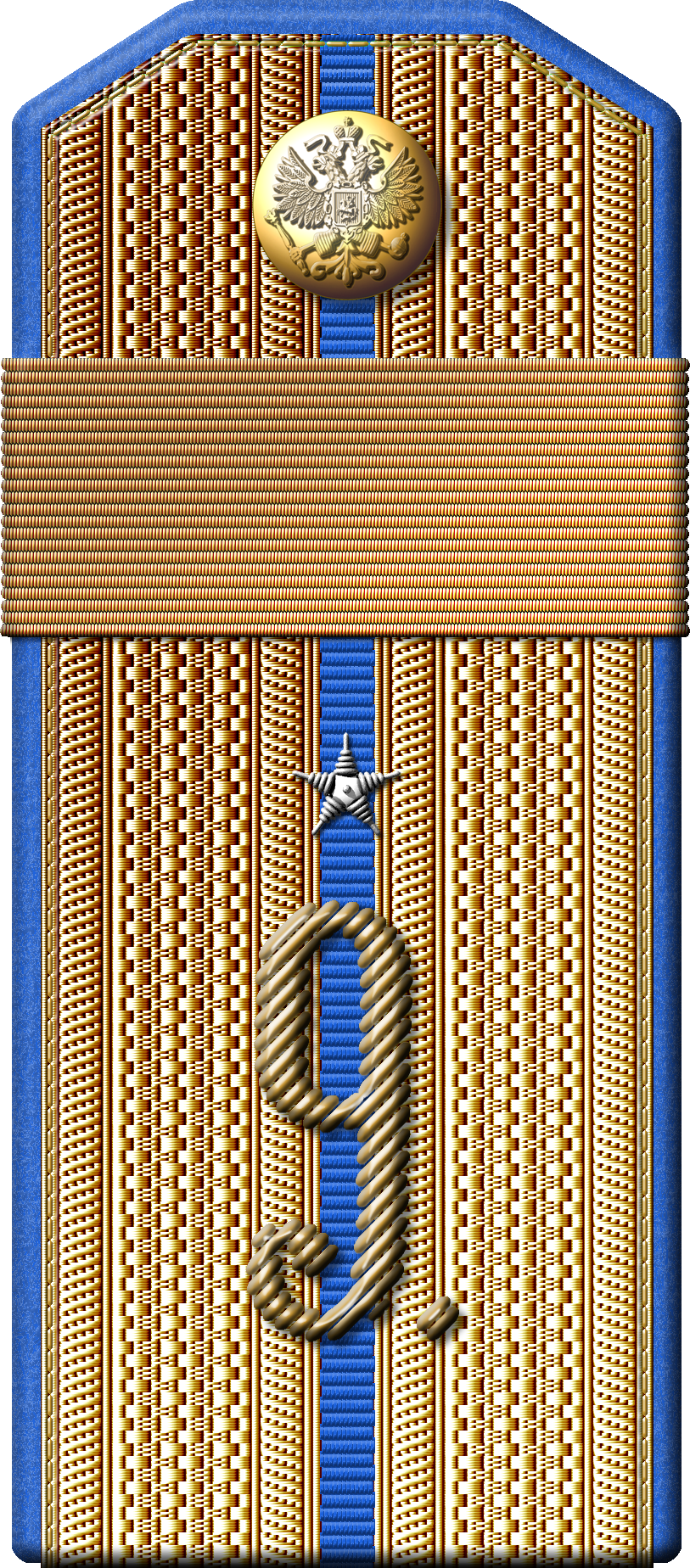
- Rank insignia: Russian Imperial Army
- Introduction: 1907
- Rank group: Unter-ofitsery
- Army: Zauryad-praporshchik
- Navy: Starshy bootsmann
- lower: Podpraporshchik, OR7
- higher: Praporshchik, OF1 (lower level)
- NATO equivalent: OR-8

Zauryad-praporshchik (Russian: зауря̀д-пра́порщик, lit. 'praporshchik deputy', Russian pronunciation: [zəʊˈrʲat ˈprapərɕːɪk]) was the highest Russian non-commissioned officer (NCO) rank (Russian: у̀нтер-офице́р ранг, IPA: [ˌunʲtʲɪr ɐfʲɪˈtsɛr rank]) in the Imperial Army from 1909 until 1917. The utilization of this particular rank was limited to wartimes only.

Sequence of ranks
junior rank: Podpraporshchik	Zauryad-praposhchik	senior rank: Praporshchik

Rank insignia Zauryad-praporshchik

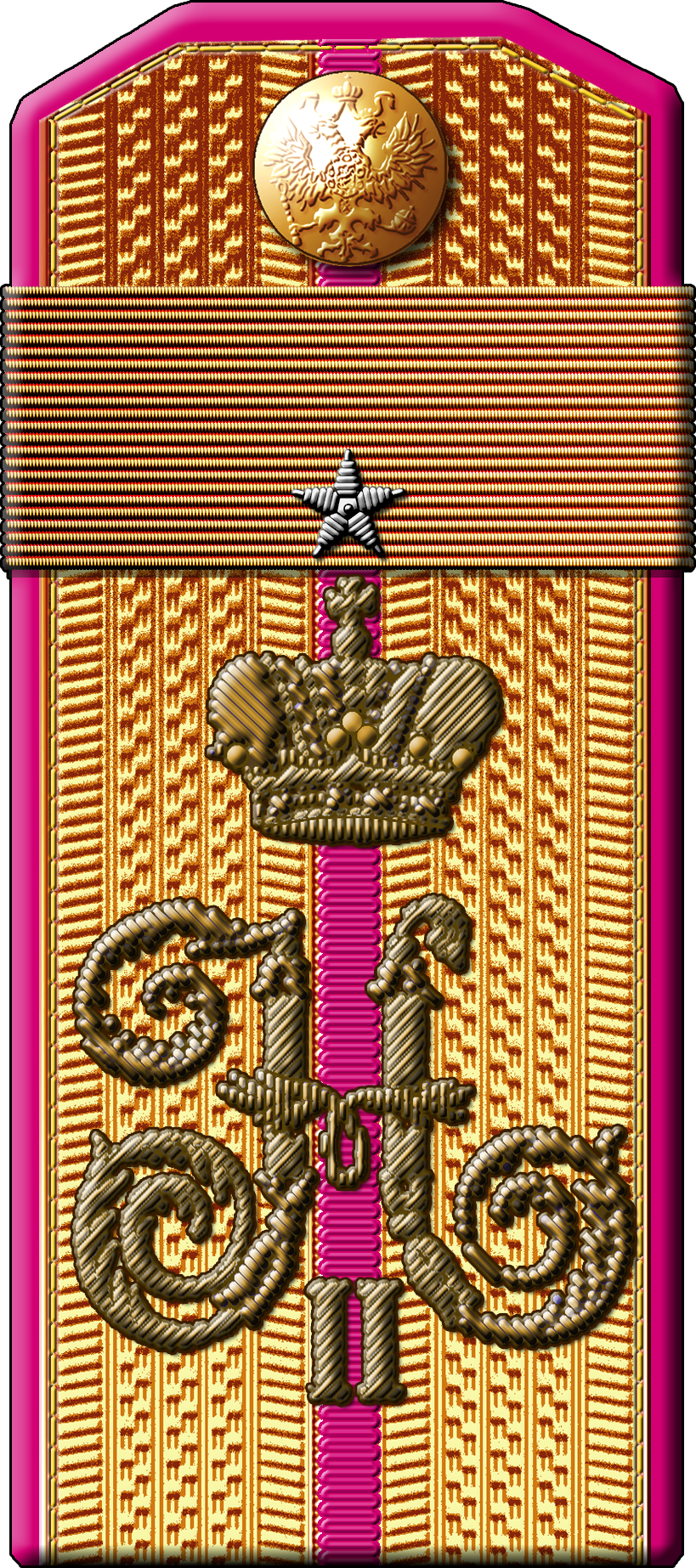
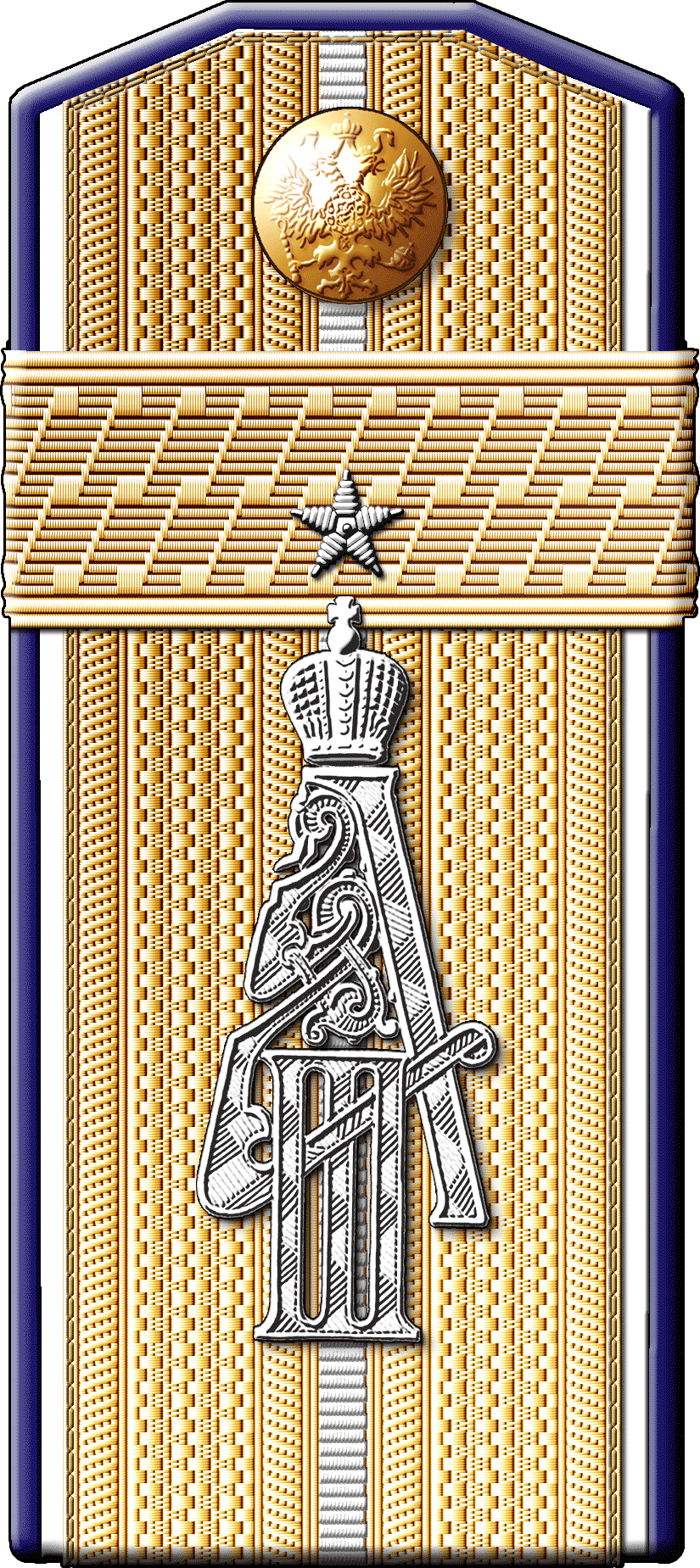
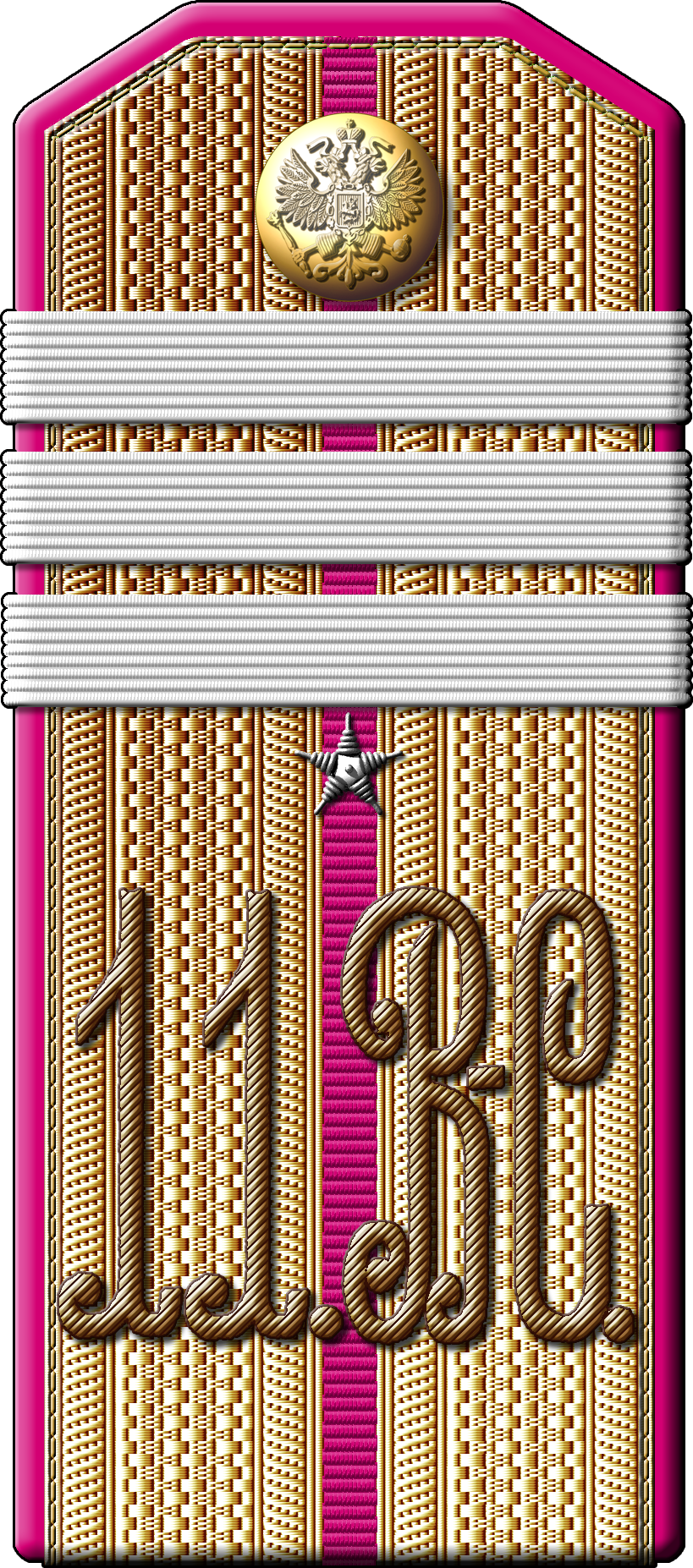
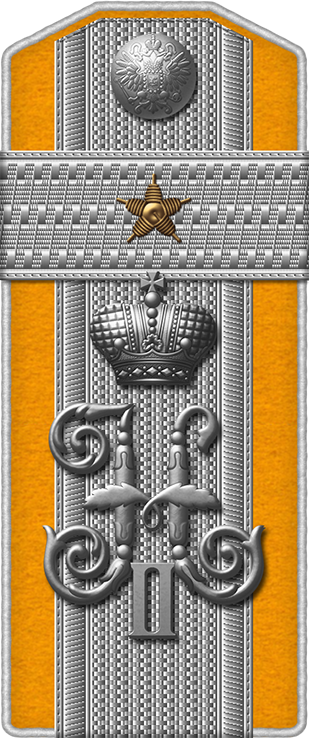
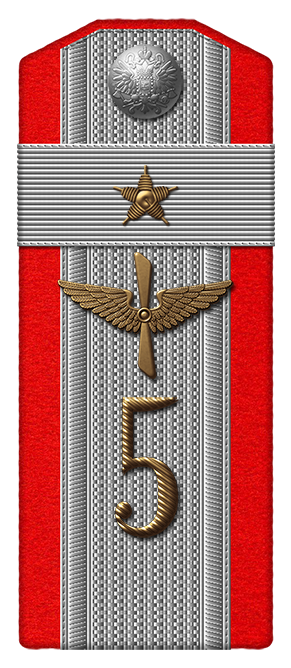
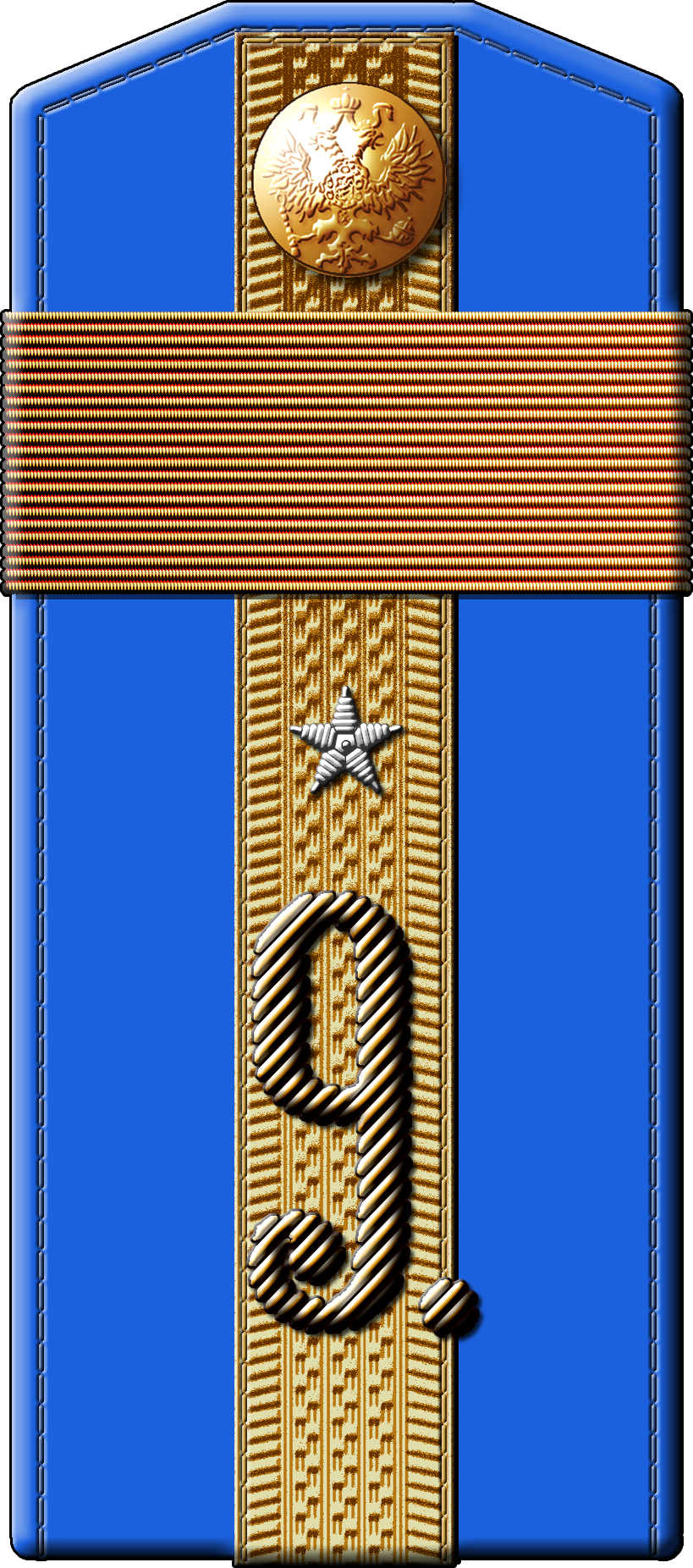
designation	shoulder boards 1904–1917
rank insignia
designation of the rank	... generated from Feldwebel OR6 ranks (1904–1912)	... generated from Wachtmeister OR6 ranks (1908–1912)	... generated from Senior Unteroffizier OR5 ranks (1904–1912)	... retired from service (reactivated to service) to assignment Wachtmeister OR6 (design 1907–1911; excepted, the rank was provided in Japanese-Russian war)	... retired from service (reactivated to service) to assignment Feldwebel OR6 (design 1907–1911; excepted, the rank was provided in Russo-Japanese War)	... generated from Feldwebel OR6 ranks (design 1907–1909)

See also

- History of Russian military ranks
- Ranks and rank insignia of the Imperial Russian Army until 1917

== Equivalent ==
Army (infantry, artillery, and cavalry)

- Zauryad-praporshchik (зауряд-прапорщик)

Navy

- Starshy bootsmann (cтарший боцман)

See also

- History of Russian military ranks
- Ranks and rank insignia of the Imperial Russian Army until 1917
