= 61st Infantry Division (Russian Empire) =

- 61-я пехотная дивизия
- Active: 1914–1918
- Country: Russian Empire
- Branch: Russian Imperial Army
- Role: Infantry

The 61st Infantry Division (Russian: 61-я пехотная дивизия, 61-ya Pekhotnaya Diviziya) was an infantry formation of the Russian Imperial Army.

== Organization ==
- 1st Brigade
  - 241st Infantry Regiment
  - 242nd Infantry Regiment
- 2nd Brigade
  - 243rd Infantry Regiment
  - 244th Infantry Regiment

== Rank insignia ==
=== Officer ranks ===
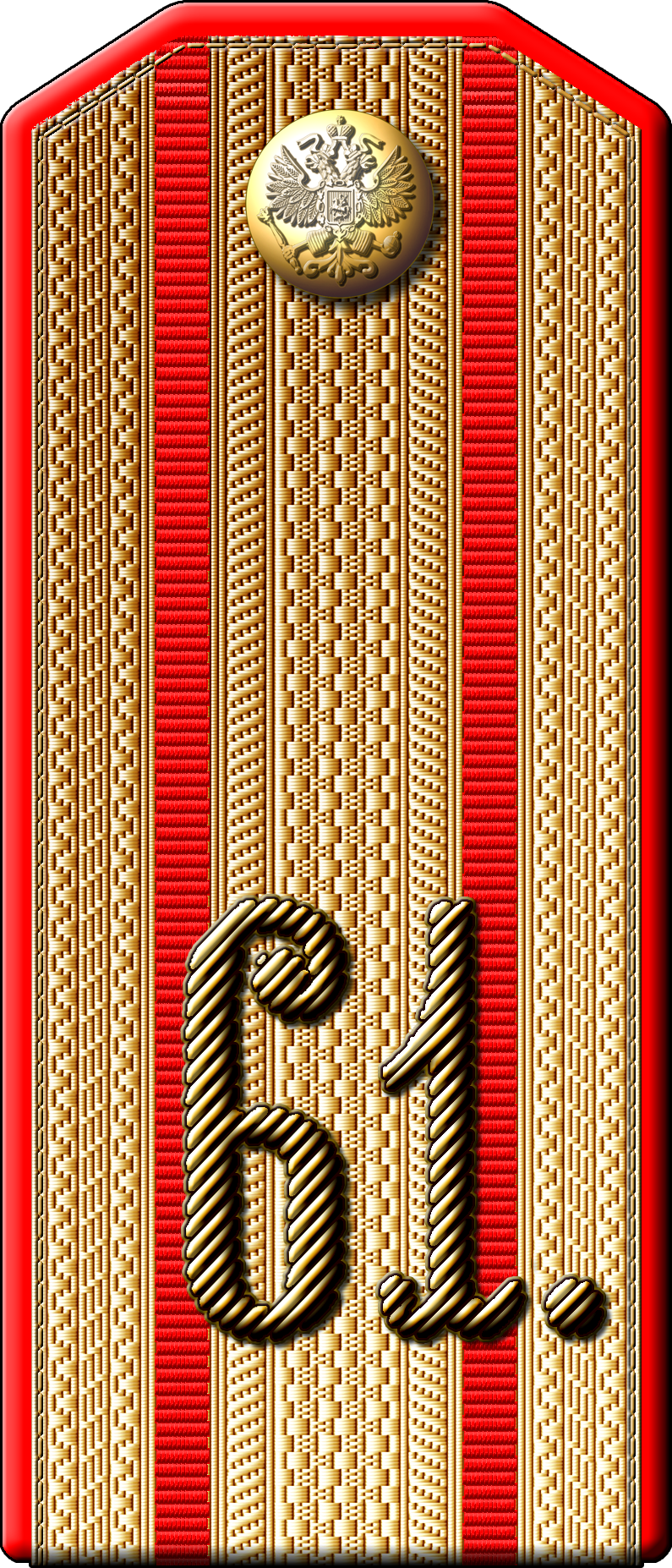
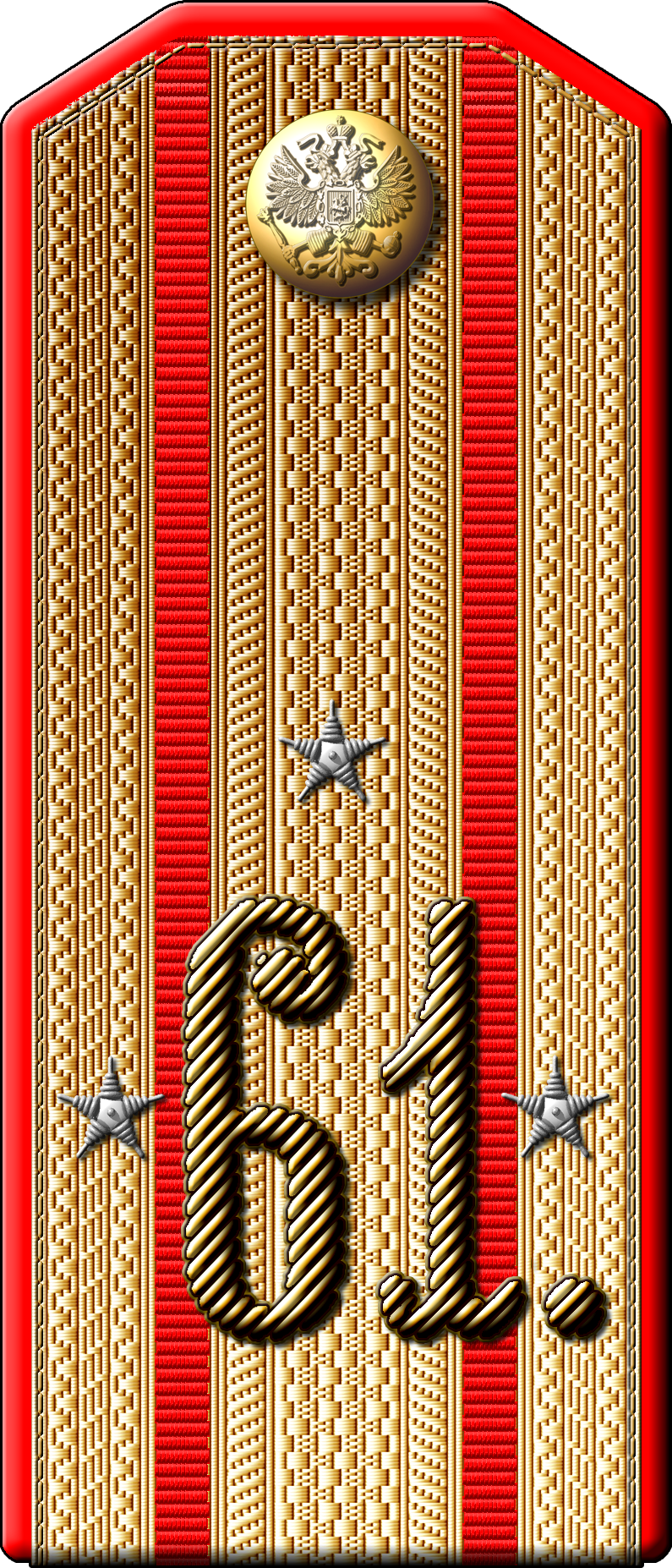
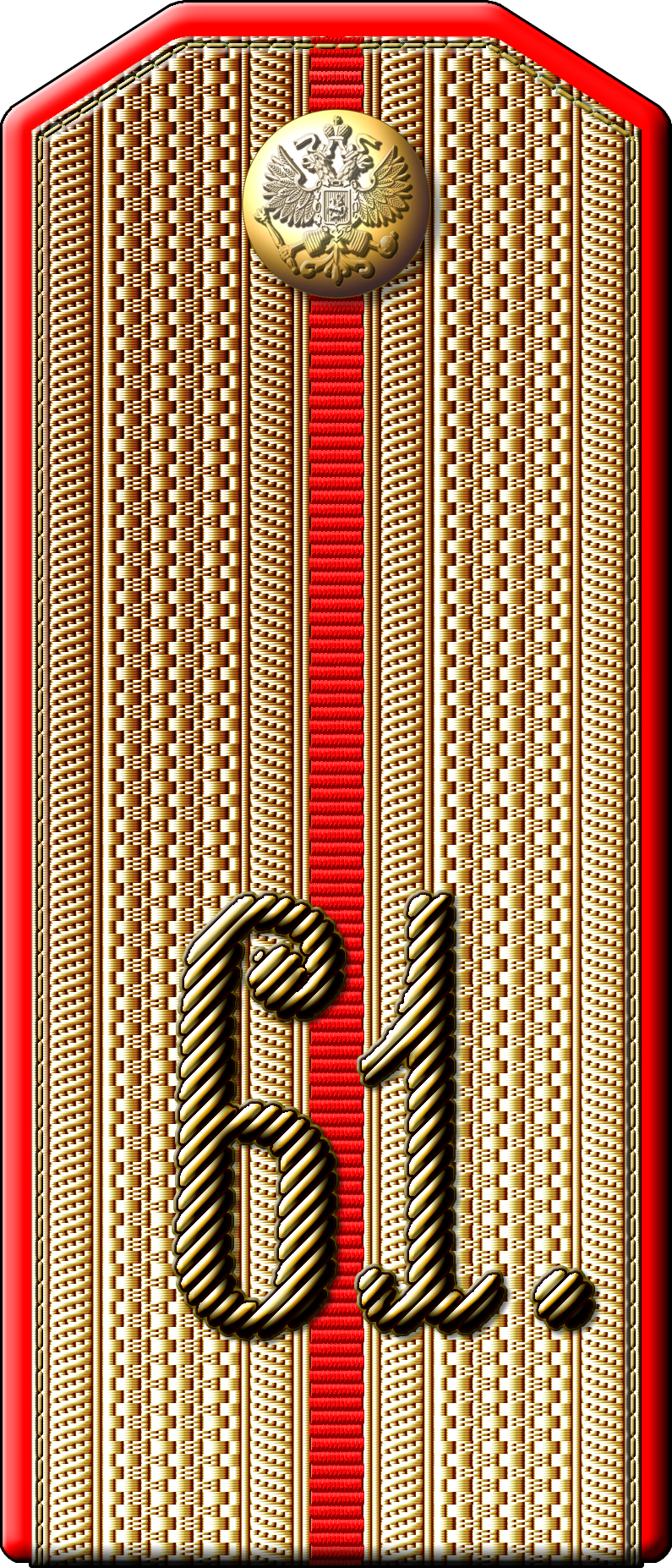
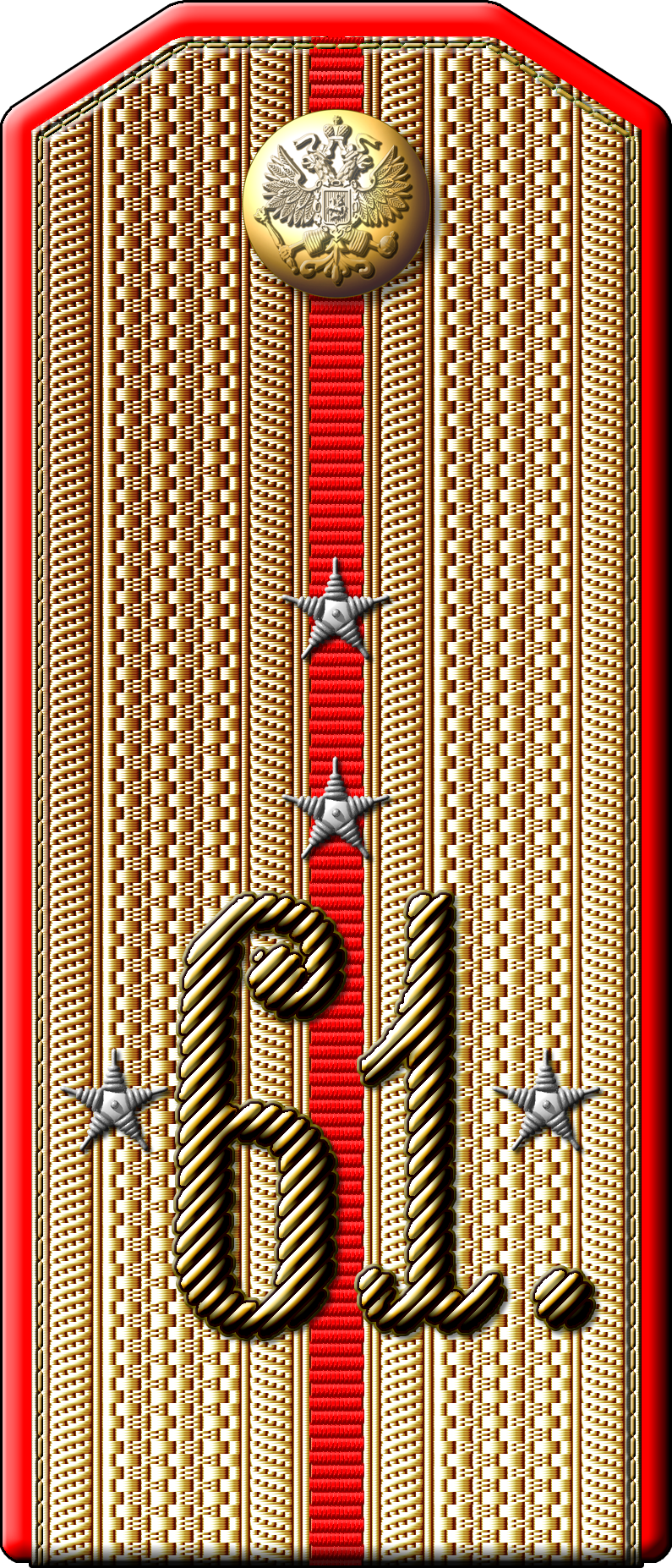
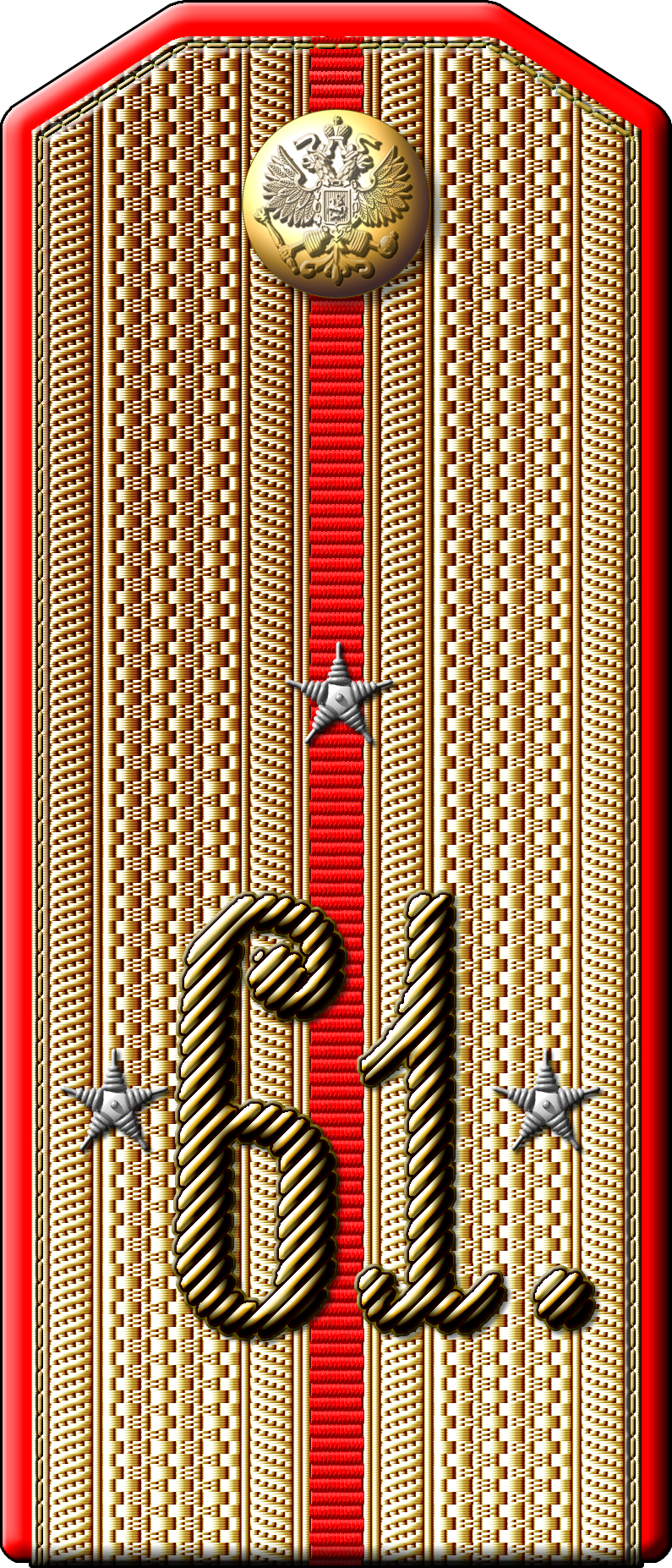
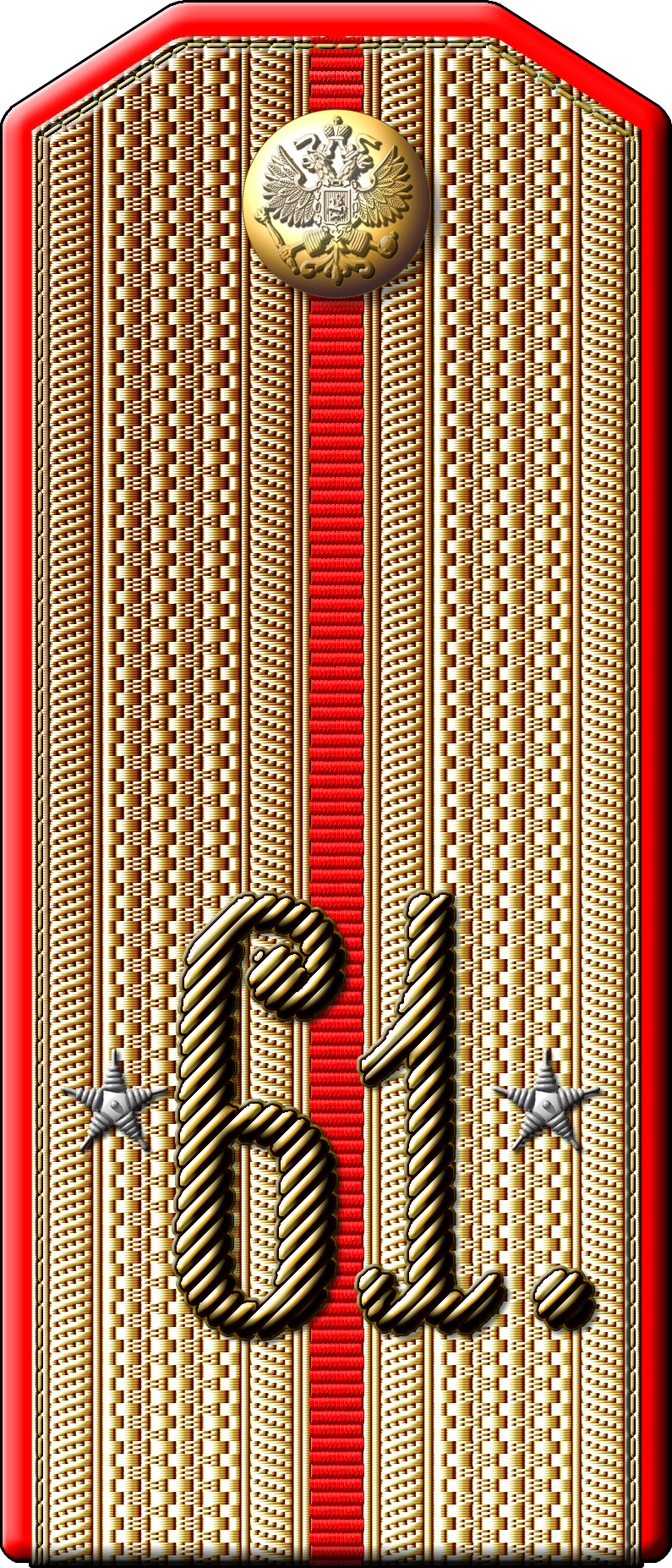
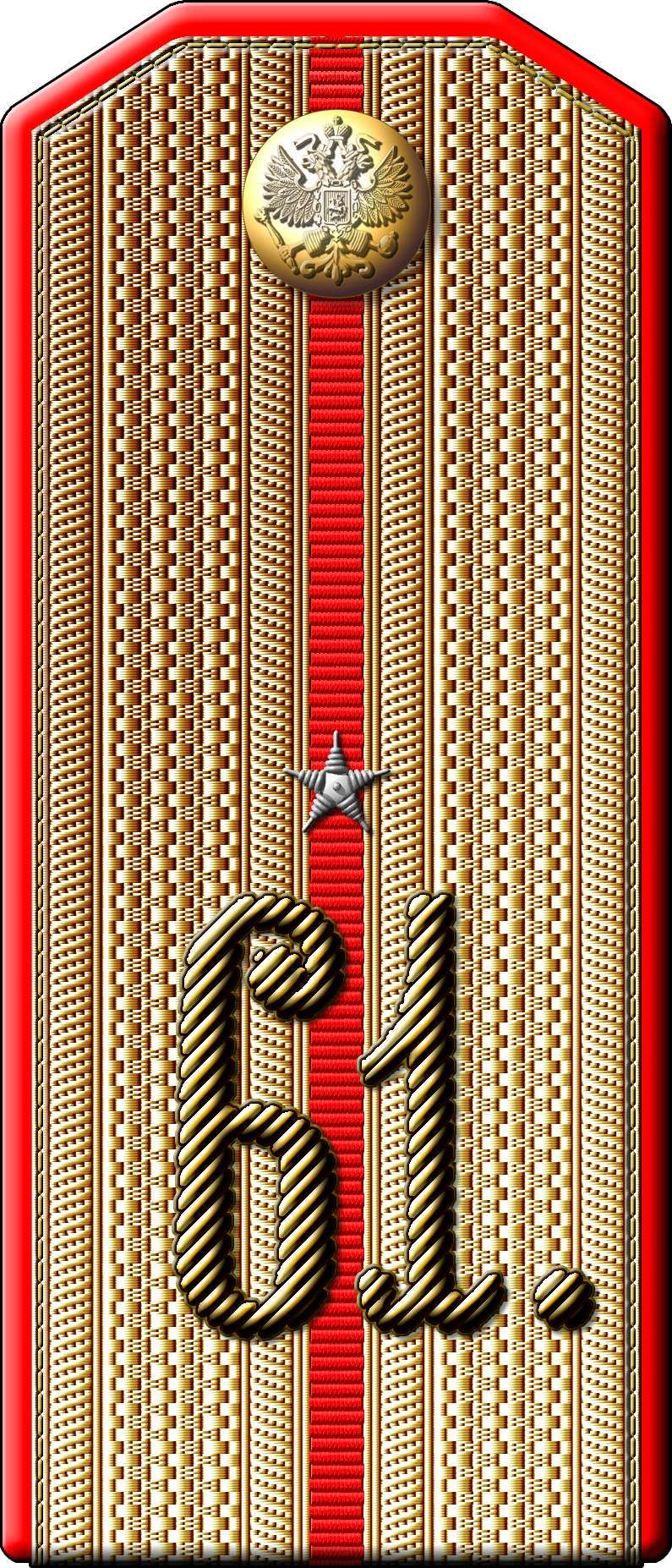
Description	Rank insignia as to the design 1904–1906
Shoulder straps
Rank designation	Polkovnik (en: colonel)	Podpolkovnik (lieutenant colonel)	Kapitan (en: captain)	Stabs-kapitan	Poruchik	Podporuchik	Praporshchik
Rrank group	Shtab-ofitsery (en: staff officers)			Ober-ofitsery (en: upper, superior, or higher officers)

=== Non-commissioned officers and enlisted ranks ===
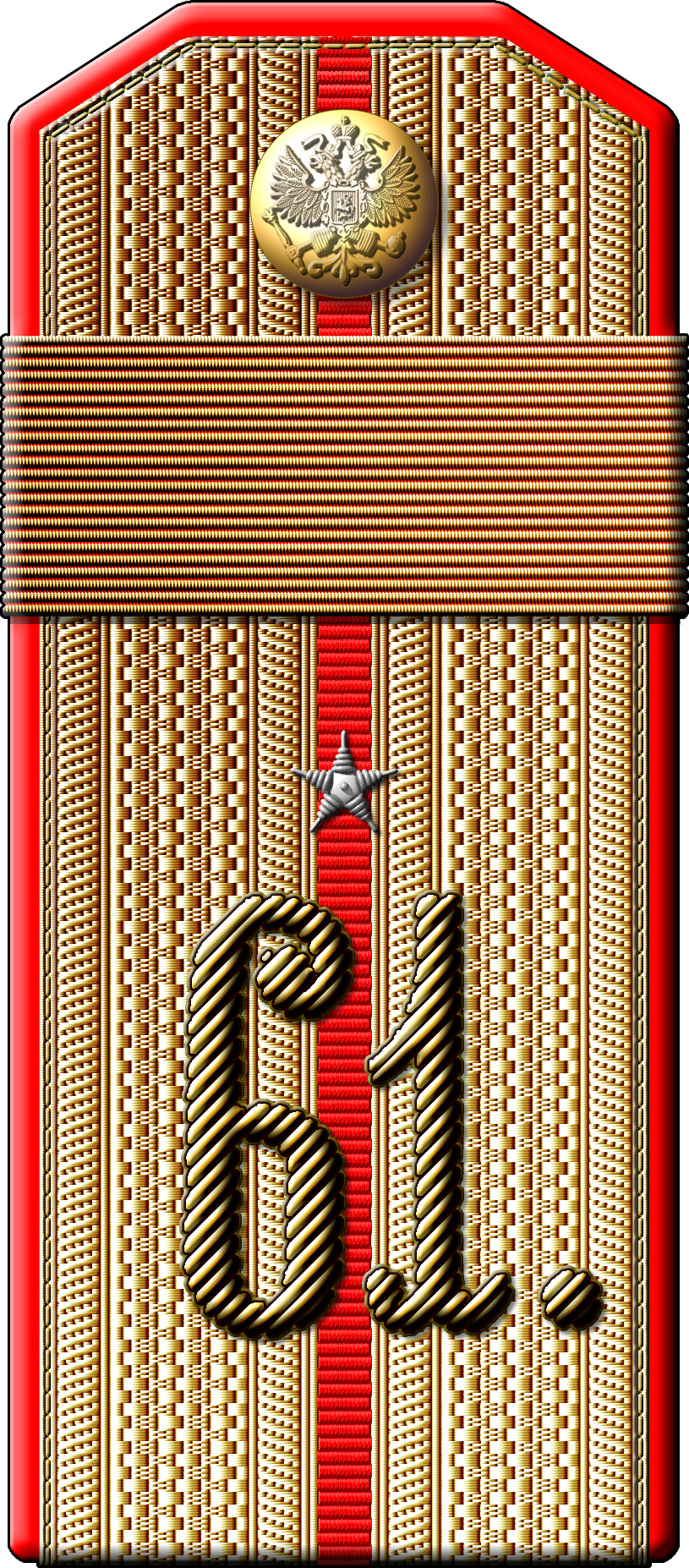
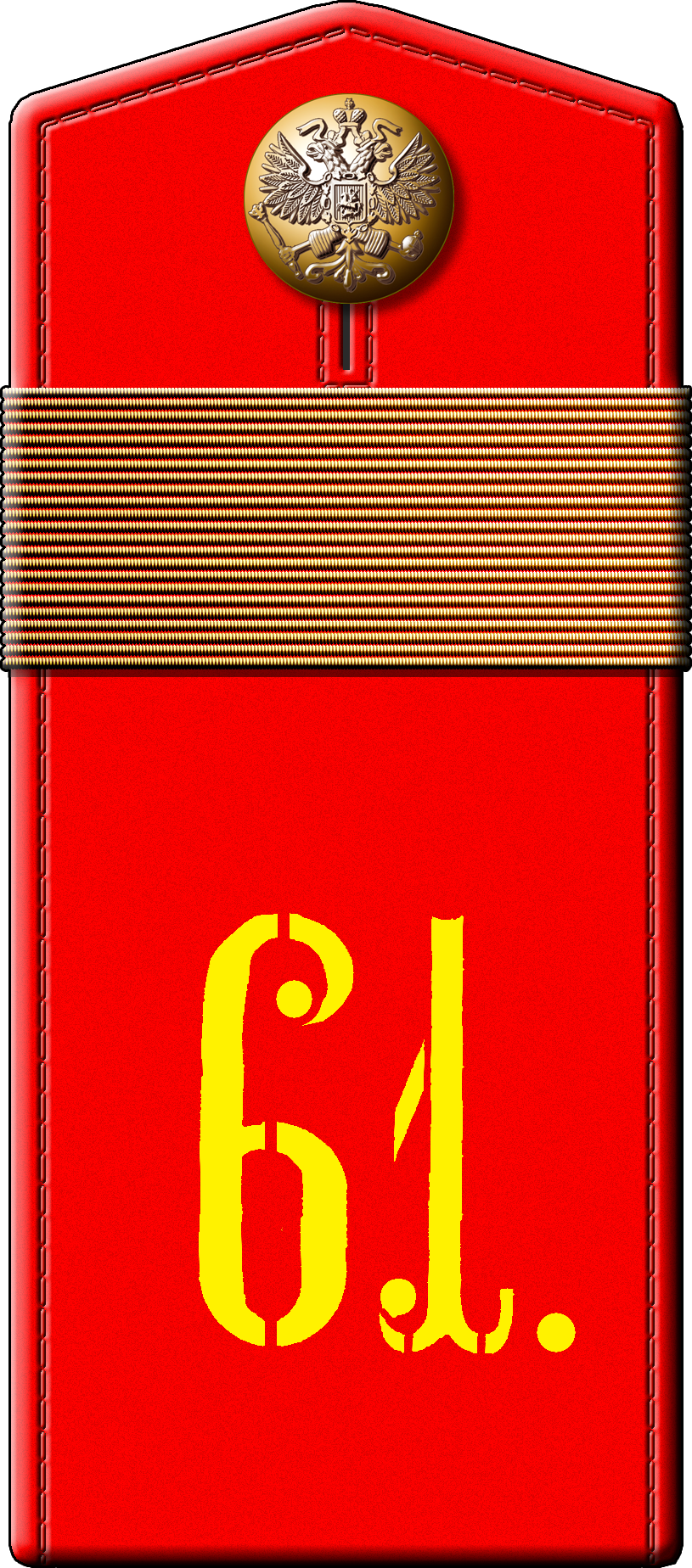
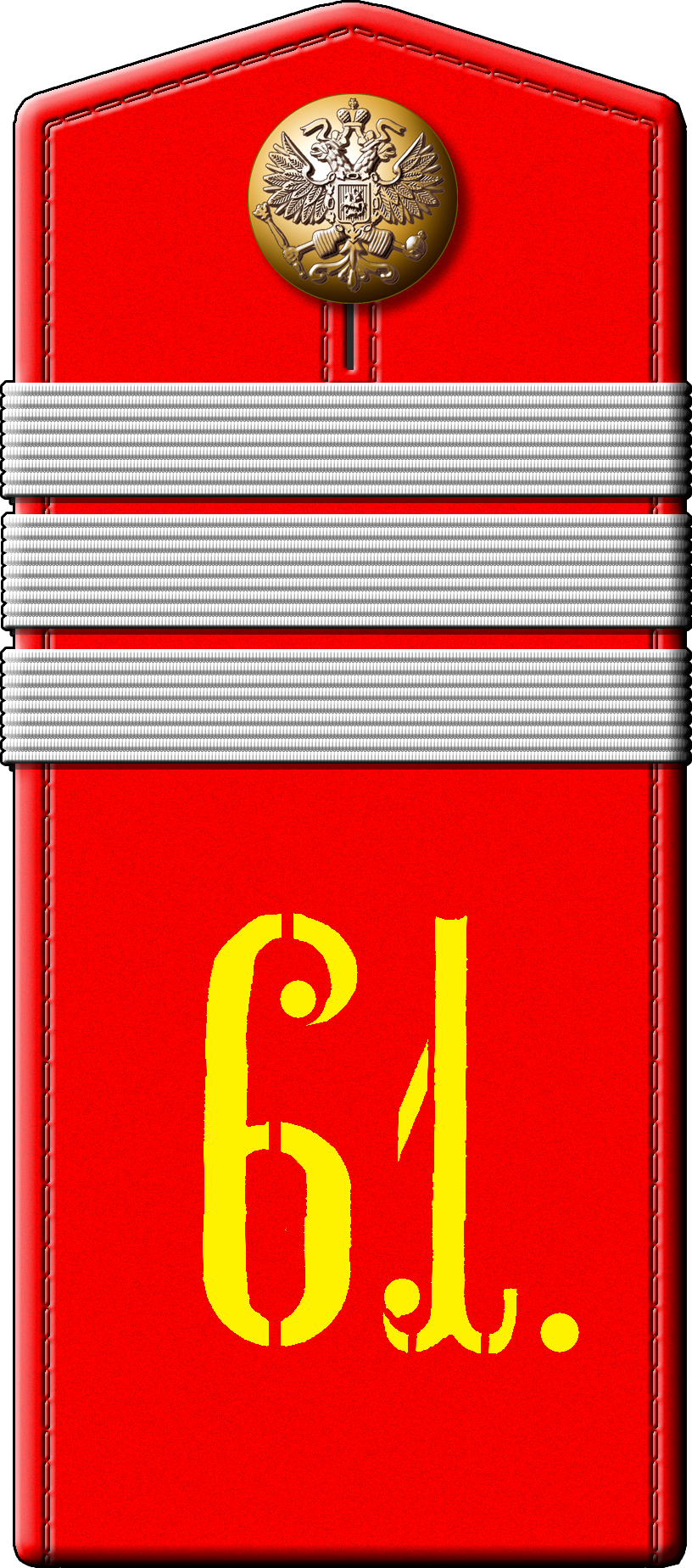
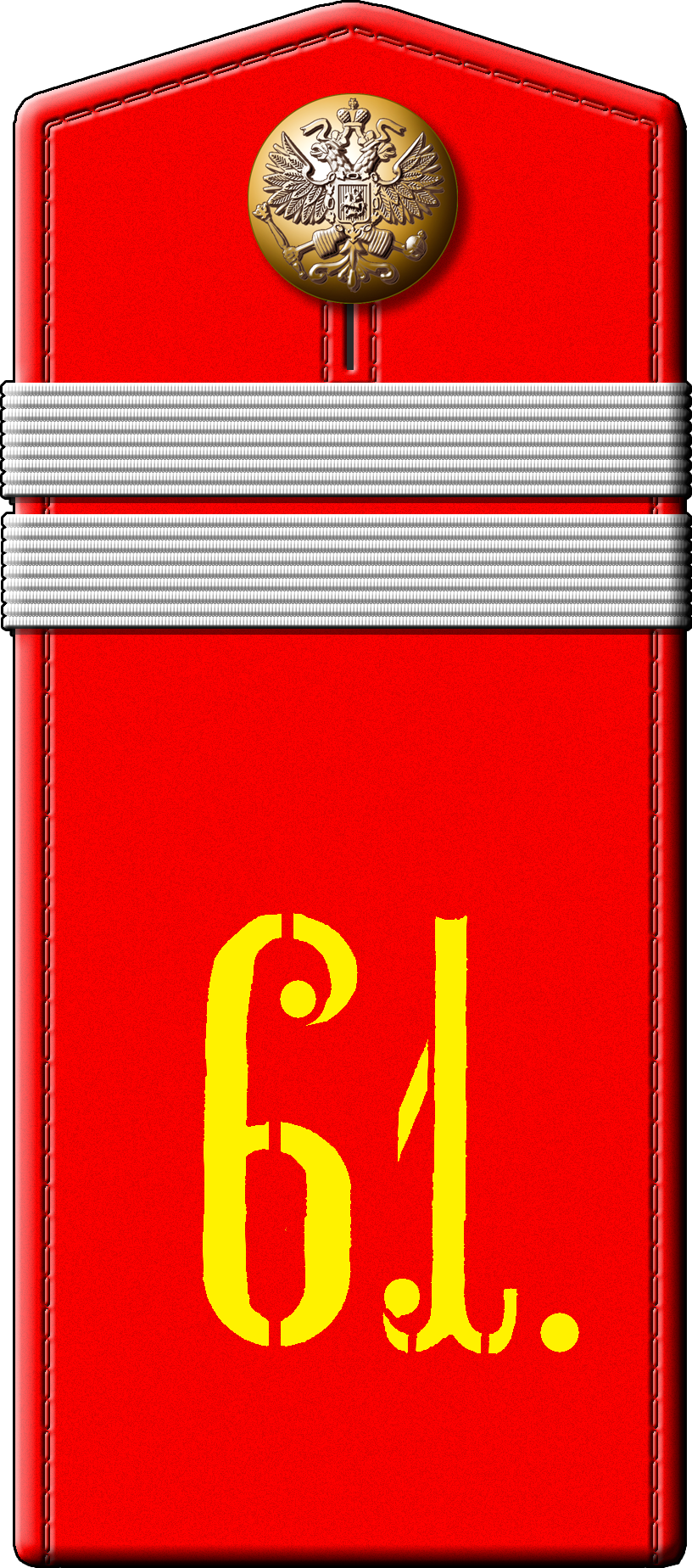
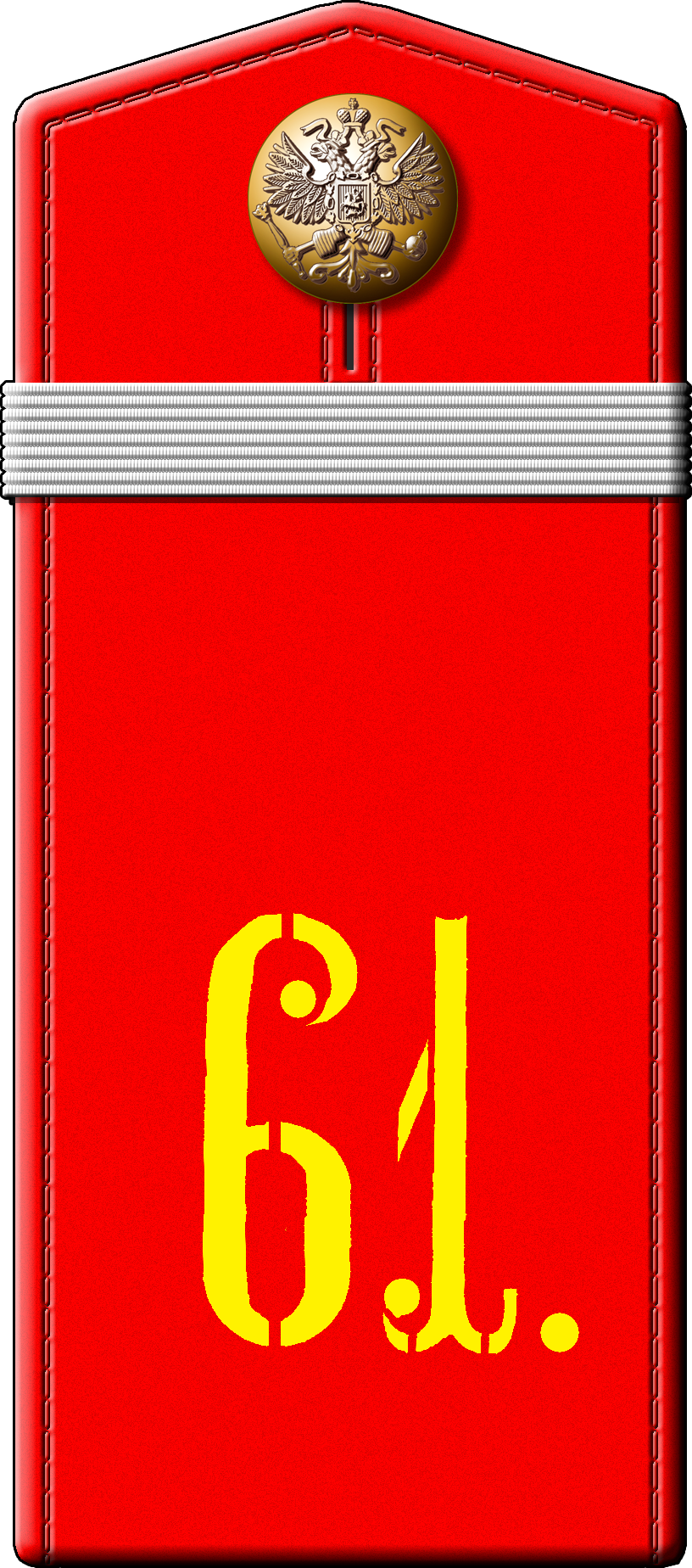
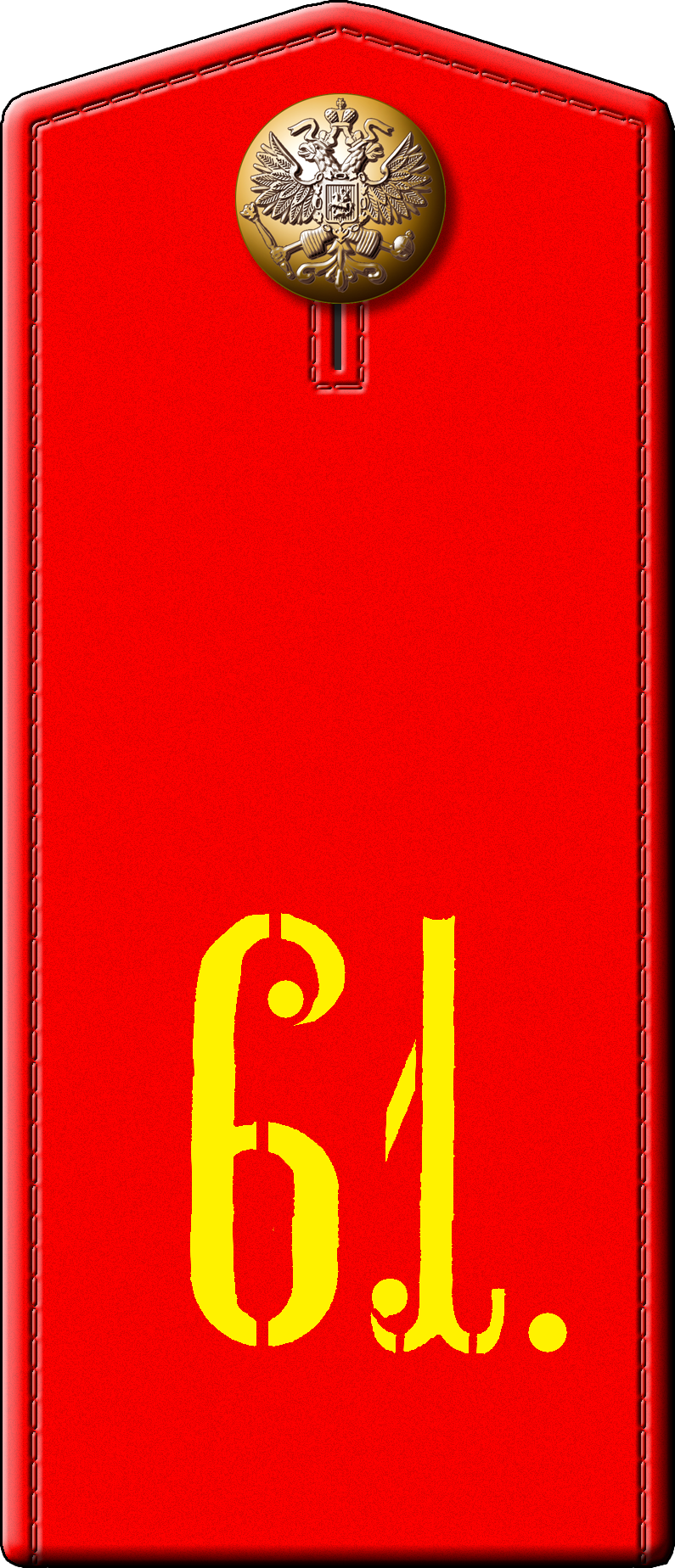
Description	Rank insignia as to the design 1904–1906
Shoulder straps
Rank designation	Zauryad-praporshchik (generated from feldfebel rank)	Feldfebel	Starshy unter-оfitser (en: senior NCO)	Мladshy unter-оfitser (en: junior NCO)	Yefeytor (en: Private first class)	Ryadovoy (en: Private)
Rank group	Unter-ofitsery (en: Non-commissioned officers)				Ryadovye (en: enlisted men)
