= 61st Regiment of Foot (disambiguation) =

Four regiments of the British Army have been numbered the 61st Regiment of Foot:

- 61st Regiment of Foot, raised in 1742 and disbanded in 1748.
- 59th (2nd Nottinghamshire) Regiment of Foot, 61st Regiment of Foot, raised in 1755 and renumbered as the 59th in 1756. It was amalgamated with the 30th (Cambridgeshire) Regiment of Foot in 1881 to form the East Lancashire Regiment.
- 76th Regiment of Foot (1756). Raised in November 1756 as the 61st Regiment, but renumbered to 76th, by General Order in 1758, and disbanded in 1763.
- 61st (South Gloucestershire) Regiment of Foot, formed in 1758 from the 2nd Battalion, 3rd Regiment of Foot. Amalgamated into the Gloucestershire Regiment in 1881.
