= 61st Corps (German Empire) =

61st Corps (Generalkommando zbV 61)
- Flag of the Staff of a Generalkommando (1871–1918)
- Active: November 1916-1919
- Disbanded: 1919
- Country: German Empire
- Branch: Army
- Engagements: World War I

Insignia
- Abbreviation: Genkdo zbV 61

The 61st Corps (German: Generalkommando zbV 61) was a corps formation of the German Army in World War I. It was formed in November 1916 and was still in existence at the end of the war.

== Chronicle ==
The 61st Corps (z.b.V.) was formed in November 1916.

With the onset of trench warfare, the German Army recognised that it was no longer possible to maintain the traditional Corps unit, that is, one made up of two divisions. Whereas at some times (and in some places) a Corps of two divisions was sufficient, at other times 5 or 6 divisions were necessary. Therefore, under the Hindenburg regime (from summer 1916), new Corps headquarters were created without organic divisions. These new Corps were designated General Commands for Special Use (German: Generalkommandos zur besonderen Verwendung).

61st Corps was still in existence at the end of the war.

== Commanders ==
The 61st Corps was commanded throughout its existence by Generalleutnant Karl Surén.

== See also ==
- German Army (German Empire)

== Bibliography ==
- Cron, Hermann (2002). Imperial German Army 1914-18: Organisation, Structure, Orders-of-Battle [first published: 1937]. Helion & Co. ISBN 1-874622-70-1.
