= 61st Street =

61st Street may refer to:

- 61st Street (Manhattan)
- 61st Street (TV series), a 2022 American television series

== See also ==
- 61st Street station (SEPTA), a SEPTA trolley stop in Philadelphia, Pennsylvania Subway–Surface Trolley
- 61st Street–Woodside station, a New York City Subway station
- 61st station (1893–1994) a Chicago Transit Authority station
