= JŽ series 611 =

JŽ 611
- In service: 1965–1974
- Manufacturer: TŽV Gredelj
- Constructed: 1961–1963
- Entered service: 1965
- Scrapped: 1974
- Number built: 3 sets
- Operators: Yugoslav Railways
- Lines served: Zagreb–Belgrade; Zagreb–Zadar

Specifications
- Train length: 82.122 m (269 ft 5 1/8 in)
- Maximum speed: 120 km/h (75 mph)
- Weight: 128 tonnes (126 long tons; 141 short tons)
- Prime mover(s): 2 x JW 400; 2 x Famos 2 F2/603
- Engine type: Diesel
- Transmission: Electric
- AAR wheel arrangement: Bo'Bo'+2'2'+2'2'+Bo'Bo'
- Track gauge: 1,435 mm (4 ft 8 1/2 in) standard gauge

The JŽ series 611 is a historic vehicle of Yugoslav Railways. It was a diesel-electric multiple unit made from aluminium alloy. It was nicknamed the "Aluminium train". A total of 3 units were made.

The first examples had a weak engine, but later models had a stronger one. They performed very well on level lines, but on mountain railways they suffered some damage.

== History ==
- Service start: 1965/9/28
- Last year of service: 1974
