= History of Russian military ranks =

Modern Russian military ranks trace their roots to the Table of Ranks established by Peter the Great. Most of the rank names were borrowed from existing German/Prussian, French, English, Dutch, and Polish ranks upon the formation of the Russian regular army in the late 17th century.

== Russian Tsardom ==
The Kievan Rus had no standing army apart from small druzhina (Russian: дружи́на), a permanent group of personal guards for the local knyaz (Russian: Князь, lit. 'prince'); an individual member of such a unit called a druzhinnik (дружи́нник). In times of war, the knyaz raised a militia comprising volunteers from the peasantry, and the druzhina served as the core of the troops. Each local knyaz served as the military leader of his troops. Such arrangements did not need permanent ranks or positions; they were created ad hoc, based on the task(s) at hand.

Upon the formation of Strelets troops in the mid-16th century, the low-level commanding officers were appointed to one of the following ranks:

- strelets (стреле́ц), a basic soldier
- desyatnik (деся́тник, 'of ten men'), acting as sergeant/corporal
- sotnik (со́тник, 'of one hundred men'), acting as captain

These were not personal ranks and were retained only as long as the officer held the position. For battles, the knyaz organized his troops into temporary high-level units, usually a polk (полк, Old Slavonic for group of troops), a regiment commanded by a golova (голова́, head) or voyevoda (воево́да, war leader); these commanding positions were not permanent and did not persist after the battle. The cossack cavalry units had their own ranks of Kazak (коза́к), yesaul (есау́л) and ataman (атама́н); they were not comparable to the strelets ranks.

Upon the formation of standing regiments (prikaz, later polk) by Ivan IV, new ranks insinuated themselves into the hierarchy between the existing grades: pyatidesyatnik (пятидеся́тник, of fifty men) acting as lieutenant, golova acting as colonel of the regiment (also, tysyatskiy (ты́сяцкий, 'of thousand men'). Later, a polugolova (полуголова́. half-golova) rank appeared; eventually golova was renamed polkovnik (полко́вник, of the polk), and polugolova was renamed podpolkovnik (sub-polkovnik). As usual, voyevoda was simply a commander of a large military group and not a rank of any kind.

Later, under the Romanov dynasty the companies of foreign mercenaries were formed; these incorporated the foreign ranks of Lieutenant and Rittmeister. They were later changed into the New Regiments of the Streltsy Troops and more Western ranks were adopted, including General. Finally, by 1680 the ranks of the New Regiments were unified with Strelets Troops.

Category	Foreign regiments	Streltsy	Equivalent NATO rank	
Private ranks	Soldat (солда́т), Reiter (рейта́р), Dragoon (драгу́н)	Strelets (стреле́ц)	OR-1	Private/Soldier
Non-commissioned officer(s) (У́нтер-офице́р(ы))	Kapral (капра́л; en: corporal)	Desyatnik (деся́тник; en: group leader of ten)	OR-2	Corporal
Non-commissioned officer(s) (У́нтер-офице́р(ы))	Podpraporshchik (подпра́порщик; en: praporshchik junjor rank)	—	OR-8	Master sergeant
Company-grade officers (Обер-офице́р(ы))	Praporshchik (пра́порщик, Flag bearer basing on Old Slavonic prapor (прапор), flag)	—	OF-1b	Officer cadet; Ensign
Company-grade officers (Обер-офице́р(ы))	Leytenant, Poruchik (лейтена́нт, пору́чик/ porucznik (latter is based on pl))	Pyatidesyatnik (пятидеся́тник; en: group leader of fifty)	OF-1a	1st Lieutenant
Company-grade officers (Обер-офице́р(ы))	Kapitan, Rotmistr (ru: капита́н, ро́тмистр; the latter is adaptation of German Rittmeister)	Sotnik (со́тник; en: group leader of one hundred)	OF-2	Captain
Line officers (Штаб-офицер(ы))	Mayor (ru: майо́р)	—	OF-3	Major
Line officers (Штаб-офицер(ы))	Podpolkovnik, also polupolkovnik (полуполко́вник, a halv-polkovnik)	Polugolova, also pyatisotenny golova (полуголова́, пятисо́тенный голова́)	OF-4	Lieutenant Colonel
Line officers (Штаб-офицер(ы))	Polkovnik (полко́вник, from Russian polk for regiment)	Golova, also polkovnik (голова́, полко́вник)	OF-5	Colonel
General ranks	General-mayor (ru: генера́л-майо́р)	—	OF-6	Major general
General ranks	General-poruchik (генера́л-пору́чик)	—	OF-7	Lieutenant general

== Russian Empire ==
During the beginning of the 18th century, military ranks were frequently changed by the tsar during efforts to reform the army and create a strong Navy. These many changes were routinely documented in the Army's Rules of engagement since 1716 until they were finally incorporated into the first variant of Table of Ranks in 1722. Compared to Strelets Troops, a few more non-commissioned ranks were added, the soldier rank was replaced with many specialty ranks, and a few more General ranks were added. The naval ranks were created from scratch, ranks for the naval infantry and engineers would only come in the 19th century.

The officers were styled according to their rank as defined by the Table.

=== 1722–1917: Army ===
By 1722, the ranks of both enlisted staff and commissioned/non-commissioned officers were somewhat settled; these ranks survived until the Russian Revolution with only minor adjustments.

Captain-Poruchik rank is comparable to Lieutenant Captain. Note that Poruchik can sometimes be styled as Porutchik, as it was originally written by the tsar himself.

Commissioned officers of artillery and engineers enjoyed a handicap of 1 grade, and the Leib Guards units enjoyed a handicap of 2 grades, ending in Life Guards colonel.

In the 1798–1884 timeline, the General ranks were streamlined, and the brigadier rank was abolished. The captain-poruchik rank was reestablished, this time as staff-captain. The second major and first major ranks were united. In 1826, the Russian Army adopted shoulder insignia and distinct Cossack cavalry ranks.

In 1884, major and captain-lieutenant ranks were abolished again and the ranks below were shifted several grades up. The latter was not reintroduced until 1907, but then again abolished in 1911.

Ranks of the Imperial Russian Army
Grade	Category	Army, Infantry	Cavalry (from 1731)	Artillery, Engineer	Cossacks
I	Generals	Generalissimo (Генерали́ссимус) General-Fieldmarshal of Russia (генерал-фельдмаршал)			
II	Generals	Général en Chef (генера́л-анше́ф) (1730—1796) General of the Infantry (генера́л от инфанте́рии ) (1796–1917); Adjutant General (генера́л-адъюта́нт ) (1701–1917); Quartermaster General (генера́л-квартирме́йстер) (1701–1916)	General of the Cavalry (генера́л от кавале́рии)	General of the Artillery (генера́л от артилле́рии) (since 1796) General Feldzeugmeister (генера́л-фельдцейхме́йстер) until 1796; Engineer-General (инжене́р-генера́л) (since 1802); General Provisionsmeister (генера́л-провиантме́йстер) until 1796	No equivalent
III	Generals	General-Poruchik (генера́л-пору́чик) (until 1800); Lieutenant General (генера́л-лейтена́нт) (since 1800)		General-Poruchik (генера́л-пору́чик)	Lieutenant General (генера́л-лейтена́нт)
IV	Generals	Major General (генера́л-майо́р)			
V	Stab-ofizers	Brigadier (бригади́р) (until 1798)		—	No equivalent
VI	Stab-ofizers	Polkovnik (полко́вник)			Polkovnik
VII	Stab-ofizers	Podpolkovnik (подполко́вник); Krigskomissar logistics (Кригскомиссар по снабжению) 1713—1868		Podpolkovnik	Podpolkovnik (abolished 1884), Cossack major, Войсковой старшина (from 1884 onward)
VIII	Stab-ofizers	Premier/First Major (премье́р-майо́р); Second major (секу́нд-майо́р) (both until 1827), Major (майо́р)		Major (майо́р)	Cossack Major (войсковой старшина) (until 1884)
VIII	Ober-ofizers	—		Kapitan (капита́н)	Yesaul (есаул)
IX	Ober-ofizers	Kapitan (капита́н)	Rittmeister/Ride Master (ро́тмистр)	Captain-Poruchik/Captain Lieutenant (капита́н-пору́чик) (until 1731 and since 1765)	Junior Yesaul (подъесаул)
X	Ober-ofizers	Captain-Poruchik/Captain lieutenant (капита́н-пору́чик) (until 1731); Stabs-Captain/Staff captain (штабс-капита́н)	Stabs-Rittmeister/Staff-Ritmeister/Ride Master (штабс-ро́тмистр) (until 1798)	Poruchik (пору́чик)	Centurion (сотник)
XI	Ober-ofizers	Leytenant (лейтена́нт) or Poruchik (пору́чик) (since 1765)		Sub-Poruchik/Sub-lieutenant (подпору́чик) (since 1765)	Ensign (хорунжий)
XII	Ober-ofizers	Lieutenant (лейтена́нт) or Poruchik (пору́чик) (until 1765); Sub-Poruchik/Sub-lieutenant (подпору́чик) since 1765		Sub-Poruchik/Sub-lieutenant (подпору́чик) (until 1765)	
XIII	Ober-ofizers	Sub-Poruchik/Sub-lieutenant (подпору́чик) (until 1765)		Bayonet-Junker (штык-ю́нкер); Praporshchik/Ensign (пра́порщик) since 1765	No equivalent
XIV	Ober-ofizers	Praporshchik/Fähnrich/Senior Ensign (пра́порщик / фе́нрих / фе́ндрик)	Cornet (корне́т)	Deputy Praporshchik/Ensign (зауряд-пра́порщик)	No equivalent
Unter-ofizers		Deputy Praporshchik/Probationary Ensign (зауряд-пра́порщик) (since 1884) Sub-Praporshchik (подпра́порщик) (1826–1884); Feldwebel (фельдфе́бель) (1765–1826); Senior Sergeant (ста́рший сержа́нт)	Wachtmeister/Watch Master (вáхмистр) (until 1884); none (since 1884)	Deputy Praporshchik/Probationary Ensign (зауряд-пра́порщик) (since 1884) Sub-Praporshchik/Junior Ensign(подпра́порщик) (1826–1884); Feldwebel (фельдфе́бель) (1765–1826)	No equivalent
Unter-ofizers		Sub-Praporshchik (подпра́порщик) (since 1884) Feldwebel (фельдфе́бель) (1826–1884); Portupey Praporshchik (портупе́й пра́порщик) (1798–1826); Sergeant (сержа́нт) (1765–1798); Junior Sergeant (мл́адший сержа́нт)	Wachtmeister (вáхмистр) (since 1884) Feldwebel (фельдфе́бель) (1826–1884); Estandart Junker (эстандáрт-ю́нкер) (1798–1826)	Sub-Praporshchik/Junior Ensign (подпра́порщик) (since 1884) Feldwebel (фельдфе́бель) (1826–1884); Portupey Junker (портупéй-ю́нкер) (1798–1826)	Junior Ensign (подхорунжий)
Unter-ofizers		Feldwebel (фельдфе́бель) (1884–1917) Sergeant (сержа́нт) (1826–1884); Sub-Praporshchik (подпра́порщик) (until 1826)	Feldwebel (фельдфе́бель) (1884–1917); Sub-Praporshchik (подпра́порщик) (1765–1826); Gefreit-Corporal (гефре́йт-капра́л) (1731–1765)	Feldwebel (фельдфе́бель) (1884–1917) Sub-Praporshchik (подпра́порщик) (until 1826)	Wachtmeister (вáхмистр) (since 1884)
Unter-ofizers		Kaptenarmus (каптена́рмус); Senior Unteroffizier/Under Officer (ста́рший у́нтер-офице́р) (since 1800)		Senior Gunner (старший фейерверкер)	Senior Warden (старший урядник)
Unter-ofizers		Farrier (фурье́р)			
Unter-ofizers		Corporal (капра́л); Unteroffizier (у́нтер-офице́р) (later Junior Unteroffizier) (младший унтер-офицер)		Junior Gunner (младший фейерверкер)	Junior Warden (младший урядник)
Privates		Gefreiter (гефре́йтор)		Bombardier (бомбардир)	Trooper First Class (приказный)
Privates		Private, Musketeer, Fusilier, Jaeger, Grenadier, Pikenier, Hajduk, Strelets, Archer, Rifleman etc. (рядовой, мушкетёр, фузилёр, е́герь, гренадёр, пикинёр, гайду́к, стреле́ц, лу́чник и т.д.)	Dragoon, Hussar, Cuirassiers, Uhlan, Lancer, Chevau-léger, Horse Grenadier, Carabinier, etc. (драгу́н, гуса́р, кираси́р, улáн, ланцéр и т.д.)	Cannonier, Gunner, Handlanger, Sapper, Pioneer, Miner, Pontooner etc. (канони́р, гандлаге́р, сапёр, пионе́р, минёр, понтонёр и т.д.)	Cossack (каза́к)

=== 1722–1917: Navy ===
As stated earlier, most of the naval ranks and rates were formed from scratch in the 18th century, with many changes since then. Ranks for naval infantry, shore service personnel, and engineers would only come in the 19th century.

Ranks of the Imperial Russian Navy (Deck personnel)
Grade	Category	Rank
I	Admirals	General Admiral (генера́л-адмира́л)
II	Admirals	Admiral (адмира́л)
III	Admirals	Vice Admiral (ви́це-адмира́л)
IV	Admirals	Schout-bij-nacht (шаутбейна́хт) until 1724; Rear Admiral or Counter Admiral since 1724 (ко́нтр-адмира́л)
V	Stab-ofizers	Captain-Commodore (капита́н-командо́р) (until 1764) and (1798–1826); Captain of Brigadier rank (капита́н брагади́рского ра́нга) (1764–1798)
VI	Stab-ofizers	Captain 1st rank (капита́н 1-го ра́нга) (from 1751 onward), Ship-of-the-line captain (Капитан корабля) (1701 – 1713 and 1732 – 1751)
VII	Stab-ofizers	Captain 2nd rank (капита́н 2-го ра́нга)
VIII	Stab-ofizers	Captain 3rd rank (капита́н 3-го ра́нга) (until 1730); Captain-Poruchik (капита́н-поручи́к) (until 1784); Captain Lieutenant (капита́н-лейтена́нт) (since 1784)
IX	Ober-ofizers	Senior Lieutenant (Старший лейтенант) (1909–17), Lieutenant (лейтена́нт) or Poruchik (пору́чик) (since 1884)
X	Ober-ofizers	Unter leytenant (ýнтер лейтена́нт) (until 1724); Poruchik (пору́чик) (until 1884); Michman (ми́чман) (since 1884)
XI	Ober-ofizers	Ship Secretary (корабе́льный секрета́рь) (until 1834); Podporuchik (подпору́чик) (until 1884)
XII	Ober-ofizers	Michman (ми́чман) (1864–1884)
XIII	Ober-ofizers	Michman (ми́чман) (1758–1864), Brevet Michman/Gardemarin (гардемарин) (1827–1883)
XIV	Ober-ofizers	
Unter-ofizers		Senior Boatswain (Старший боцман)
Unter-ofizers		Stuurman (шту́рман); Senior Unteroffizier (ста́рший у́нтер-офице́р); Conductor (кондукто́р)
Unter-ofizers		Skipper (шки́пер)
Unter-ofizers		Michman (ми́чман) (until 1758); Unteroffizier (у́нтер-офице́р) (since 1758); Konstapel (конста́пель)
Unter-ofizers		Bootsmann (Bosun) (бо́цман); Shipman, (Schoonerman) (шхи́ман)
Unter-ofizers		Sub Skipper (подшхи́ман); Sub Stuurman, (подшту́рман); Bootsmannmaat (боцманма́т); Shchiemanmaat (шхиманма́т)
Unter-ofizers		Quartermaster (квартирмéйстер)
Seamen		1st rank Seaman (матро́с 1-й статьи́)
Seamen		2nd rank Seaman (матро́с 2-й статьи́)

Ranks of the Imperial Russian Navy (Naval Infantry and shore service personnel)
Grade	Category	Rank
I	General Officers	No equivalent
II	General Officers	Fleet General (Флота генерал)
III	General Officers	Fleet Lieutenant General (Флота генерал-лейтенант)
IV	General Officers	Fleet Major General (Флота генерал-майор)
V	Staff Officers	Admiralty Brigadier (бригади́р по адмиралтейству) (until 1830)
VI	Staff Officers	Admiralty Colonel (Полковник по адмиралтейству)
VII	Staff Officers	Admiralty Lieutenant Colonel(Подполковник по адмиралтейству)
VIII	Staff Officers	Admiralty Major (Майор по адмиралтейству)(1830–1884), Admiralty Captain (Капитан по адмиралтейству)(1884–1917)
IX	Officers	Admiralty Captain (Капитан по адмиралтейству)(1828–1884), Admiralty Staff Captain (Штабс-капитан по адмиралтейству) (1884–1917)
X	Officers	Admiralty Staff Captain (Штабс-капитан по адмиралтейству) (until 1884)
XI	Officers	Admiralty Captain Lieutenant (Капитан-пору́чик по адмиралтейству)(1907–1912), Admiralty Lieutenant (Поручик по адмиралтейству) (1884–1917)
XII	Officers	Admiralty Lieutenant (Поручик по адмиралтейству) (1829–1884), Admiralty Sub-lieutenant (Подпоручик по адмиралтейству) (1885–1917)
XIII	Officers	Admiralty Sub-lieutenant (Подпоручик по адмиралтейству) (until 1885)
XIV	Officers	Admiralty Ensign (Прапорщик по адмиралтейству)
Under-Officers
Under-Officers		Marine acting ensign (Морской зауряд-прапорщик) (1884–1917)
Under-Officers		Marine Junior Ensign (Морской подпрапорщик)
Under-Officers		Marine Feldwebel (Морской фельдфебель) (1884–1917), Marine Sergeant (Морской сержа́нт) (1830–1884)
Under-Officers		Marine Senior Unteroffizier (Морской старший унтер-офицер)
Under-Officers		Marine Junior Unteroffizier (Морской малдший унтер-офицер), Marine Corporal (Морской капра́л)
Privates, Marines		Marine Gefreiter, Marine Lance Corporal (Морской ефрейтор)
Privates, Marines		Private, Marine (Морской солдат)

Ranks of the Imperial Russian Navy (Naval Artillery and Coastal Defense)
Grade	Category	Rank
I	General Officers	No equivalent
II	General Officers	General of Marine Artillery (Генерал морской артиллерии)
III	General Officers	Lieutenant General (Генерал-лейтенант морской артиллерии)
IV	General Officers	Major General (Генерал-майор морской артиллерии)
V	Staff Officers	Brigadier (бригади́р морской артиллерии) (till 1830)
VI	Staff Officers	Colonel (Полковник морской артиллерии)
VII	Staff Officers	Lieutenant Colonel(Подполковник морской артиллерии)
VIII	Staff Officers	Major (Майор морской артиллерии)(1830–1884), Captain (Капитан морской артиллерии)(1884–1917)
IX	Officers	Captain (Капитан морской артиллерии)(1828–1884), Staff Captain (Штабс-капитан морской артиллерии) (1884–1917)
X	Officers	Staff Captain (Штабс-капитан морской артиллерии) (until 1884)
XI	Officers	Captain Lieutenant (Капитан-пору́чик морской артиллерии)(1907–1912), Lieutenant (Поручик морской артиллерии) (1884–1917)
XII	Officers	Lieutenant (Поручик морской артиллерии) (1829–1884), Sub-lieutenant (Подпоручик морской артиллерии) (1885–1917)
XIII	Officers	Sub-lieutenant (Подпоручик морской артиллерии) (until 1885)
XIV	Officers	Ensign (Прапорщик морской артиллерии)
Under-Officers
Under-Officers		Acting ensign (Морской зауряд-прапорщик морской артиллерии) (1884–1917)
Under-Officers		Junior Ensign (Морской подпрапорщик морской артиллерии)
Under-Officers		Marine Feldwebel (фельдфебель морской артиллерии) (1884–1917), Marine Sergeant (Морской сержа́нт) (1830–1884)
Under-Officers		Marine Senior Unteroffizier (Морской старший унтер-офицер), Marine Senior Gunner (Морской старший фейерверкер)
Under-Officers		Marine Junior Unteroffizier (Морской малдший унтер-офицер), Marine Junior Gunner (Морской младший фейерверкер), Marine Corporal (Морской капра́л)
Privates, Gunners		Marine Gefreiter, Marine Lance Corporal (Морской ефрейтор)
Privates, Gunners		Private, Marine (Морской солдат)

=== White Movement (1918–1921) ===
Although the White Movement generally retained the old imperial system, there were a few modifications. Most importantly, the ranks of praporshchik and lieutenant colonel were abolished as redundant by 1919.

== RSFSR and Soviet Union ==
=== 1918–1925 ===
The October Revolution of 1917 abolished the privileges of the Russian nobility (Dvoryanstvo). The Table of Ranks was abolished and so were personal military ranks. Based on the teachings of Karl Marx to replace a regular army with the general arming of the people, the Bolsheviks abolished the Imperial army on 16 March 1918. But the need for an armed struggle against the counter-revolution, and foreign military intervention forced the CEC and the CPC, January 15, 1918, to issue a decree establishing of the "Workers' and Peasants' Red Army", very early before the disbandment of the Imperial ground forces.

At first, the new army had no ranks, aside from the single rank of "RedArmyMan". However, due to a real need, first informally and then more formally (although no document on an introduction of ranks or names of commanders was issued) in official correspondence acronyms began to appear representing position-holder titles. For example, komdiv was an acronym of Division Commander; likewise kombat stood for Battalion Commander, etc. By the middle of the civil war (January 1919), these "positional ranks" became quite formal, and since January 1920 the names of officers were fixed by the Order of the Red Army. Instead of ranks, these were officially known as "categories of the Red Army." This system was maintained until May 1924. Some of these acronyms have survived as informal position names to the present day.

During the civil war, ships did not play a significant role. Many of the sailors and petty officers of the fleet went to fight on land in the Red Army. For a long time, a scale of naval ranks did not exist at all. Most of the naval officers were addressed either by their position or by their tsarist rank with the addition of the prefix byvshiy (abbreviated as "b."), which meant "former". In 1924, the real rehabilitation and creation of the fleet began. Personal ranks as such did not exist during this period in the Navy.

By then, the only new rank created was the sergeant major (Starshina) rank in the Red Army. It was first introduced in the Worker's and Peasant's Red Navy at the same time, with the old Imperial Naval rank of bootsmann in the Navy the only old rank still used.

The Soviet Air Forces began as a committee for ex-Imperial military aviation in 1918 and was later transformed into a separate service as the Workers and Peasants Red Air Fleet. It shared the same ranks as the Army, and the naval air component shared the ranks of its mother service.

Army appointments		Naval appointments	
Categories		Names of key posts	Groups
Red Commanders; Краскомы (Kraskomy)	People's Commissar for Military and Naval Affairs; Наркомвоенмор (Narkomvoyenmor)		Supreme Commanders (Высший командный и начальствующий состав)
Red Commanders; Краскомы (Kraskomy)	Front Commander; Комфронта (Komfronta)	No equivalent	Supreme Commanders (Высший командный и начальствующий состав)
Red Commanders; Краскомы (Kraskomy)	Commandarm; Командарм (Komandarm)	Chief of the Navy; Начморси (Nachmorsi)	Supreme Commanders (Высший командный и начальствующий состав)
Red Commanders; Краскомы (Kraskomy)	Comcor; Комкор (Komkor)	Ship Divizia Chief; Начальник дивизии кораблей (Nachalnik divizii korabley)	Supreme Commanders (Высший командный и начальствующий состав)
Red Commanders; Краскомы (Kraskomy)	Comdiv; Начдив (Nachdiv)	Ship Brigade Commander; Командир бригады кораблей (Komandir brigady korabley)	Supreme Commanders (Высший командный и начальствующий состав)
Red Commanders; Краскомы (Kraskomy)	Combrig; Комбриг (Kombrig)	Ship Divizion Commander; Командир дивизиона кораблей (Komandir diviziona korabley)	Senior Commanders (Старший командный и начальствующий состав)
Red Commanders; Краскомы (Kraskomy)	Regimental Commander; Комполка (Kompolka)	Ship Commander; Командир корабля (Komandir korablya)	Senior Commanders (Старший командный и начальствующий состав)
Red Commanders; Краскомы (Kraskomy)	Combat; Комбат (Kombat)	Senior Assistant of Ship Commander; Старший помощник командира корабля (Starshiy pomoshchnik komandira korablya)	Senior Commanders (Старший командный и начальствующий состав)
Red Commanders; Краскомы (Kraskomy)	Assistant of Combat; Помкомбат (Pomkombat)	Assistant of Ship Commander; Помощник командира корабля (Pomoshchnik komandira korablya)	Senior Commanders (Старший командный и начальствующий состав)
Red Commanders; Краскомы (Kraskomy)	Company Commander or Escadron Commander; Комроты or Комэск (Komroty) or (Komesk)	Combatant Commander; Командир боевой части (Komandir boyevoy chasti)	Middleweight Commanders (Средний командный и начальствующий состав)
Red Commanders; Краскомы (Kraskomy)	Assistant of Company Commander or Assistant of Escadron Commander; Помкомроты or Помкомэск (Pomkomroty) or (Pomkomesk)	Group Commander; Командир группы (Komandir gruppy)	Middleweight Commanders (Средний командный и начальствующий состав)
Red Commanders; Краскомы (Kraskomy)	Platoon Commander; Комвзвода (Komvzvoda)	Squad Commander; Командир отделения (Komandir otdeleniya)	Middleweight Commanders (Средний командный и начальствующий состав)
Red Commanders; Краскомы (Kraskomy)	Starshina; Старшина (Starshina)	No equivalent	Junior Сommanders (Младший командный и начальствующий состав)
Red Commanders; Краскомы (Kraskomy)	Assistant of Platoon Commander; Помкомвзвода (Pomkomvzvoda)	Starshina or Boatswain/Bootsmann; Старшина or боцман (Starshina) or (Botsman)	Junior Сommanders (Младший командный и начальствующий состав)
Red Commanders; Краскомы (Kraskomy)	Squad Commander; Комот (Komot)	No equivalent	Junior Сommanders (Младший командный и начальствующий состав)
Redarmymen; Красноармейцы (Krasnoarmeytsy)	Redarmyman; Красноармеец (Krasnoarmeyets)	Redfleetman; Краснофлотец (Krasnoflotets)	Privates (Рядовой состав)

=== 1925–1935 ===
By that year, the ranks were expanded to match the military ranks of other countries' armed forces. The Soviet Air Forces soon received its own ranks.

Categories	Names of key posts			Groups
Categories	Army appointments	Naval appointments	Aviation appointments	Groups
K-14	Front Commander; Командующий фронтом (Komanduyushchiy frontom)	Chief of Navy of the Republic; Главнокомандующий флотом республики (Glavnokomanduyushchiy flotom respubliky)	Chief of the Soviet Air Force 'Hачальник BBC CCCP (Nachalnik VVS SSSR)	Supreme Commanders (Высший командный и начальствующий состав)
K-13	Commandarm; Командующий армией (Komanduyushchiy armiey) & Assistant of Front Commander; Помощник командующего фронтом (Pomoshchnik komanduyushchego frontom)	Fleet Commander; Командующий флотом (Komanduyushchiy flotom)	Deputy Chief of the Soviet Air Force; Помощник начальника BBC CCCP (Pomoshchnik Nachalnika VVS SSSR)	Supreme Commanders (Высший командный и начальствующий состав)
K-12	Comcor; Командир корпуса (Komandir korpusa) & Assistant of Army Commander; Помощник командующего армией (Pomoshchnik komanduyushchego armiey)	Flotilla Commander; Командующий флотилией (Komanduyushchiy flotiliey)	Air Brigade Commander; Командующий авиабригады (Komanduyushchiy aviabrigadi)	Supreme Commanders (Высший командный и начальствующий состав)
K-11	Comdiv; Командир дивизии (Komandir divizii) & Assistant of Corps Commander; Помощник командира корпуса (Pomoshchnik komandira korpusa)	Escadre Commander; Командующий эскадрой (Komanduyushchiy eskadroy)		Supreme Commanders (Высший командный и начальствующий состав)
K-10	Combrig; Командир бригады (Komandir brigady) & Assistant of the Divizia Commander; Помощник командира дивизии (Pomoshchnik komandira divizii)	Ship Brigade Commander; Командир бригады кораблей (Komandir brigady korabley)	Air Squadron Commander; Командующий эскадрильи (Komanduyushchiy eskadrily)	Supreme Commanders (Высший командный и начальствующий состав)
K-9	Regimental Commander; Командир полка (Komandir polka) & Assistant of the Brigade Commander; Помощник командира бригады (Pomoshchnik komandira brigady)	Ship Commander, 1st rank Командир корабля 1-го ранга (Komandir korablya 1-go ranga)	Air Park Commander; Командующий авиапарка (Komanduyushchiy aviaparka)	Senior Commanders (Старший командный и начальствующий состав)
K-8	Assistant of the Regimental Commander; Помощник командира полка (Pomoshchnik komandira polka)	Senior Assistant of Ship Commander 1st rank Старший помощник командира корабля 1-го ранга (Starshiy pomoshchnik komandira korablya 1-ranga)	Air Flight Senior Commander; Командующий отдельного авиаотряда (Komanduyushchiy otdelynogo aviaotryada)	Senior Commanders (Старший командный и начальствующий состав)
K-7	Combat; Командир батальона (Komandir bataliona)	Ship Commander, 2nd rank Командир корабля 2-го ранга (Komandir korablya 2-go ranga)	Air Flight Commander; Командующий авиаотряда (Komanduyushchiy aviaotryada)	Senior Commanders (Старший командный и начальствующий состав)
K-6	Assistant of Battalion Commander; Помощник командира батальона (Pomoshchnik komandira bataliona)	Ship Commander, 3rd rank Командир корабля 3-го ранга (Komandir korablya 3-go ranga) & Senior Assistant of Ship Commander 2nd rank Старший помощник командира корабля 2-го ранга (Starshiy pomoshchnik komandira korablya 2-ranga)	Air Detail Commander; Командующий авиазвена (Komanduyushchiy aviazvena)	Middleweight Commanders (Средний командный и начальствующий состав)
K-5	Company Commander; Командир роты (Komandir roty)	Ship Commander, 4th rank Командир корабля 4-го ранга (Komandir korablya 4-go ranga) & Senior Assistant of Ship Commander 3rd rank Старший помощник командира корабля 3-го ранга (Starshiy pomoshchnik komandira korablya 3-ranga)	Senior Pilot; Старший летчик (Starshiy Letchik)	Middleweight Commanders (Средний командный и начальствующий состав)
K-4	Assistant of Company Commander; Помощник командира роты (Pomoshchnik komandira roty)	Senior Assistant of Ship Commander 4th rank Старший помощник командира корабля 4-го ранга (Starshiy pomoshchnik komandira korablya 4-ranga)	Junior Pilot; Младший летчик (Mladshy lyotchik)	Middleweight Commanders (Средний командный и начальствующий состав)
K-3	Platoon Commander; Командир взвода (Komandir vzvoda)	Combatant Commander; Командир боевой части (Komandir boyevoy chasti) & Assistant of Ship Commander 4th rank Помощник командира корабля 4-го ранга (Pomoshchnik komandira korablya 4-ranga)	Air Platoon Commander; Командир взвода (Komandir vzvoda)	Middleweight Commanders (Средний командный и начальствующий состав)
K-2	Starshina; Старшина (Starshina)	Chief Starshina; Главный cтаршина (Glavni Starshina),& Chief Boatswain/Bootsmann; Главный боцман (Glavniy botsman)	Senior Motorist; Старший моторист (Starshiy Motorist)	Junior Сommanders (Младший командный и начальствующий состав)
K-2	Assistant of Platoon Commander; Помощник командира взвода (Pomoshchnik komandira vzvoda)	Senior Boatswain/Bootsmann; Старший боцман (Starshiy botsman)	Motorist; Mоторист (Motorist)	Junior Сommanders (Младший командный и начальствующий состав)
K-1	Squad Commander; Командир отделения (Komandir otdeleniya)	Squad Commander; Командир отделения (Komandir otdeleniya) & Boatswain/Bootsmann; Боцман (Botsman)	Junior Motorist; Младший моторист (Mladshy motorist)	Junior Сommanders (Младший командный и начальствующий состав)
K-1	Fireteam Commander; Командир звена (Komandir zvena) & Assistant of Squad Commander; Помощник командира отделения (Pomoshchnik komandira otdeleniya)	Group Commander; Командир группы (Komandir gruppy) & Assistant of Squad Commander; Помощник командира отделения (Pomoshchnik komandira otdeleniya)		Junior Сommanders (Младший командный и начальствующий состав)
К-0	Redarmyman; Красноармеец (Krasnoarmeyets)	Redfleetman; Краснофлотец (Krasnoflotets)	Redairfleetman; Красновоздухоплаватель (Krasnoboedukhoplavately)	Privates (Рядовой состав)

=== 1935–1940 ===
Personal ranks were formally introduced in the Red Army on September 22, 1935, including the rank of marshal of the Soviet Union, which was adopted the year before.

Categories	Ranks							
Categories	Privates & Commanders		Political staff	Technical staff		Administrative staff	Medical (Vet) staff	Juristical staff
Categories	Ground and Air Forces	Naval Forces	Political staff	Ground and Air Forces	Naval Forces	Administrative staff	Medical (Vet) staff	Juristical staff
Privates and Junior Сommanders (Рядовой и младший командный и начальствующий состав)	Redarmyman; Красноармеец (Krasnoarmeyets)	Redfleetman; Краснофлотец (Krasnoflotets)	No equivalent	No equivalent	No equivalent	No equivalent	No equivalent	No equivalent
Privates and Junior Сommanders (Рядовой и младший командный и начальствующий состав)	Squad Commander; Отделенный командир (Otdelenniy komandir)	Squad Commander; Отделенный командир (Otdelenniy komandir)	No equivalent	No equivalent	No equivalent	No equivalent	No equivalent	No equivalent
Privates and Junior Сommanders (Рядовой и младший командный и начальствующий состав)	Junior Platoon Commander; Младший комзвода (Mladshy komzvoda)	No equivalent	No equivalent	No equivalent	No equivalent	No equivalent	No equivalent	No equivalent
Privates and Junior Сommanders (Рядовой и младший командный и начальствующий состав)	Starshina; Старшина (Starshina)	Starshina; Старшина (Starshina)	No equivalent	No equivalent	No equivalent	No equivalent	No equivalent	No equivalent
Middleweight Commanders (Средний командный и начальствующий состав)	Junior Lieutenant; Младший лейтенант (Mladshy leytenant)	Junior Lieutenant; Младший лейтенант (Mladsh leytenant)	No equivalent	Junior Military Technician; Младший воентехник (Mladshy voentekhnik)	Junior Military Technician; Младший воентехник (Mladshy voentekhnik)	No equivalent	No equivalent	No equivalent
Middleweight Commanders (Средний командный и начальствующий состав)	Lieutenant; Лейтенант (Leytenant)	Lieutenant; Лейтенант (Leytenant)	Junior Politruk; Младший политрук (Mladshy politruk)	Military Technician 2nd rank Воентехник 2 ранга (Voentekhnik 2 ranga)	Military Technician 2nd rank Воентехник 2 ранга (Voentekhnik 2 ranga)	Technician-Intendant 2nd rank Техник-интендант 2 ранга (Tehnik-intendant 2 ranga)	Military Feldscher / Military Vet Feldscher; Военфельдшер/ветвоенфельдшер (Voenfeldsher/vetvoenfeldsher)	Junior Military Jurist; Младший военюрист (Mladshy voenyurist)
Middleweight Commanders (Средний командный и начальствующий состав)	Senior Lieutenant; Старший лейтенант (Starshy leytenant)	Senior Lieutenant; Старший лейтенант (Starshy leytenant)	Politruk; Политрук (Politruk)	Military Technician 1st rank Воентехник 1 ранга (Voentekhnik 1 ranga)	Military Technician 1st rank Воентехник 1 ранга (Voentekhnik 1 ranga)	Technician-Intendant 1st rank Техник-интендант 1 ранга (Tehnik-intendant 1 ranga)	Senior Military Feldscher / Senior Military Vet Feldscher; Старший военфельдшер / Старший ветвоенфельдшер (Starshiy voenfeldsher/Starshy vetvoenfeldsher)	Military Jurist; Военюрист (Voenyurist)
Senior Commanders (Старший командный и начальствующий состав)	Captain; Капитан (Kapitan)	Captain-Lieutenant; Капитан-лейтенант (Kapitan-leytenant)	Senior Politruk; Старший политрук (Starshiy politruk)	Military Engineer 3rd rank Военинженер 3 ранга (Voeninzhener 3 ranga)	Military Engineer 3rd rank Военинженер 3 ранга (Voeninzhener 3 ranga)	Intendant 3 rank Интендант 3 ранга (Intendant 3 ranga)	Military Medic 3rd rank / Military Veterinarian 3rd rank Военврач 3 ранга / Ветвоенврач 3 ранга (Voenvrach 3 ranga / Vetvoenvrach 3 ranga)	Military Jurist 3rd rank Военюрист 3 ранга (Voenyurist 3 ranga)
Senior Commanders (Старший командный и начальствующий состав)	Major; Майор (Mayor)	Captain, 3rd rank Капитан 3 ранга (Kapitan 3 ranga)	Battalion Commissar; Батальонный комиссар (Batalionniy komissar)	Military Engineer 2nd rank Военинженер 2 ранга (Voeninzhener 2 ranga)	Military Engineer 2nd rank Военинженер 2 ранга (Voeninzhener 2 ranga)	Intendant 2nd rank Интендант 2 ранга (Intendant 2 ranga)	Military Medic 2nd rank / Military Veterinarian 2nd rank Военврач 2 ранга / Ветвоенврач 2 ранга (Voenvrach 2 ranga / Vetvoenvrach 2 ranga)	Military Jurist 2nd rank Военюрист 2 ранга (Voenyurist 2 ranga)
Senior Commanders (Старший командный и начальствующий состав)	Colonel; Полковник (Polkovnik)	Captain, 1st rank Капитан 1 ранга (Kapitan 1 ranga)	Regimental Commissar; Полковой комиссар (Polkovoy komissar)	Military Engineer 1st rank Военинженер 1 ранга (Voeninzhener 1 ranga)	Military Engineer 1st rank Военинженер 1 ранга (Voeninzhener 1 ranga)	Intendant 1st rank Интендант 1 ранга (Intendant 1 ranga)	Military Medic 1st rank / Military Veterinarian 1st rank Военврач 1 ранга / Ветвоенврач 1 ранга (Voenvrach 1 ranga / Vetvoenvrach 1 ranga)	Military Jurist 1st rank Военюрист 1 ранга (Voenyurist 1 ranga)
Supreme Commanders (Высший командный и начальствующий состав)	Combrig; Комбриг (Kombrig)	Flag officer 2nd rank Флагман 2 ранга (Flagman 2 ranga)	Brigade Commissar; Бригадный комиссар (Brigadniy komissar)	Brigengineer; Бригинженер (Briginzhener)	Engineer-Flag officer 3rd rank Инженер-флагман 3 ранга (Inzhener-flagman 3 ranga)	Brigintendant; Бригинтендант (Brigintendant)	Brigade Medic / Brigade Veterinarian; Бригврач/Ветбригврач (Brigvrach/Vetbrigvrach)	Brigade Military Jurist; Бригвоенюрист (Brigvoenyurist)
Supreme Commanders (Высший командный и начальствующий состав)	Comdiv; Комдив (Komdiv)	Flag officer 1st rank Флагман 1 ранга (Flagman 1 ranga)	Divisional Commissar; Дивизионный комиссар (Divizionniy komissar)	Divengineer; Дивинженер (Divinzhener)	Engineer-Flag officer 2nd rank Инженер-флагман 2 ранга (Inzhener-flagman 2 ranga)	Divintendant; Дивинтендант (Divintendant)	Divisional Medic / Divisional Veterinarian; Дивврач/Ветдивврач (Divvrach/Vetdivvrach)	Divisional Military Jurist; Диввоенюрист (Divvoenyurist)
Supreme Commanders (Высший командный и начальствующий состав)	Comcor; Комкор (Komkor)	Fleet Flag officer 2nd rank Флагман флота 2 ранга (Flagman flota 2 ranga)	Corps Commissar; Корпусной комиссар (Korpusnoy komissar)	Corengineer; Коринженер (Korinzhener)	Engineer-Flag officer 1st rank Инженер-флагман 1 ранга (Inzhener-flagman 1 ranga)	Corintendant; Коринтендант (Korintendant)	Corps Medic / Corps Veterinarian; Корврач/Веткорврач (Korvrach/Vetkorvrach)	Corps Military Jurist; Корвоенюрист (Korvoenyurist)
Supreme Commanders (Высший командный и начальствующий состав)	2nd rank Commandarm; Командарм 2 ранга (Komandarm 2 ranga)	Fleet Flag officer 1st rank Флагман флота 1 ранга (Flagman flota 1 ranga)	2nd Rank Army Commissar; Армейский комиссар 2 ранга (Armeyskiy komissar 2 ranga)	Armengineer; Арминженер (Arminzhener)	Fleet Engineer-Flag officer Инженер-флагман флота (Inzhener-flagman flota)	Armintendant; Арминтендант (Armintendant)	Army Medic / Army Veterinarian; Армврач/Ветармврач (Armvrach/Vetarmvrach)	Army Military Jurist; Армвоенюрист (Armvoenyurist)
Supreme Commanders (Высший командный и начальствующий состав)	1st rank Commandarm; Командарм 1 ранга (Komandarm 1 ranga)	Fleet Flag officer 1st rank Флагман флота 1 ранга (Flagman flota 1 ranga)	1st Rank Army Commissar; Армейский комиссар 1 ранга (Armeyskiy komissar 1 ranga)	No equivalent	No equivalent	No equivalent	No equivalent	No equivalent
Supreme Commanders (Высший командный и начальствующий состав)	Marshal of the Soviet Union; Маршал Советского Союза (Marshal Sovietskovo Soyuza)	No equivalent		No equivalent	No equivalent	No equivalent	No equivalent	No equivalent

Ranks of junior lieutenant and junior military technician were introduced in 1937. Also restored were most of the military officer ranks in the Army and Navy, except for the general officer ranks and the admiral officer ranks, with the naval rank of 3rd-class captain being the new officer rank introduced.

=== 1940–1943 ===
General ranks were restored in May 1940. The new ranks were based on the military ranks of the Russian Empire, although they underwent some modifications; modified Imperial rank insignia were reintroduced in 1943. The new ranks also abolished the specialist ranks for the other arms and services, and they were replaced by the new ranks with the service name attached.

Categories	Ranks							
Categories	Privates & Commanders		Political staff	Technical staff		Administrative staff	Medical (Vet) staff	Juristical staff
Categories	Ground and Air Forces	Naval Forces	Political staff	Ground and Air Forces	Naval Forces	Administrative staff	Medical (Vet) staff	Juristical staff
Privates (Рядовой состав)	Redarmyman; Красноармеец (Krasnoarmeyets)	Redfleetman; Краснофлотец (Krasnoflotets)	No equivalent	No equivalent	No equivalent	No equivalent	No equivalent	No equivalent
Privates (Рядовой состав)	Efreitor; Ефрейтор (Yefreytor)	Senior Redfleetman; Старший краснофлотец (Starshiy krasnoflotets)	No equivalent	No equivalent	No equivalent	No equivalent	No equivalent	No equivalent
Junior Сommanders (Младший командный и начальствующий состав)	Junior Sergeant; Младший сержант (Mladshy serzhant)	Starshina 2nd rank Старшина 2 статьи (Starshina 2 stat'i)	No equivalent	No equivalent	No equivalent	No equivalent	No equivalent	No equivalent
Junior Сommanders (Младший командный и начальствующий состав)	Sergeant; Сержант (Serzhant)	Starshina 1st rank Старшина 1 статьи (Starshina 1 stat'i)	No equivalent	No equivalent	No equivalent	No equivalent	No equivalent	No equivalent
Junior Сommanders (Младший командный и начальствующий состав)	Senior Sergeant; Старший сержант (Starshy serzhant)	Chief Starshina; Главный старшина (Glavny starshina)	No equivalent	No equivalent	No equivalent	No equivalent	No equivalent	No equivalent
Junior Сommanders (Младший командный и начальствующий состав)	Starshina; Старшина (Starshina)	Michman; Мичман	No equivalent	No equivalent	No equivalent	No equivalent	No equivalent	No equivalent
Middleweight Commanders (Средний командный и начальствующий состав)	Junior Lieutenant; Младший лейтенант (Mladshy leytenant)	Junior Lieutenant; Младший лейтенант (Mladshy leytenant)	No equivalent	Junior Military Technician; Младший воентехник (Mladshy voentekhnik)	Junior Military Technician; Младший воентехник (Mladshy voentekhnik)	No equivalent	No equivalent	No equivalent
Middleweight Commanders (Средний командный и начальствующий состав)	Lieutenant; Лейтенант (Leytenant)	Lieutenant; Лейтенант (Leytenant)	Junior Politruk; Младший политрук (Mladshy politruk)	Military Technician 2nd rank Воентехник 2 ранга (Voentehnik 2 ranga)	Military Technician 2nd rank Воентехник 2 ранга (Voentekhnik 2 ranga)	Technician-Intendant 2nd rank Техник-интендант 2 ранга (Tehknik-intendant 2 ranga)	Military Feldscher / Military Vet Feldscher; Военфельдшер/ветвоенфельдшер (Voenfeldsher/vetvoenfeldsher)	Junior Military Jurist; Младший военюрист (Mladshy voenyurist)
Middleweight Commanders (Средний командный и начальствующий состав)	Senior Lieutenant; Старший лейтенант (Starshy leytenant)	Senior Lieutenant; Старший лейтенант (Starshy leytenant)	Politruk; Политрук (Politruk)	Military Technician 1st rank Воентехник 1 ранга (Voentehnik 1 ranga)	Military Technician 1st rank Воентехник 1 ранга (Voentehnik 1 ranga)	Technician-Intendant 1st rank Техник-интендант 1 ранга (Tehnik-intendant 1 ranga)	Senior Military Feldscher / Senior Military Vet Feldscher; Старший военфельдшер / Старший ветвоенфельдшер (Starshiy voenfeldsher/Starshiy vetvoenfeldsher)	Military Jurist; Военюрист (Voenyurist)
Senior Commanders (Старший командный и начальствующий состав)	Captain; Капитан (Kapitan)	Captain-Lieutenant; Капитан-лейтенант (Kapitan-leytenant)	Senior Politruk; Старший политрук (Starshiy politruk)	Military Engineer 3rd rank Военинженер 3 ранга (Voeninzhener 3 ranga)	Military Engineer 3rd rank Военинженер 3 ранга (Voeninzhener 3 ranga)	Intendant 3rd rank Интендант 3 ранга (Intendant 3 ranga)	Military Medic 3rd rank / Military Veterinarian 3 rank Военврач 3 ранга / Ветвоенврач 3 ранга (Voenvrach 3 ranga / Vetvoenvrach 3 ranga)	Military Jurist 3rd rank Военюрист 3 ранга (Voenyurist 3 ranga)
Senior Commanders (Старший командный и начальствующий состав)	Major; Майор (Mayor)	Captain, 3rd rank Капитан 3 ранга (Kapitan 3 ranga)	Battalion Commissar; Батальонный комиссар (Batalionniy komissar)	Military Engineer 2nd rank Военинженер 2 ранга (Voeninzhener 2 ranga)	Military Engineer 2nd rank Военинженер 2 ранга (Voeninzhener 2 ranga)	Intendant 2 rank Интендант 2 ранга (Intendant 2 ranga)	Military Medic 2nd rank / Military Veterinarian 2 rank Военврач 2 ранга / Ветвоенврач 2 ранга (Voenvrach 2 ranga / Vetvoenvrach 2 ranga)	Military Jurist 2nd rank Военюрист 2 ранга (Voenyurist 2 ranga)
Senior Commanders (Старший командный и начальствующий состав)	Lieutenant Colonel; Подполковник (Podpolkovnik)	Captain, 2nd rank Капитан 2 ранга (Kapitan 2 ranga)	Senior Battalion Commissar; Старший батальонный комиссар (Starshiy batalionniy komissar)	Military Engineer 1st rank Военинженер 1 ранга (Voeninzhener 1 ranga)	Military Engineer 1st rank Военинженер 1 ранга (Voeninzhener 1 ranga)	Intendant 1 rank Интендант 1 ранга (Intendant 1 ranga)	Military Medic 1st rank / Military Veterinarian 1 rank Военврач 1 ранга / Ветвоенврач 1 ранга (Voenvrach 1 ranga / Vetvoenvrach 1 ranga)	Military Jurist 1st rank Военюрист 1 ранга (Voenyurist 1 ranga)
Senior Commanders (Старший командный и начальствующий состав)	Colonel; Полковник (Polkovnik)	Captain, 1st rank Капитан 1 ранга (Kapitan 1 ranga)	Regimental Commissar; Полковой комиссар (Polkovoy komissar)	No equivalent	No equivalent	No equivalent	No equivalent	No equivalent
Supreme Commanders (Высший командный и начальствующий состав)	General-Major; Генерал-майор (General-mayor)	Counter-Admiral; Контр-адмирал (Kontr-admiral)	Divisional Commissar; Дивизионный комиссар (Divizionniy komissar)	Divengineer; Дивинженер (Divinzhener)	Engineer-Flag officer 2nd rank Инженер-флагман 2 ранга (Inzhener-flagman 2 ranga)	Divintendant; Дивинтендант (Divintendant)	Divisional Medic / Divisional Veterinarian; Дивврач/Ветдивврач (Divvrach/Vetdivvrach)	Divisional Military Jurist; Диввоенюрист (Divvoenyurist)
Supreme Commanders (Высший командный и начальствующий состав)	General-Lieutenant; Генерал-лейтенант (General-leytenant)	Vice-Admiral; Вице-адмирал (Vitse-admiral)	Corps Commissar; Корпусной комиссар (Korpusnoy komissar)	Corengineer; Коринженер (Korinzhener)	Engineer-Flag officer 1st rank Инженер-флагман 1 ранга (Inzhener-flagman 1 ranga)	Corintendant; Коринтендант (Korintendant)	Corps Medic / Corps Veterinarian; Корврач/Веткорврач (Korvrach/Vetkorvrach)	Corps Military Jurist; Корвоенюрист (Korvoenyurist)
Supreme Commanders (Высший командный и начальствующий состав)	General-Colonel; Генерал-полковник (General-polkovnik)	Admiral; Адмирал (Admiral)	Army Commissar 2nd rank Армейский комиссар 2 ранга (Armeyskiy komissar 2 ranga)	Armengineer; Арминженер (Arminzhener)	Fleet Engineer-Flag Officer; Инженер-флагман флота (Inzhener-flagman flota)	Armintendant; Арминтендант (Armintendant)	Army Medic / Army Veterinarian; Армврач/Ветармврач (Armvrach/Vetarmvrach)	Army Military Jurist; Армвоенюрист (Armvoenyurist)
Supreme Commanders (Высший командный и начальствующий состав)	General of the Army; Генерал армии (General armii)	Admiral of the Fleet; Адмирал флота (Admiral flota)	Army Commissar 1st rank Армейский комиссар 1 ранга (Armeyskiy komissar 1 ranga)	No equivalent	No equivalent	No equivalent	No equivalent	No equivalent
Supreme Commanders (Высший командный и начальствующий состав)	Marshal of the Soviet Union; Маршал Советского Союза (Marshal Sovietskovo Soyuza)	No equivalent		No equivalent	No equivalent	No equivalent	No equivalent	No equivalent

Ranks "lieutenant colonel" and "senior battalion commissar" were introduced in 1937. By 1940 the Army rank of corporal and the Naval rank of midshipman were revived, and the old rank of junior sergeant was reinstated into its modern form (the rank is from the Estonian Army but has a Russian origin in the Imperial Russian Army).

In 1942, the political commissars' service in the Red Army was finally disbanded for good, and its ranks dissolved.

=== 1943–1991 ===
In 1943, all ranks became standardized throughout the Soviet Armed Forces, with the full inclusion of Air/Arm/Branch Marshal and Air/Arm/Branch chief marshal ranks. All specialist ranks remaining were replaced by the 1940 standard ranks with the service name attached to them, and private and deaman became the basic enlisted ranks. The new Imperial Russian Armed Forces-style shoulder rank insignia also debuted.

From 1943 to 1961, naval ranks were adjusted to match the naval ranks of other countries. The rank of Admiral of the Fleet was introduced during the Great Patriotic War and was the equivalent rank to Marshal of the Soviet Union in 1955; it was renamed Admiral of the Fleet of the Soviet Union. The rank was soon revived in 1962 as a general of the Army-equivalent rank in compliance with new Soviet Navy regulations for officers.

On June 27, 1945, the rank of Generalissimus Sovietskogo Soyuza (Generalissimo of the Soviet Union) was created and granted to Joseph Stalin following the tradition of the Russian Imperial Army which granted to the Tsars the military rank in their capacity as Commanders-in-Chief. Formally it existed until 1993 but it was never used after Stalin's death.

In the 1970s, the non-commissioned officers serving under contract and holding Starshina (Master Sergeant) rank were reassigned to newly created Praporshchik rank (not to be confused with similarly named Russian Empire rank of commissioned officers); starshina was reserved for conscripts only. In the Soviet Navy, however, as the Midshipman rank was formally elevated to that of a warrant officer, the NCO role of Midshipmen was replaced by the new rank of Ship Chief Master Sergeant as a result of the naval rank change. At the same time all rank insignia became uniform for the Army and Air Force plus the other services, the Navy retained theirs.

Generals of the Army and admirals soon had their insignia changed in 1974.

The final change was in 1981 when senior praporshchik and senior midshipman ranks were added to the ranks of warrant officers.

The table of Soviet military ranks can be seen in military ranks of the Soviet Union or in the section below (as they were the same as the present military ranks of the Russian Federation).

== Russian Federation ==
The independent Russia inherited the ranks of the Soviet Union, although the insignia and uniforms were altered a little. The following is a table of ranks of the Armed Forces of the Russian Federation.

Russian armed forces have two styles of ranks: deck ranks (navy style ranks) and troop ranks (army and other forces style ranks). The following table of Ranks is based on those of the Russian Federation.

Troop ranks are used by:

- Ministry of Defence
  - Ground Forces (Army)
  - Aerospace Forces
  - Navy — Naval Infantry (Marines), Naval Aviation other various shore services of the navy
  - Special Operations Forces (Spetsnaz)
  - Strategic Importance Missile Troops (Independent Corps)
  - Airborne Troops (Independent Corps)
  - Federal Agency of Special Construction
  - Railway Troops of the Russian Federation
  - Rear of the Armed Forces of the Russian Federation
- Ministry of Internal Affairs (MVD)
  - Police, formerly Militia
- National Guard of Russia
  - National Guard Forces Command
- Federal Security Service (FSB) and
  - Border Service of the FSB
- Federal Protective Service (FSO)
- Foreign Intelligence Service (SVR)
- Chief directorate of special programs of the president
- Ministry of Emergency Situations (EMERCOM)
  - Civil Defense Troops
  - Military personnel of the Russian State Fire Service

Deck (Navy) ranks are used by:

- Ministry of Defence
  - Navy — deck personnel
- Federal Security Service
  - Coast Guard of the Border Service of FSB
- National Guard
  - National Guard Naval Service Corps

The highest troop rank is Marshal of the Russian Federation.

The highest Navy 'deck' rank is Admiral of the Fleet. In the Soviet era the rank Admiral of the Fleet of the Soviet Union was equivalent to the rank of marshal and only three persons were given that rank. Since 1991 this rank is no longer used.

Ranks can have additional descriptors according to assignment or status. For example, the rank of a serviceman of a "Guards" unit, formation, or ship may be followed by the word "Guards" ("Gefreitor of Guards"); the rank of a serviceman of the legal, medical, or veterinary professions is followed by "of Justice", "of the Medical service", or "of the Veterinary service" ("Captain of the Medical Service"); and the rank of a reserve or retired serviceman is followed by the words “Reserve” or “Retired,” respectively ("Major of Reserve"). The Russian Federation abolished the descriptor "of Aviation" for pilots, however, that descriptor is still in common use.

Category	Troop Ranks			Deck Ranks		
Category	Ground Forces Insignia	Rank Name	Aerospace Forces Insignia	Naval Shoulder Insignia	Rank Name	Naval Sleeve Insignia
Supreme Officers, General Officers		Marshal of the Russian Federation (currently inactive); Ма́ршал Росси́йской Федера́ции				
Supreme Officers, General Officers		General of the Army генера́л а́рмии			Admiral of the Fleet адмира́л фло́та	
Supreme Officers, General Officers		General-Colonel генера́л-полко́вник			Admiral адмира́л	
Supreme Officers, General Officers		General-Lieutenant генера́л-лейтена́нт			Vice Admiral (Rear Admiral upper half) ви́це-адмира́л	
Supreme Officers, General Officers		General-Major генера́л-майо́р			Counter Admiral (Rear Admiral lower half) ко́нтр-адмира́л	
Senior Officers, Field Grade Officers		Polkovnik (Colonel) полко́вник			Captain, 1st rank капита́н 1-го ра́нга	
Senior Officers, Field Grade Officers		Podpolkovnik (Lieutenant Colonel) подполко́вник			Captain, 2nd rank капита́н 2-го р́анга	
Senior Officers, Field Grade Officers		Major майо́р			Captain, 3rd rank капита́н 3-го р́анга	
Junior Officers, Company Grade Officers		Captain капита́н			Captain-Lieutenant капита́н-лейтена́нт	
Junior Officers, Company Grade Officers		Senior Lieutenant ста́рший лейтена́нт			Senior Lieutenant ста́рший лейтена́нт	
Junior Officers, Company Grade Officers		Lieutenant лейтена́нт			Lieutenant лейтена́нт	
Junior Officers, Company Grade Officers		Junior Lieutenant мла́дший лейтена́нт			Junior Lieutenant мла́дший лейтена́нт	
Under-Officers, Master Non-Commissioned Officers		Senior Praporshchik (Senior Warrant Officer) ста́рший пра́порщик			Senior Midshipman (Senior Warrant Officer) ста́рший ми́чман	no sleeve insignia
Under-Officers, Master Non-Commissioned Officers		Praporshchik (Warrant Officer) пра́порщик			Midshipman (Warrant Officer) ми́чман	no sleeve insignia
Sergeants, Petty Officers		Starshina (Sergeant Major) старшина́			Chief Ship Starshina (Chief petty officer) гла́вный корабе́льный старшина́	no sleeve insignia
Sergeants, Petty Officers		Senior Sergeant ста́рший сержа́нт			Chief petty officer гла́вный старшина́	no sleeve insignia
Sergeants, Petty Officers		Sergeant сержа́нт			Petty Officer, 1st class старшина́ 1-й статьи́	no sleeve insignia
Sergeants, Petty Officers		Junior Sergeant мла́дший сержа́нт			Petty Officer, 2nd class старшина́ 2-й статьи́	no sleeve insignia
Soldiers, Seamen, Airmen		Efreitor ефре́йтор			Senior Seaman (Matros) ста́рший матро́с	no sleeve insignia
Soldiers, Seamen, Airmen		Private рядово́й			Seaman (Matros) матро́с	no sleeve insignia

Note: the descriptor "of Aviation" has been officially abolished but usage is still common within the Air Force and Naval Aviation.

On March 11, 2010, by Law No.2010-293 of the President of Russia, a new set of rank insignia debuted. Privates, Airmen, and Seamen sport plain shoulder epaulets and the chevrons are removed for the ranks of senior NCOs and are now replaced by plain bars (small horizontal from Corporal/Senior Airman/Leading Seaman to Sergeant/Staff Sergeant/Petty Officer increasing by seniority, large horizontal for Staff Sergeants, Flight Sergeants, and Chief Petty Officers, and vertical bars for petty officers and Ship CPOs).

WO's and Officer ranks received updated shoulder rank epaulets (and for the Navy, cuff rank insignia), and all General Officer and Flag Officer rank insignia now reflecting service affiliation in the duty dress uniform (the old pattern epaulets were replaced by the army green, aerospace forces blue and navy blue epaulets (duty dress depending on service) and gold (parade dress) epaulets similar to those used in the mid-1970s by the Soviet Armed Forces). This was also the case for the marshal of the Russian Federation rank epaulet, which still retained the Coat of arms of Russia and the Marshal's Star. But this change is now evident in the battle dress and duty uniforms only, in the new 2008 dress uniforms the change is evident in the enlisted and NCO epaulets, but in the epaulets of all warrant officers and officers, the gold and black epaulets stayed as is in the dress uniforms.

As part of the 2008 Russian military reform, the Praporshchik (Warrant Officer) rank was effectively abolished in the Russian Armed Forces, though the rank still may be used in other uniformed services of the government such as the Interior Ministry, the Police, The Ministry of Emergency Situations and the Border Guard Service.

The general and flag officer ranks changed again on February 22, 2013. Thus, for Generals of the Army and Fleet Admirals, instead of sporting 4 stars, the shoulder rank insignia for both were changed back to the Marshal's Star with additional emblems for Generals of the Army and Fleet Admiral's Star for Fleet Admirals. Some retired generals and flag officers were spotted wearing the old pre-1994 rank insignia instead of the new.

== See also ==
- List of comparative military ranks
- Military ranks of the Soviet Union
- Military ranks, special ranks and class rates in Russia
- Rank insignia of the Russian Police
- Russian Armed Forces
- Russia
