= 61 =

61 may refer to:

- 61 (number), the natural number following 60 and preceding 62.
- one of the years 61 BC, AD 61, 1961, 2061.
- In some countries, a slang name for the Cyrillic letter Ы.
- 61*, a 2001 American sports drama film.
- "Sixty One", a song by Karma to Burn from the album Mountain Czar, 2016.
- 61 Danaë, a main-belt asteroid.
- The international calling code for Australia.
- 61 (meme), a variant of the 6-7 meme by Spartan Swat also known as the 61 guy.

== See also ==
- 61st (disambiguation)
- List of highways numbered 61
