= LXI Reserve Corps =

The LXI Reserve Corps (German: LXI. Reservekorps), was an army corps of the German Wehrmacht during World War II. The formation was active between September 1942 and February 1944.

== History ==
The LXI Reserve Corps was formed on 15 September 1942 in Wehrkreis I (Königsberg).
It was stationed in Reichskommissariat Ostland and was subordinate to the Wehrmachtsbefehlshaber Ostland (Walter Braemer).

It consisted of the 141st and the 151st Reserve Divisions.
Its commander was General der Artillerie Edgar Theißen.

== Source ==
- "LXI. Reservekorps (61.)". Lexikon der Wehrmacht.
