= 61st Division =

In military terms, 61st Division or 61st Infantry Division may refer to:

== Infantry divisions ==
- 61st Infantry Division (France)
- 61st Infantry Division (Wehrmacht), Germany
- 61st Infantry Division "Sirte", Kingdom of Italy
- 61st Division (Imperial Japanese Army)
- 61st Division (Philippines)
- 61st Infantry Division (Russian Empire)
- 61st Guards Rifle Division, Soviet Union
- 61st Motor Rifle Division, Soviet Union
- 61st Mechanized Division, Soviet Union
- 61st (2nd South Midland) Division, United Kingdom
- 61st Infantry Division (United Kingdom)
- 61st Infantry Division (United States), planned WWII division but never formed

== Cavalry divisions ==
- 61st Cavalry Division (Soviet Union)
- 61st Cavalry Division (United States)

== See also ==
- List of military divisions by number
- 61st Brigade (disambiguation)
- 61st Regiment (disambiguation)
- 61st Squadron (disambiguation)
