= Flight 611 =

Flight 611 may refer to:

- United Air Lines Flight 611, first incident involving the Boeing 737, failure during takeoff, 1970
- Southwest Air Lines Flight 611, landing accident, 1982 – pilot error, runway overrun
- China Airlines Flight 611, crashed 2002, with 225 deaths – poor repairs
- DHL Flight 611, in the Überlingen mid-air collision, 2002 – ATC shortcomings
- Air India Express Flight 611, tail strike and antenna collision on takeoff, 2018 – captain seat failure
