= 611 Place =

Skyscraper in Los Angeles, California, United States

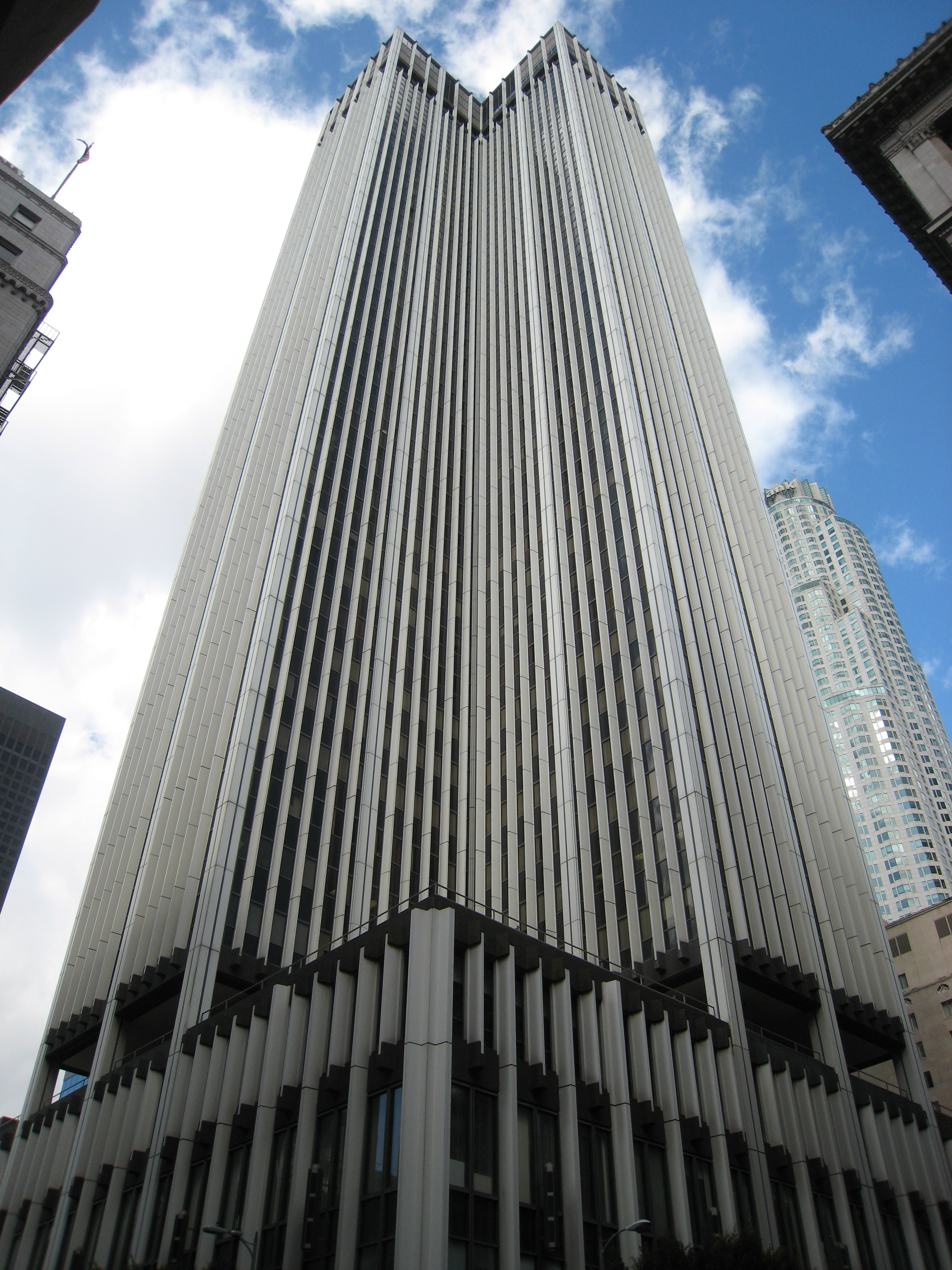

- Location within the Los Angeles metropolitan area 611 Place (California) 611 Place (the United States)
- Alternative names: 611 West 6th Street; AT&T Center; Crocker-Citizen Plaza

General information
- Type: Commercial offices
- Architectural style: Modernism
- Location: 611 West 6th Street; Los Angeles, California
- Coordinates: 34.04905°N 118.255619°W
- Construction started: 1967
- Completed: 1969

Height
- Roof: 189 m (620 ft)

Technical details
- Floor count: 42
- Floor area: 715,463 sq ft (66,468.7 m^{2})

Design and construction
- Architect: William L. Pereira & Associates
- Developer: Chetrit Group
- Structural engineer: Brandow & Johnston Inc
- Main contractor: Dinwiddie Construction

611 Place (displayed as AT&T CENTER) is a 42-story, 189 m (620 ft) skyscraper at 611 West 6th Street in Downtown Los Angeles, California, designed by William L. Pereira & Associates and completed in 1969. The building was commissioned by the now-defunct Crocker Citizen's Bank, and served as its Southern California headquarters until 1983, when it moved to Crocker Center, now Wells Fargo Center (Los Angeles). It was subsequently bought by AT&T. It was the tallest building in Los Angeles upon completion, and the first building to surpass Los Angeles City Hall in terms of structural height (many buildings had surpassed City Hall with decorative spires, the first being Richfield Tower). It consists of a cross-shaped tower clad in vertical aluminum beams, and supported on its west side by an immense, blank slab of concrete running the entire height of the building, which houses elevator and utility shafts and is used to display corporate logos. The building features a number of Pereira's design trademarks, including cleft vertical columns, grid patterned ceilings, and architectural lanterns fitted to the exterior.

The building was described in 2023 as "long-vacant." A 2007 plan to convert the building to condominiums did not move forward.

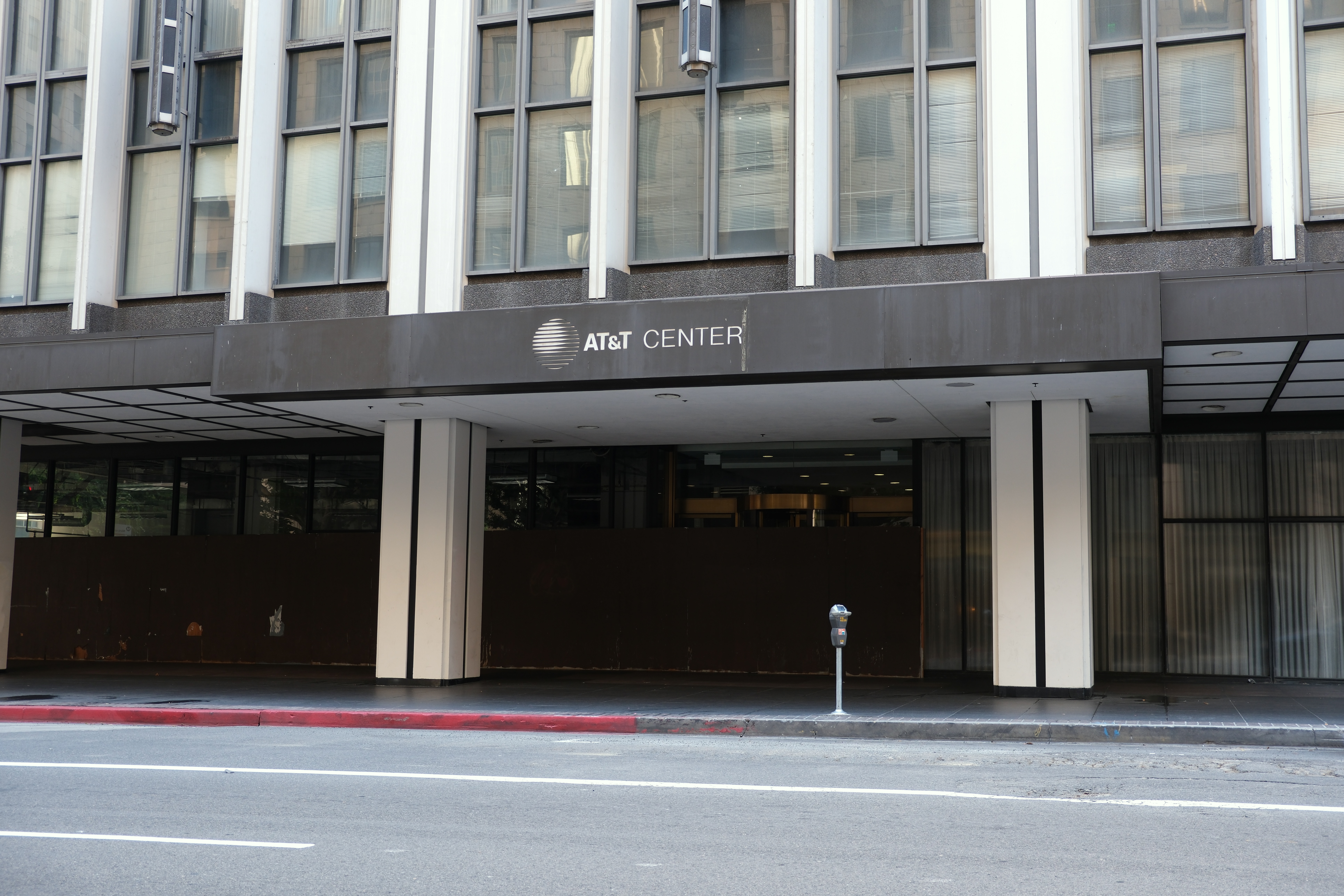
611 Place in December 2023 with AT&T Center Facade.

== In popular culture ==
The building has appeared in several movies and television series:

- The Elevator (1974), where it appeared as a skyscraper in which an elevator stalls and traps the occupants.
- Mr. Mom (1983), where it appeared as the location of the Richardson Advertising Agency.
- Uncommon Valor (1983), where it is featured as the Houston headquarters of an oil executive.
- Con Air (1997), the building be seen from an aerial view and street view as a dead body falls from an aircraft and lands on a car near the base of the building in the city of Fresno, California.
- Epicenter (2000), This building is destroyed by an earthquake in this movie.
- The Day After Tomorrow (2004), where it appeared in shots of Manhattan.
- Along Came Polly (2004), where it was the starting point of an ill-fated BASE jump.
- The Morning Show (2019 - 1st season, 2021 - 2nd season), where 611 Place is shown as UBA's headquarters.

== See also ==
- List of tallest buildings in Los Angeles
