= 61st Brigade =

61st Brigade may refer to:

== Bulgaria ==
- 61st Stryamska Mechanized Brigade

== Romania ==
- 61st Mountain Troops Brigade (Romania)

== Russia ==
- 61st Separate Guards Naval Infantry Brigade

== Spain ==
- 61st Mixed Brigade

== Ukraine ==
- 61st Mechanized Brigade (Ukraine)

== United Kingdom ==
- 61st Anti-Aircraft Brigade
- 61st Infantry Brigade (United Kingdom)

=== Artillery units ===
- 61st (Howitzer) Brigade, Royal Field Artillery in World War I
- 61st (Finsbury Rifles) Anti-Aircraft Brigade, Royal Artillery
- 61st (North Midland) Brigade, Royal Field Artillery after World War I
- 61st Carnarvon and Denbigh (Yeomanry) Medium Brigade, Royal Garrison Artillery

== See also ==
- 61st Division (disambiguation)
- 61st Regiment (disambiguation)
