= 61st Regiment =

61st Regiment or 61st Infantry Regiment may refer to:

- 61st Regiment of Foot (disambiguation), four British Army units carried this name
- 61st Pioneers, a unit of the British Indian Army, 1758-1922
- 61st Infantry Regiment (United States), a unit of the United States Army
- 61st Air Defense Artillery Regiment, a unit of the United States Army
- 61st Cavalry Regiment (United States), a unit of the United States Army
- 61st Anti-aircraft Missiles Regiment (Romania), a unit of the Romanian Land Forces
- 61st Cavalry (India), a unit of the Indian Army
- 61st Infantry Regiment (Finland), a unit of the Finnish Army, 1941–1944

American Civil War

Union (Northern) Army

- 61st Illinois Volunteer Infantry Regiment
- 61st Indiana Infantry Regiment
- 61st Ohio Infantry
- 61st New York Volunteer Infantry
- 61st Regiment Massachusetts Volunteer Infantry
- 61st Pennsylvania Infantry

Confederate (Southern) Army

- 61st Virginia Infantry
- 61st Georgia Volunteer Infantry

== See also ==
- 61st Infantry Regiment (disambiguation)
