= Comparative air force enlisted ranks of Africa =

Rank comparison of non-commissioned officers and enlisted personnel for air forces of African states.

== Other ranks ==
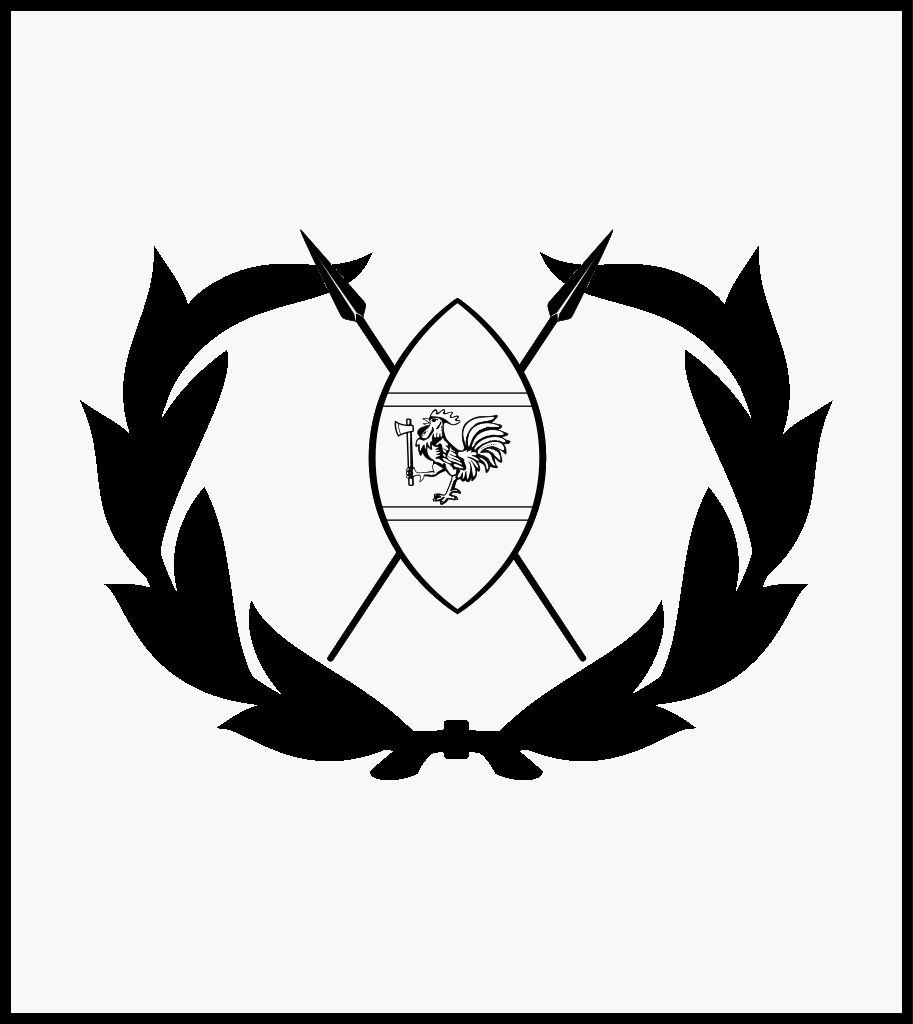
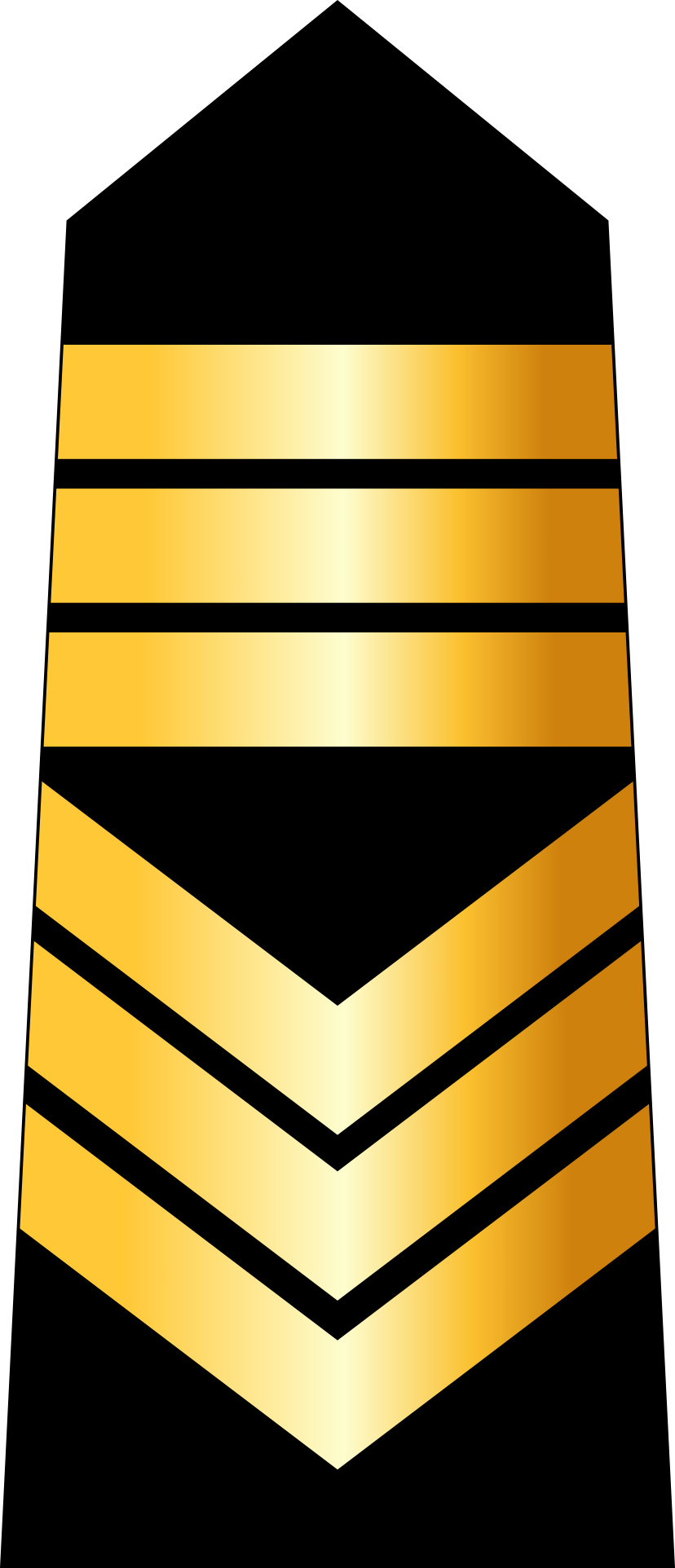
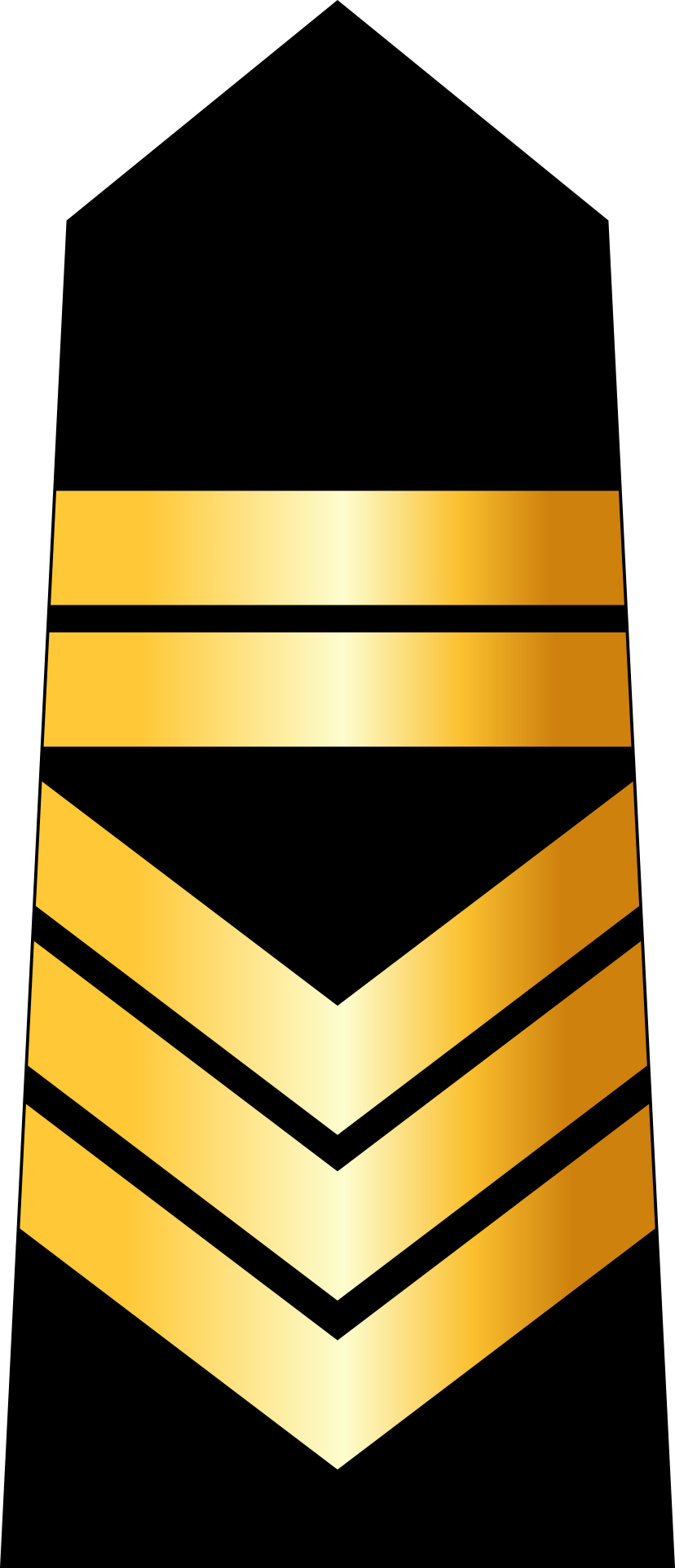
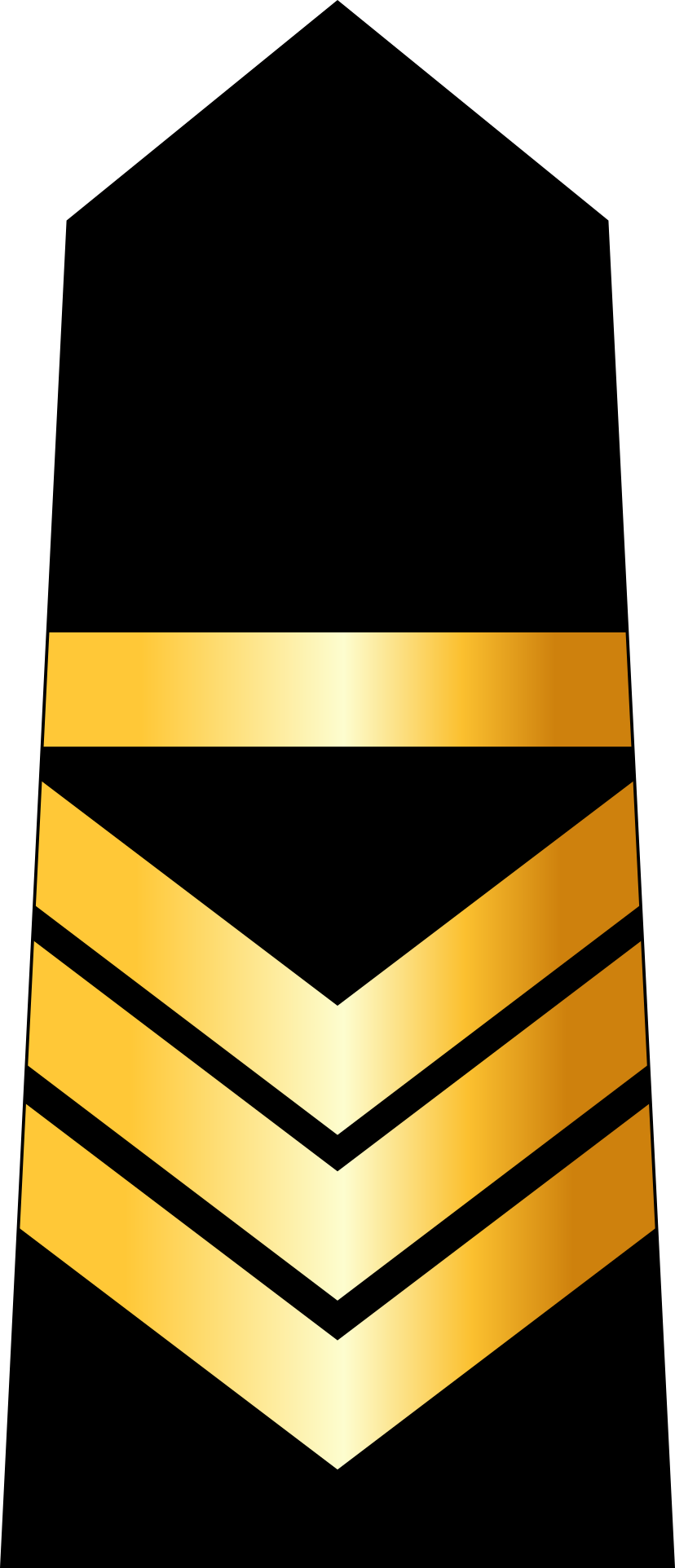
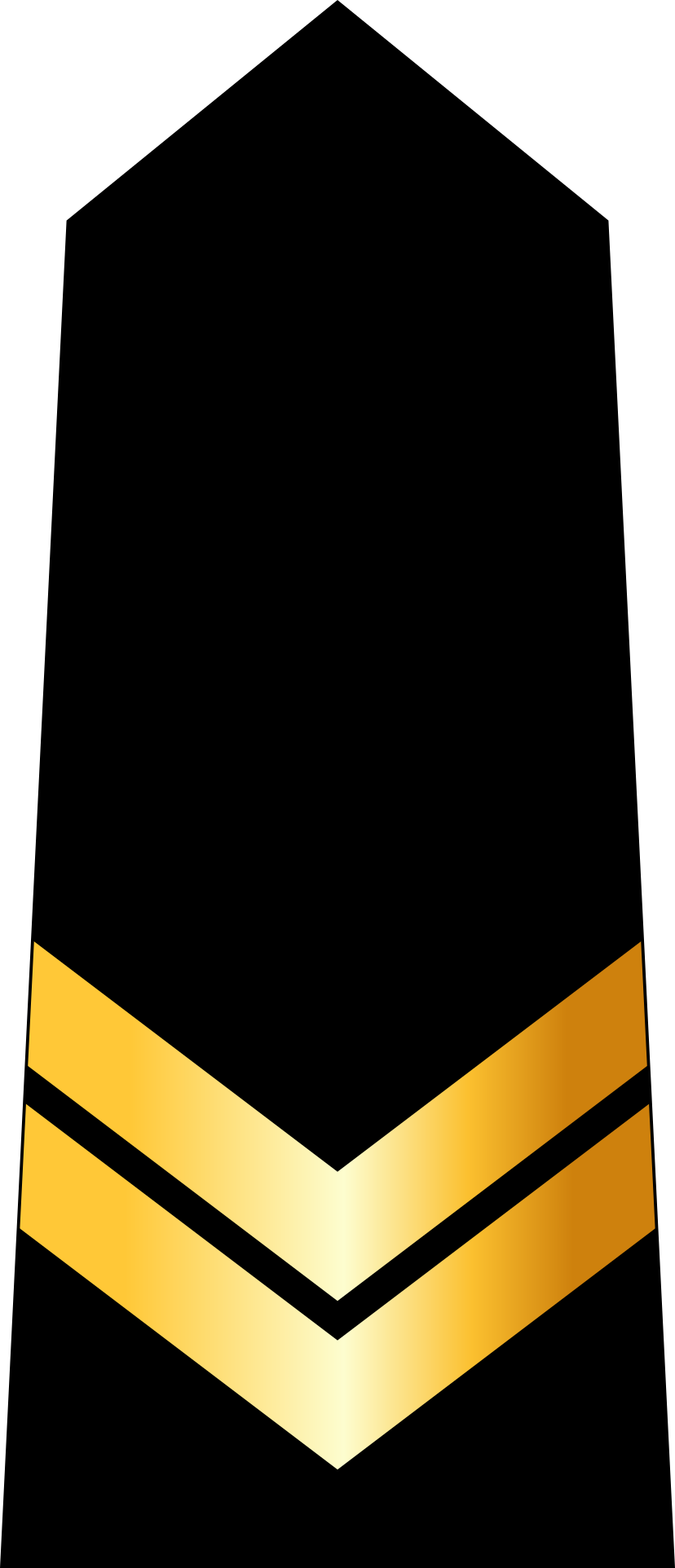
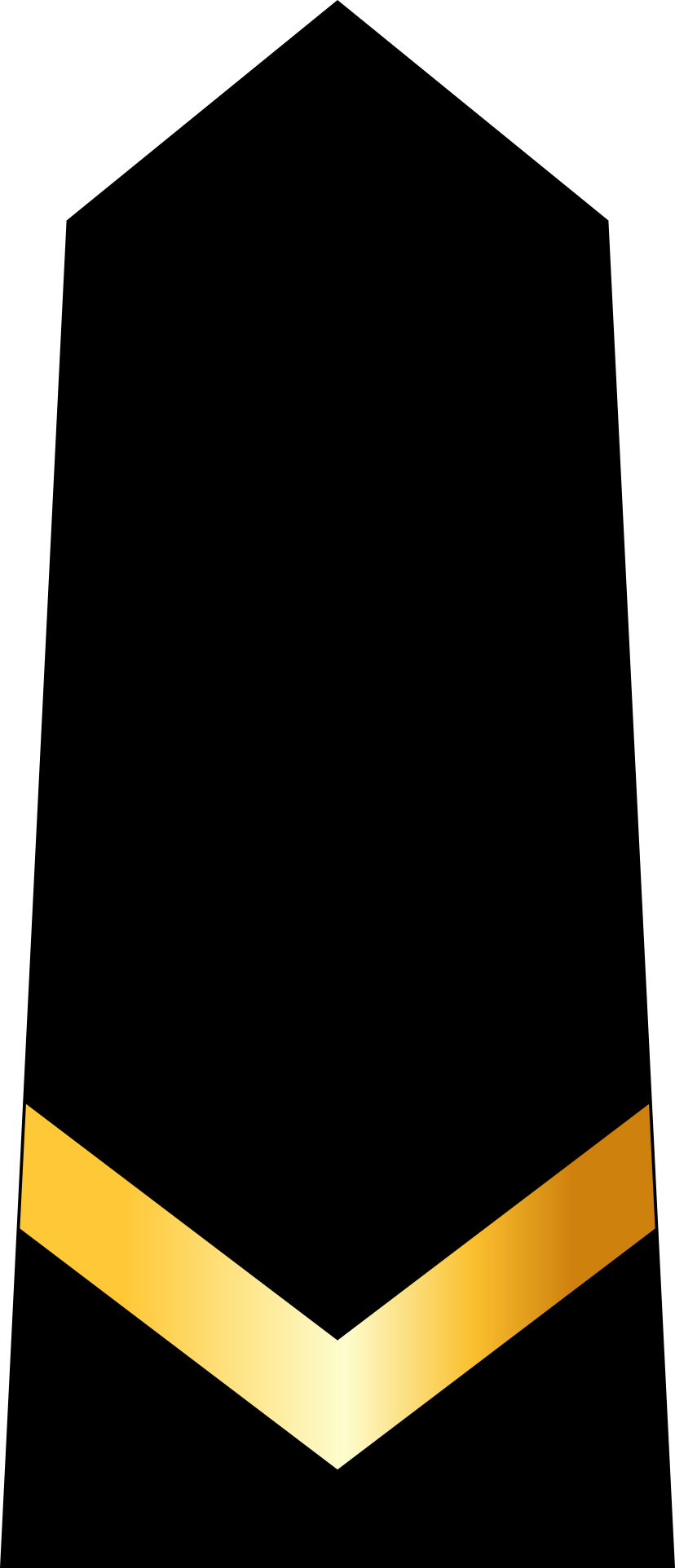
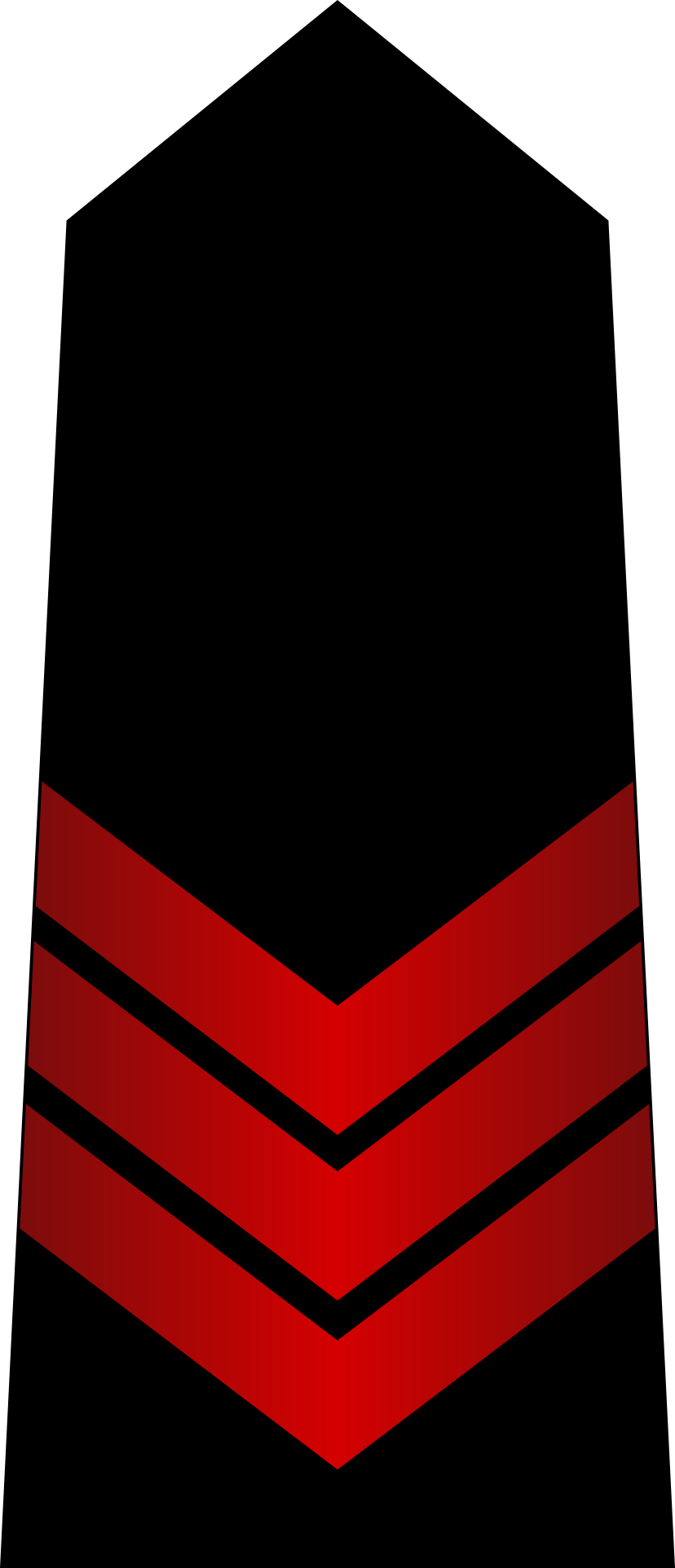
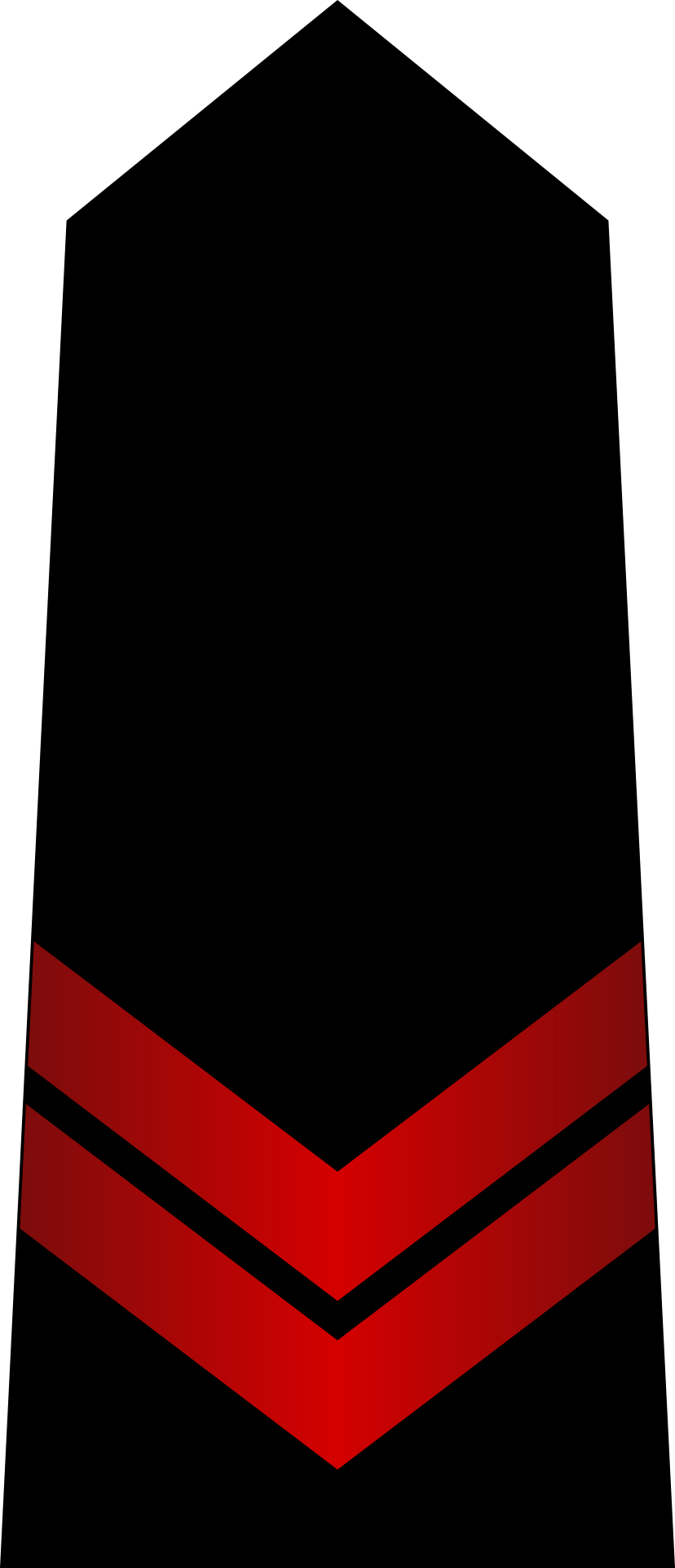
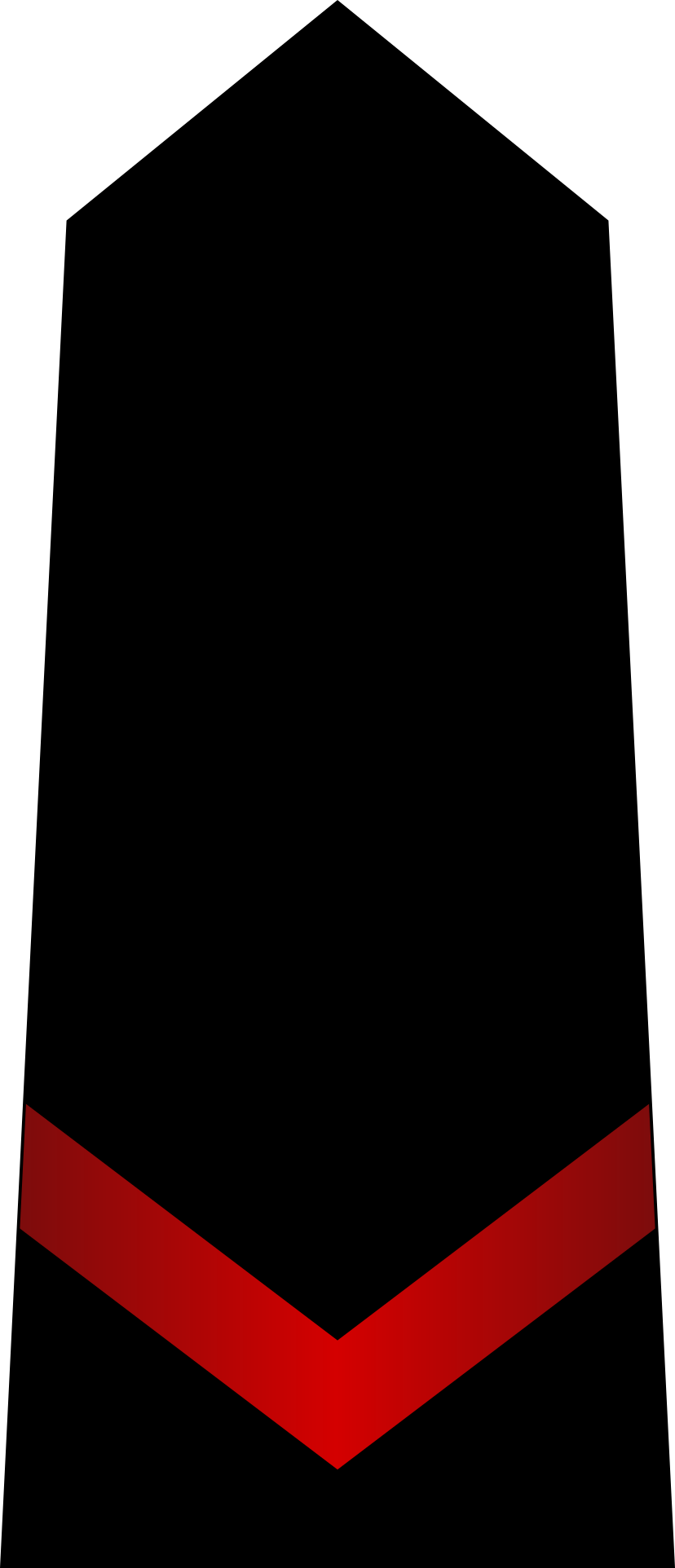
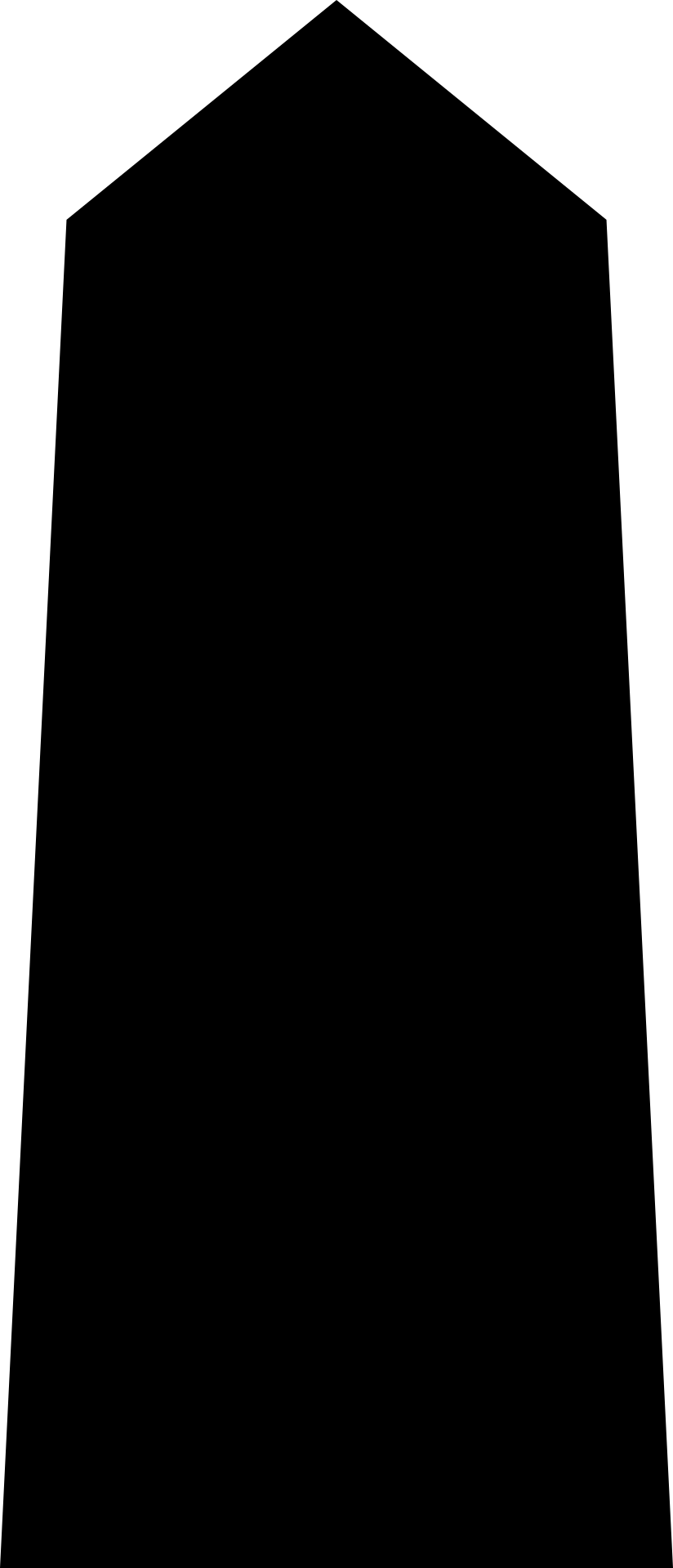
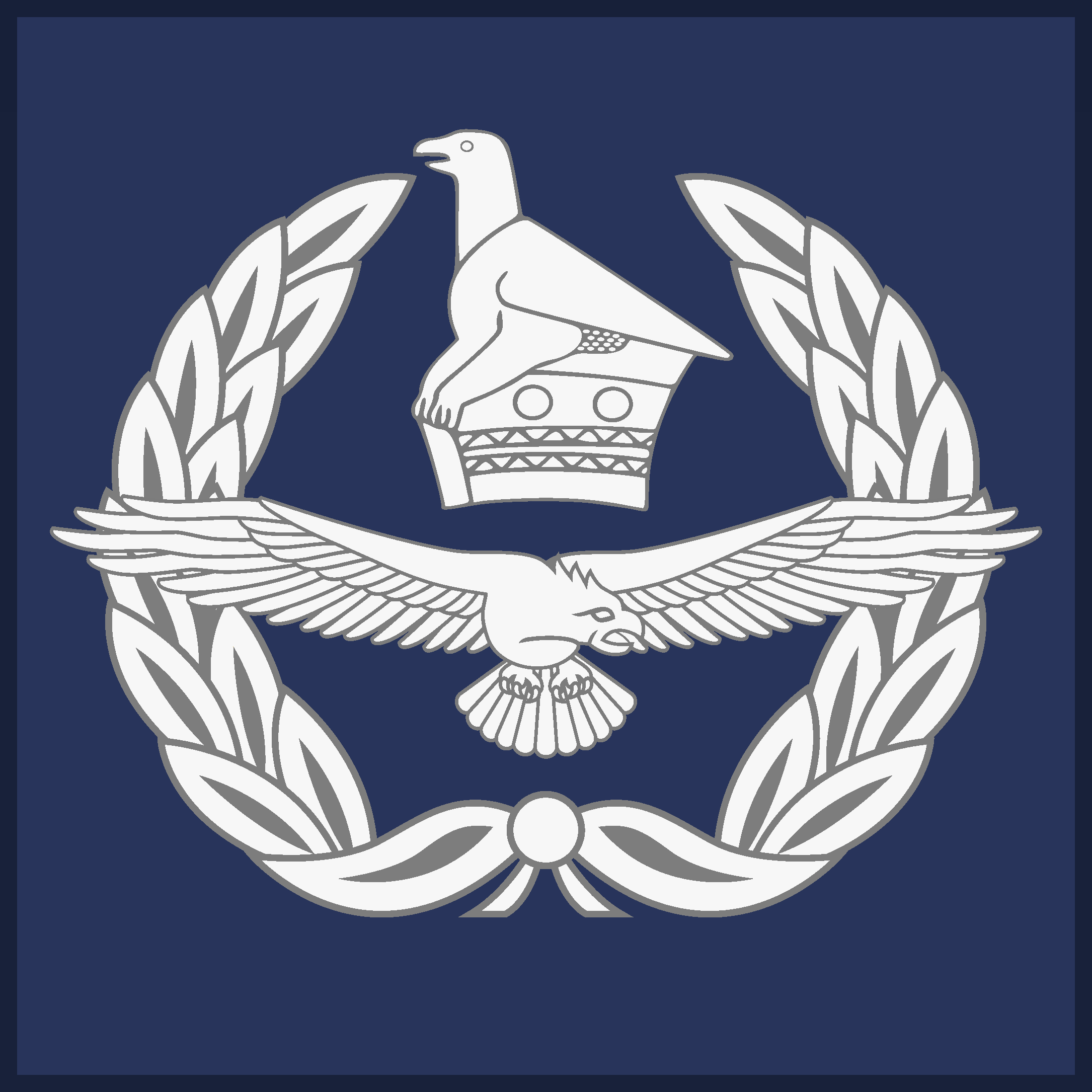
| Rank group | Senior NCOs | | | | | | | | Junior NCOs | | Enlisted |
|---|---|---|---|---|---|---|---|---|---|---|---|---|---|---|
| Algerian Air Force | | | | | | | | | | | | | No insignia |
| Algerian Air Force | مساعد أول; Mosa'id awwal | | مساعد; Mosa'id | | | | رقيب أول; Raqib awwal | رقيب; Raqib | عريف أول; Earif 'awal | عريف; Earif | | | جندي; Jundiun |
| Algerian Air Force | Adjudant chef | | Adjudant | | | | Sergent chef | Sergent | Caporal chef | Caporal | | | Djoundi |
| National Air Force of Angola | | | | | | | | | | | | | No insignia |
| National Air Force of Angola | Sargento-mor | | Sargento-chefe | | Sargento-ajudante | | Primeiro-sargento | Segundo-sargento | Sub-sargento | | Primeiro-cabo | Segundo-cabo | Soldado |
| Benin | No air force |
| Botswana Defence Force Air Wing | | | | | | | | | | | | | No insignia |
| Botswana Defence Force Air Wing | Warrant officer class 1 | | Warrant officer class 2 | | Staff sergeant | | Sergeant | | Corporal | Lance corporal | | | Private (or equivalent) |
| Burkina Faso Air Force | | | | | | | | | | | | | No insignia |
| Burkina Faso Air Force | Adjudant-chef major | Adjudant-chef | Adjudant | | | | Sergent-chef | Sergent | Caporal-chef | Caporal | Soldat de première classe | | Soldat de deuxeme classe |
| Burundi | No air force |
| Cameroon Air Force | | | | | | | | | | | | | No insignia |
| Cameroon Air Force | Adjudant-chef | | Adjudant | | | | Sergent-chef | Sergent | Caporal-chef | Caporal | Soldat première | | Soldat |
| Cape Verde | No air force |
| Central African Air Force | | | | | | | | | | | | | No insignia |
| Central African Air Force | Adjudant-chef | | Adjudant | | Sergent-major | | Sergent-chef | Sergent | Caporal-chef | Caporal | Soldat première | | Soldat |
| Chadian Air Force | | | | | | | | | | | | | No insignia |
| Chadian Air Force | | | | | Sergent major | | Sergent-chef | Sergent | | Caporal | Soldat première | | Soldat |
| Comoros | No air force |
| Air Force of the DR Congo | | | | | | | | | | | | | No insignia |
| Air Force of the DR Congo | Adjudant-chef | Adjudant de première classe | Adjudant | | Premier sergent major | Sergent major | Premier sergent | Sergent | | Caporal | Soldat de première classe | | Soldat de seconde classe | Recrue |
| Rank group | Senior NCOs | | | | | | | | Junior NCOs | | Enlisted |
| Congolese Air Force | | | | | | | | | | | | | No insignia |
| Congolese Air Force | Adjudant-chef | | Adjudant | | | | Sergent-chef | Sergent | Caporal-chef | Caporal | Soldat 1^{ère} classe | | Soldat 2^{e} classe |
| Djibouti Air Force |
| Djibouti Air Force | Adjudant-chef | | Adjudant | | | | Sergent-chef | Sergent | Caporal-chef | Caporal | Soldat première | | Soldat |
| Egyptian Air Force |
| Egyptian Air Force | مساعد أول; Mosa'id awwal | | مساعد; Mosa'id | | رقيب أول; Raqib awwal | | رقيب; Raqib | | عريف 'arif | | جندي; Jundi |
| Equatorial Guinea Air Force |
| Equatorial Guinea Air Force | | | Brigada | | Sargento primero | | Sarjento | | Cabo primero | Cabo | | | Soldado |
| (Eritrea) Eritrean Air Force | | | | | | | | | | | | | No insignia |
| (Eritrea) Eritrean Air Force | | | Master Sergeant | | | | Staff Sergeant | Sergeant | Corporal | | Private 1st Class | | Private |
| Ethiopian Air Force | | | | | | | | | | | | | No insignia |
| Ethiopian Air Force | ሲ ዋራንት ኦፊሰር; Sī waraniti ofīseri | ጁኝር ዋራንት ኦፊሰር; Junyiri waraniti ofīseri | ሻለቃ ባሻ; Shalek’a basha | | ሻለቃ መጋቢ ባሻ; Shalek’a megabī basha | | ሻምበል ባሻ; Shamibeli basha | መጋቢ ሃምሳ አለቃ; Megabī hamisa ālek’a | ሃምሳ አለቃ; Hamisa ālek’a | አስር አለቃ; Āsiri ālek’a | ምክትል አስር አለቃ; Mikitili āsiri ālek’a | | መሠረታዊ ወታዯር; Mešeretawī wetaderi |
| Gabonese Air Force |
| Gabonese Air Force | Adjudant-chef major | Adjudant-chef | Adjudant | | | | Sergent-chef | Sergent | Caporal-chef | Caporal | Soldat première | | Soldat |
| (The Gambia) Gambia | No air force |
| Ghana Air Force | | | | | | | | | | | | | No insignia |
| Ghana Air Force | Warrant officer class I | | Warrant officer class II | | Flight sergeant | | Sergeant | | Corporal | | Leading aircraftsman | | Aircraftsman |
| Guinea Air Force |
| Guinea Air Force | Major | Adjudant-chef | Adjudant | | | | Sergent-chef | Sergent | Caporal-chef | Caporal | Soldat de 1^{ère} classe | | Soldat de 2^{ème} classe |
| Guinea-Bissau | No air force |
| Ivory Coast Air Force |
| Ivory Coast Air Force | Adjudant-chef major | Adjudant-chef | Adjudant | | | | Sergent-chef | Sergent | Caporal-chef | Caporal | Soldat de première classe | | Soldat de seconde classe |
| Kenya Air Force | | | | | | | | | | | No insignia |
| Kenya Air Force | Warrant officer class 1 | | Warrant officer class 2 | | Senior sergeant | | Sergeant | | Corporal | Lance corporal | Aircraftman |
| Lesotho Air Squadron | | | | | | | | | | | No insignia |
| Lesotho Air Squadron | Warrant officer class 1 | | Warrant officer class 2 | | Staff sergeant | | Sergeant | | Corporal | Lance corporal | Private (or equivalent) |
| Liberian Air Wing |
| Liberian Air Wing | Chief master sergeant | | Master sergeant | | Technical sergeant | | Staff sergeant | Senior airman/woman | Airman/woman first class | Airman/woman | Airman/woman basic |
| Rank group | Senior NCOs | | | | | | | | Junior NCOs | | Enlisted |
| Libyan Air Force | | | | | | | | | | | | | No insignia |
| Libyan Air Force | | | Master sergeant | | | | Staff Sergeant | Sergeant | Corporal | | Airman | | Airman basic |
| Madagascar Air Force | | | | | | | | | | | | | No insignia |
| Madagascar Air Force | Adjudant-major | Adjudant-chef | Adjudant | | Sergent-major | | Sergent-chef | Sergent | Caporal-chef | Caporal | | | Soldat |
| Malawi Air Force | | | | | | | | | | | No insignia |
| Malawi Air Force | Warrant Officer Class 1 | | Warrant Officer Class 2 | | Staff Sergeant | | Sergeant | | Corporal | Lance Corporal | Private (or equivalent) |
| Malian Air Force |
| Malian Air Force | Major | Adjudant-chef | Adjudant | | | | Sergent-chef | Sergent | Caporal-chef | Caporal | Soldat de première classe | | Soldat |
| Mauritania Islamic Air Force |
| Mauritania Islamic Air Force | مساعد أول; Mosa'id awwal | | مساعد; Mosa'id | | | | رقيب أول; Raqib awwal | رقيب; Raqib | | عريف 'arif | | | جندي; Jundiun |
| Mauritius | No air force |
| Royal Moroccan Air Force | | | | | | | | | | | | | No insignia |
| Royal Moroccan Air Force | Adjudant-chef | | Adjudant | | Sergent-major | | Sergent-chef | Sergent | Caporal-chef | Caporal | Soldat de première classe | | Soldat de deuxième classe |
| Mozambique Air Force |
| Mozambique Air Force | | | | | Intendente | | Primeiro-sargento | Segundo-sargento | Terceiro-sargento | Cabo | Primeiro soldado |
| Namibian Air Force | | | | | | | | | | | No insignia |
| Namibian Air Force | Warrant officer class 1 | | Warrant officer class 2 | | Flight sergeant | | Sergeant | | Aircraftman | Leading aircraftman | Private (or equivalent) |
| Niger Air Force |
| Niger Air Force | Adjudant-chef | | Adjudant | | | | Sergent-chef | Sergent | Caporal-chef | Caporal | Soldat de première classe | | Soldat |
| Nigerian Air Force | | | | | | | | | | | No insignia |
| Nigerian Air Force | Air warrant officer | Master warrant officer | Warrant officer | | Flight sergeant | | Sergeant | | Corporal | Lance corporal | Aircraftman |
| Rwandan Air Force | | | | | | | | | | | | | No insignia |
| Rwandan Air Force | Warrant officer I | | Warrant officer II | | Sergeant major | | Staff sergeant | Sergeant | | Corporal | | | Private |
| Rank group | Senior NCOs | | | | | | | | Junior NCOs | | Enlisted |
| São Tomé and Príncipe | No air force |
| Senegalese Air Force | | | | | | | | | | | | | No insignia |
| Senegalese Air Force | Adjudant-chef | | Adjudant | | | | Sergent-chef | Sergent | Caporal-chef | Caporal | Soldat de première classe | | Soldat |
| Seychelles Air Force |
| Seychelles Air Force | Warrant officer class 1 | | Warrant officer class 2 | | Staff sergeant | | Sergeant | | Corporal | Lance corporal | Private (or equivalent) |
| Sierra Leone | No air force |
| Somali Air Force | | | | | | | | | | | No insignia |
| Somali Air Force | Musharax sarkaal | Sadex xarígle | Laba xarígle | | Xarígle | | Sadex alífle | | Laba alífle | Alífle | Dable |
| South African Air Force | | | | | | | | | | | | | No insignia |
| South African Air Force | Warrant officer class 1 | | Warrant officer class 2 | | Flight sergeant | | Sergeant | | Corporal | Lance corporal | | | Aircraftman |
| South Sudan Air Force |
| South Sudan Air Force | Regimental sergeant major | | Sergeant major | | | | Sergeant | | Corporal | Lance corporal | Private |
| Sudanese Air Force | | | | | | | | | | | No insignia |
| Sudanese Air Force | | | مساعد; Mosa'id | | رقيب أول; Raqib awwal | | رقيب; Raqib | | عريف 'arif | وكيل عريف; Wakil 'arif | جندي; Jundiun |
| (Eswatini) Swaziland | No air force |
| Tanzania Air Force | | | | | | | | | | | No insignia |
| Tanzania Air Force | Afisa mteule daraja la kwanza | | Afisa mteule daraja la pili | | Sajinitaji | | Sajenti | | Koplo | Koplo usu | Mtu ndege |
| (Togo) Togolese Air Force | | | | | | | | | | | | | No insignia |
| (Togo) Togolese Air Force | Major | Adjudant-chef | Adjudant | | | | Sergent-chef | Sergent | Caporal-chef | Caporal | Soldat de 1^{ère} classe | | Soldat de 2^{ème} classe |
| Tunisian Air Force |
| Tunisian Air Force | وكيل أعلى; Wakil 'aelaa | وكيل أول; Wakil 'awal | وكيل; Wakil | | | | عريف أول; Earif 'awal | عريف; Earif | رقيب أول; Raqib 'awal | رقيب; Raqib | جندي أول; Jundiun awwal | | جندي متطوع; Jundiun |
| Tunisian Air Force | Major | Adjudant-chef | Adjudant | | | | Sergent-chef | Sergent | Caporal-chef | Caporal | Soldat de 1^{re} classe | | Soldat |
| Ugandan Air Force | | | | | | | | | | | No insignia |
| Ugandan Air Force | Warrant officer class 1 | | Warrant officer class 2 | | Staff sergeant | | Sergeant | | Corporal | Lance corporal | Private (or equivalent) |
| Zambian Air Force | | | | | | | | | | | No insignia |
| Zambian Air Force | Warrant officer class 1 | | Warrant officer class 2 | | Staff sergeant | | Sergeant | | Corporal | Lance corporal | Private (or equivalent) |
| Air Force of Zimbabwe | | | | | | | | | | | | | No insignia |
| Air Force of Zimbabwe | Warrant officer class 1 | | Master technician | Warrant officer class 2 | Master sergeant | Flight sergeant | Sergeant | | Corporal | Senior aircraftman | Leading aircraftman | | Aircraftman |
| Rank group | Senior NCOs | | | | | | | | Junior NCOs | | Enlisted |

== See also ==
- Comparative air force officer ranks of Africa
- Comparative army enlisted ranks of Africa
- Comparative navy enlisted ranks of Africa
