= Comparative navy enlisted ranks of Africa =

Rank comparison chart of non-commissioned officers and other personnel for navies of African states.

== Other ranks ==
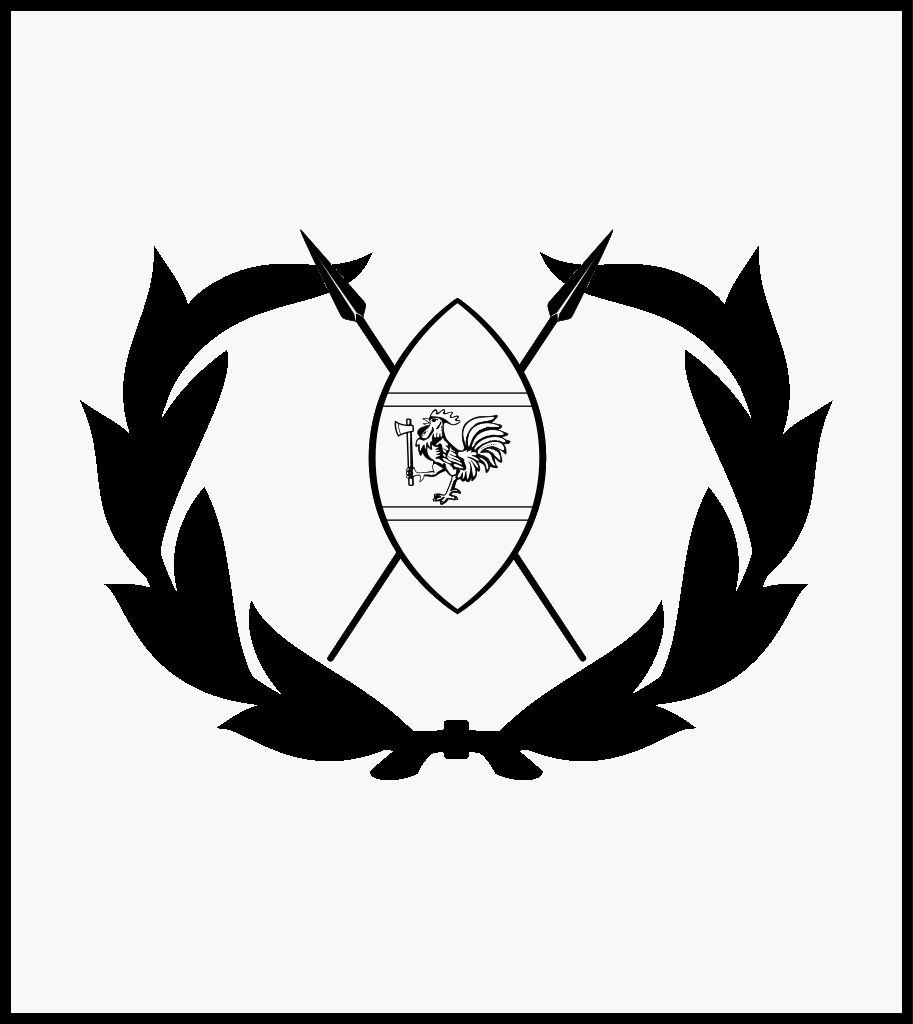
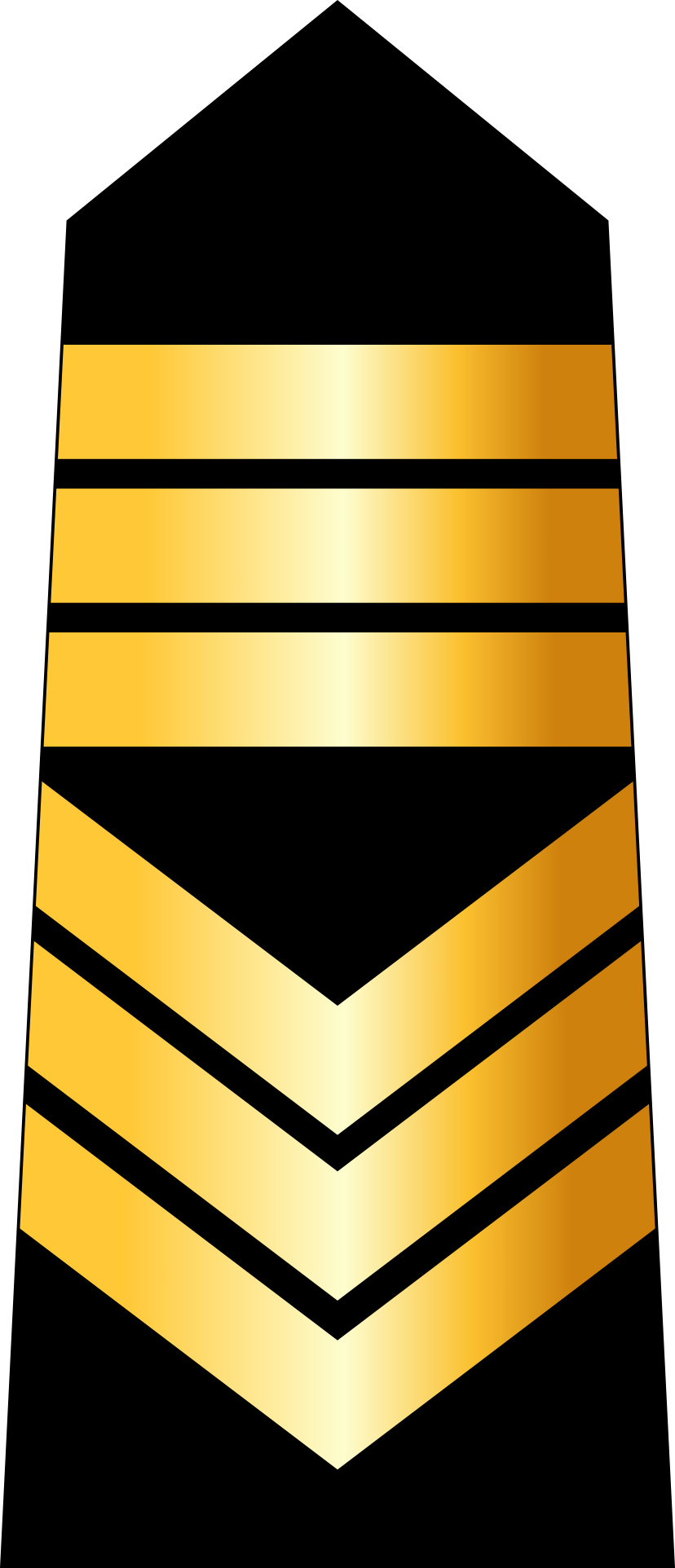
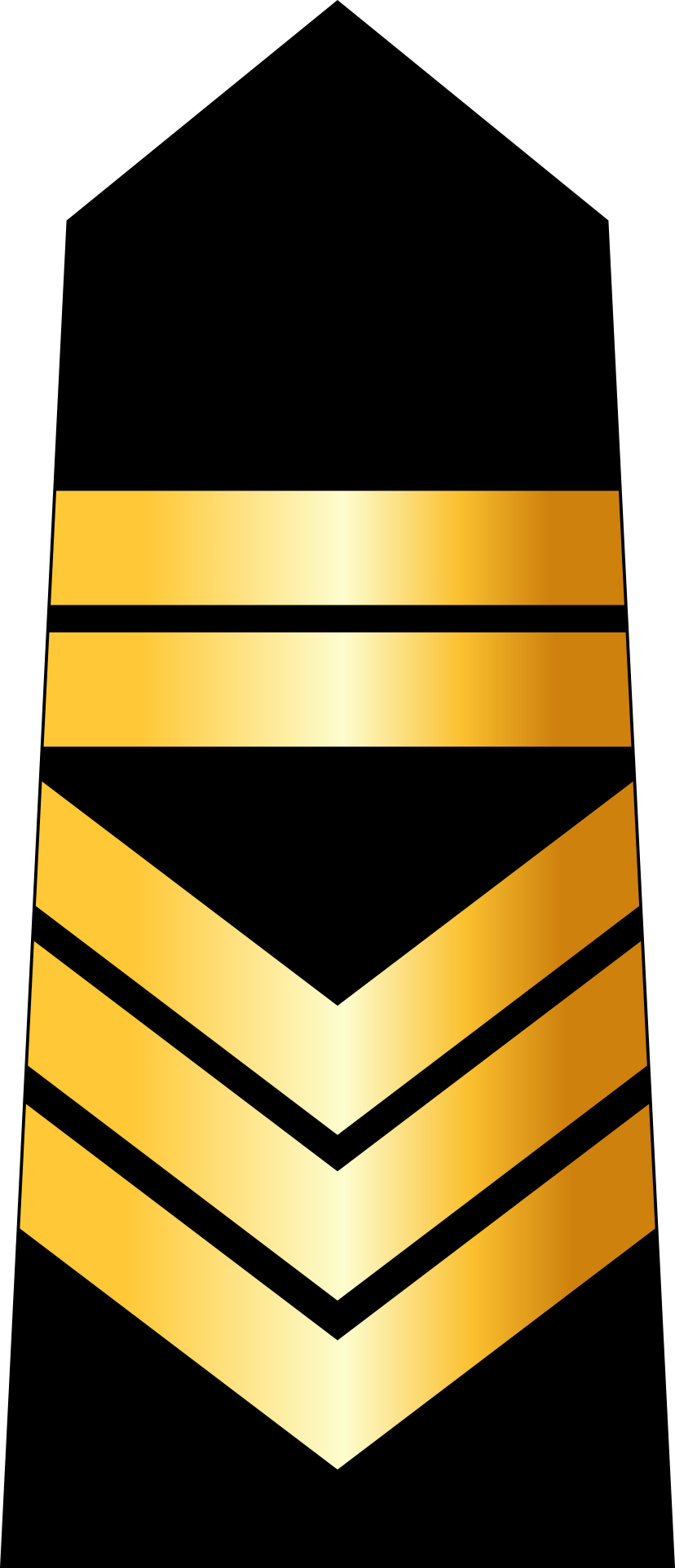
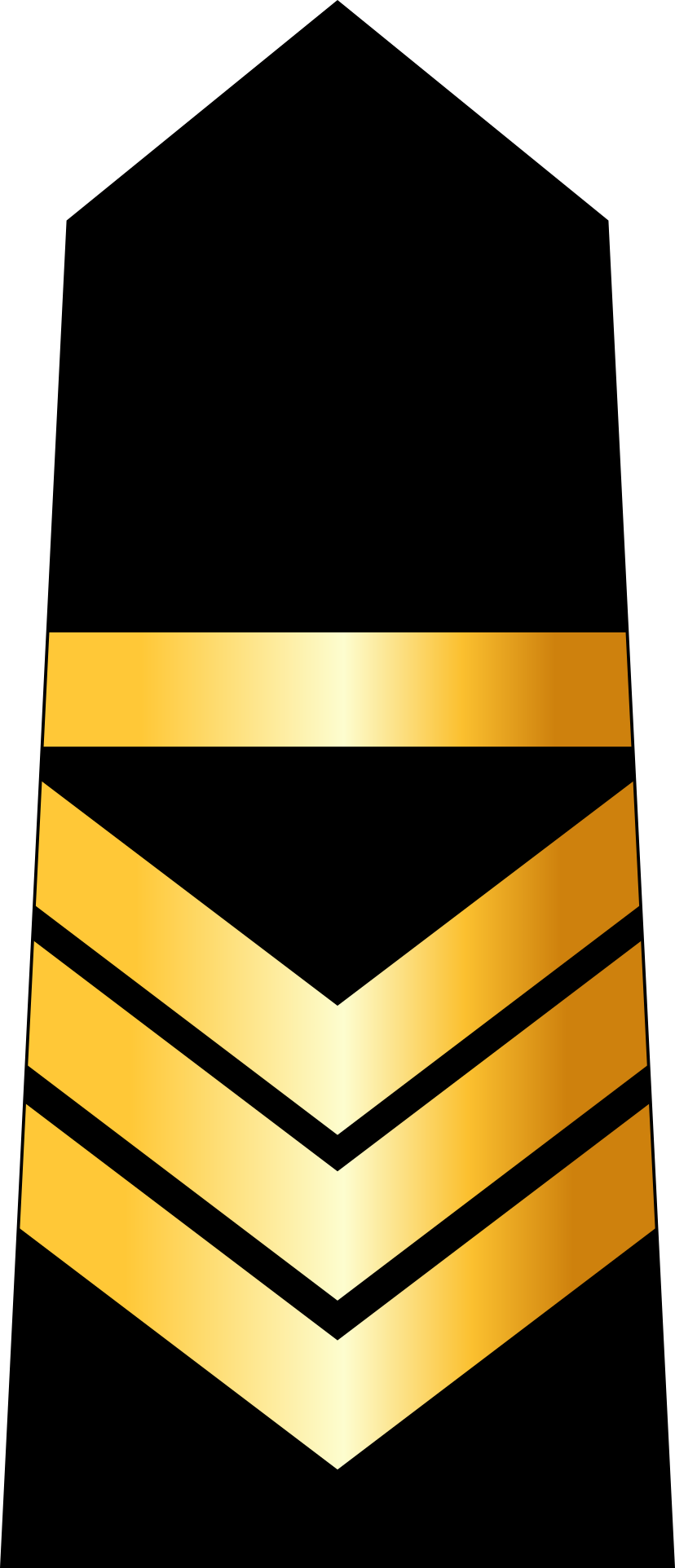
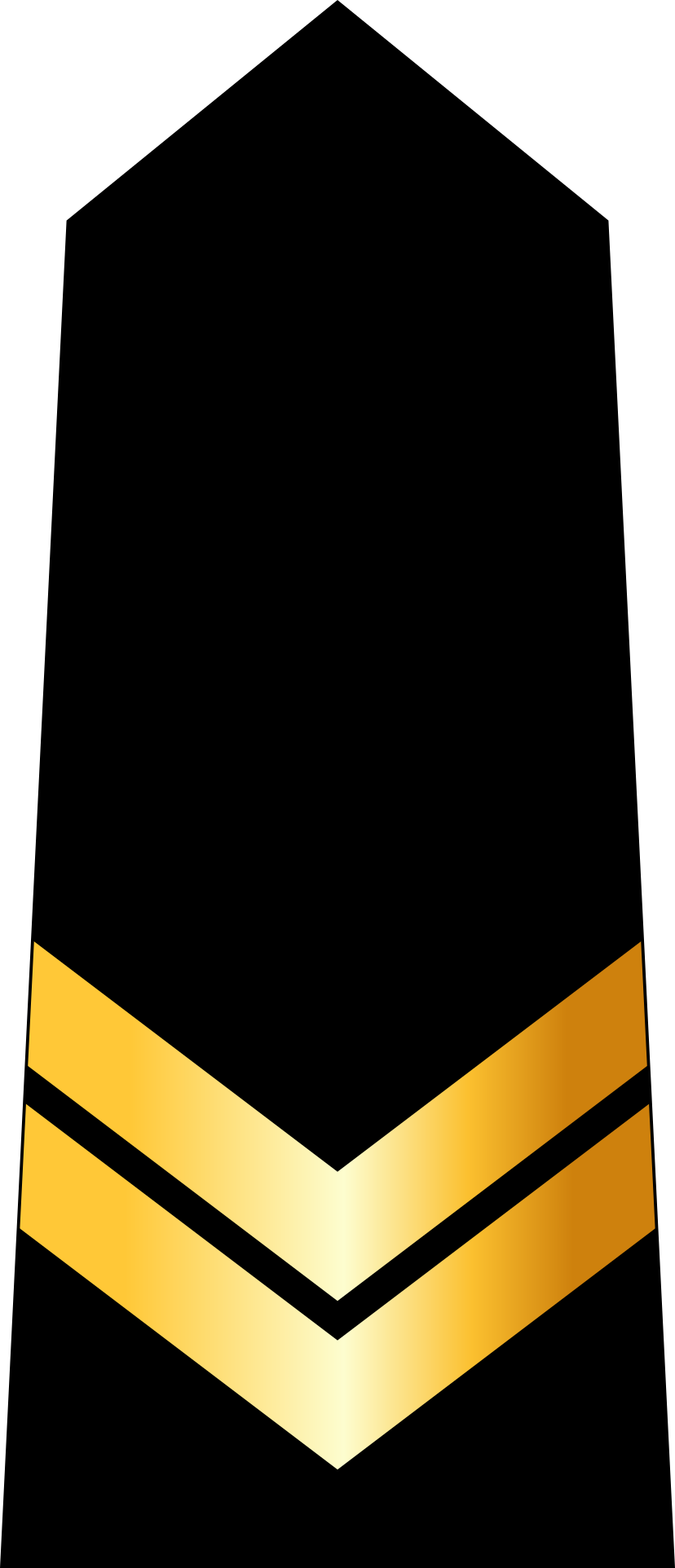
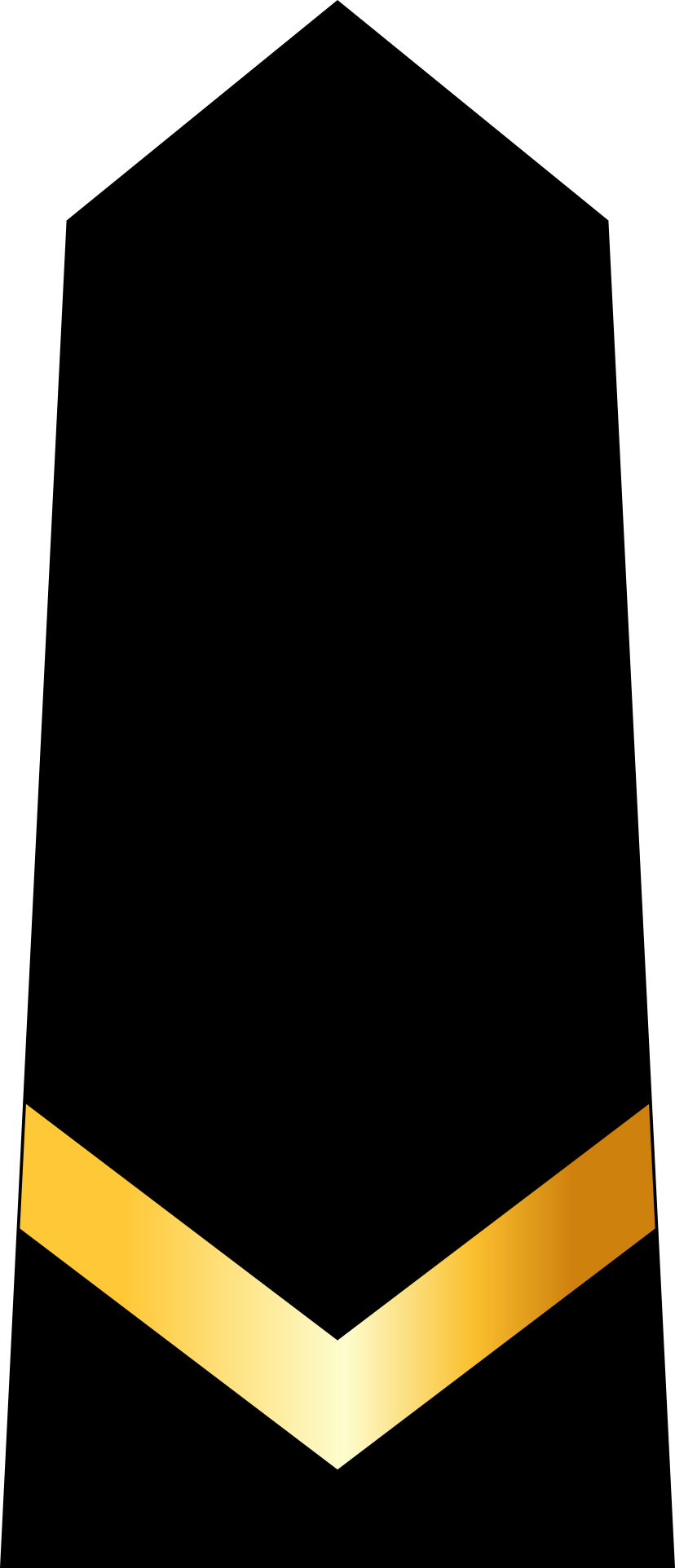
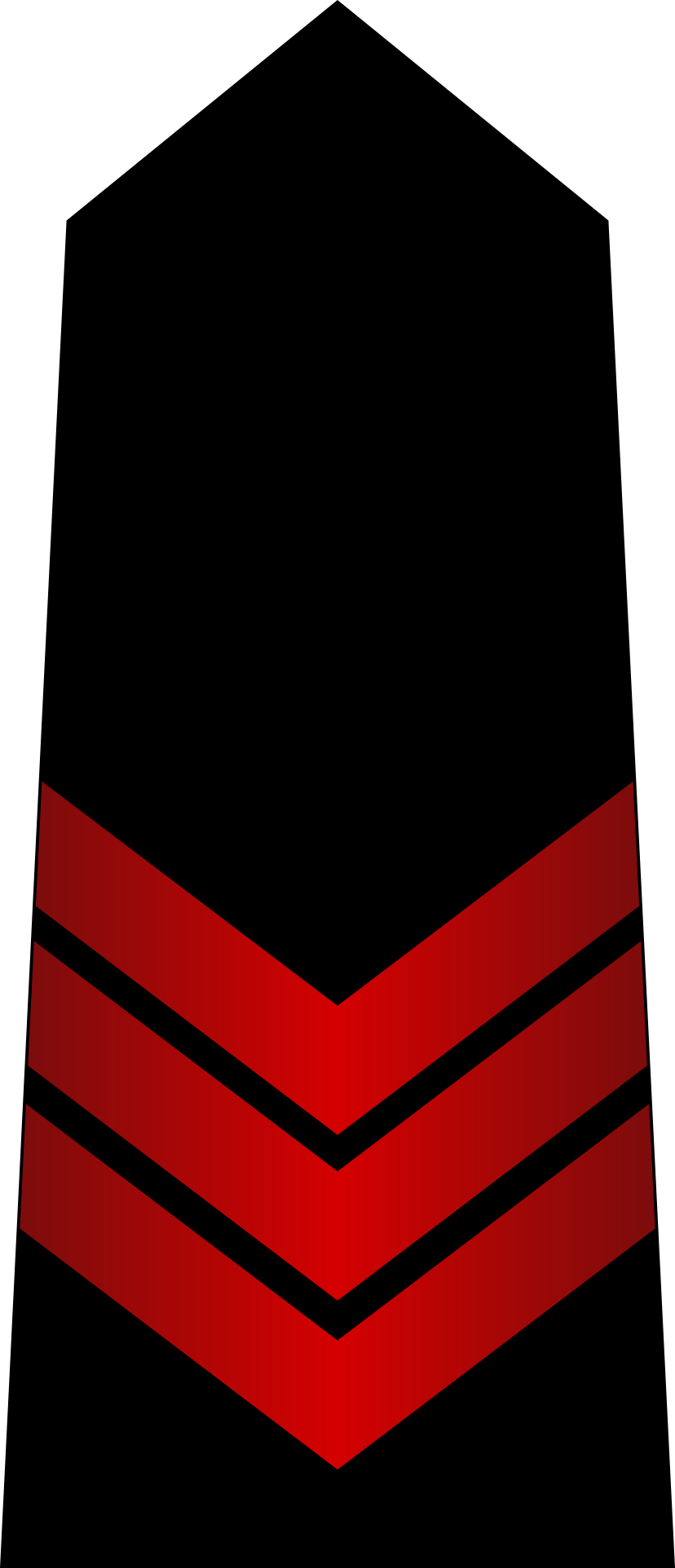
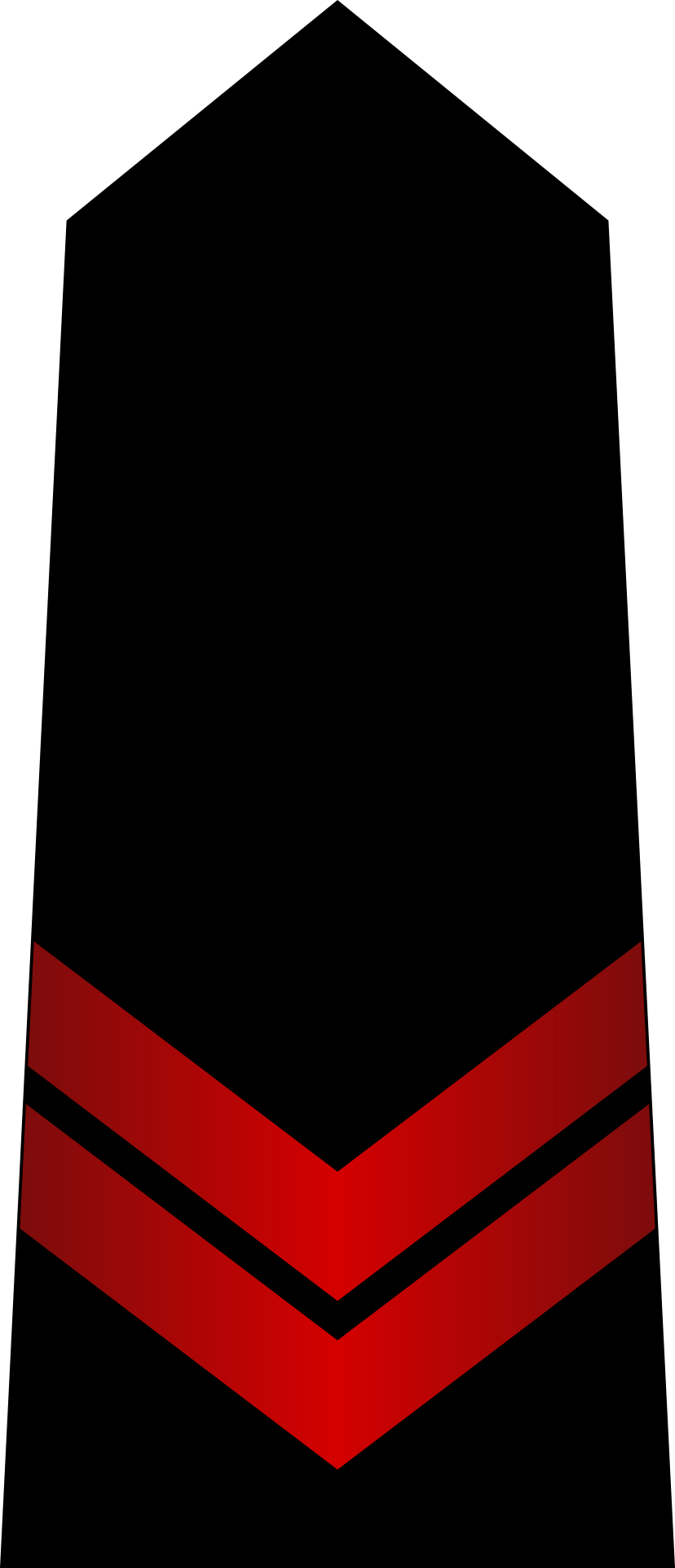
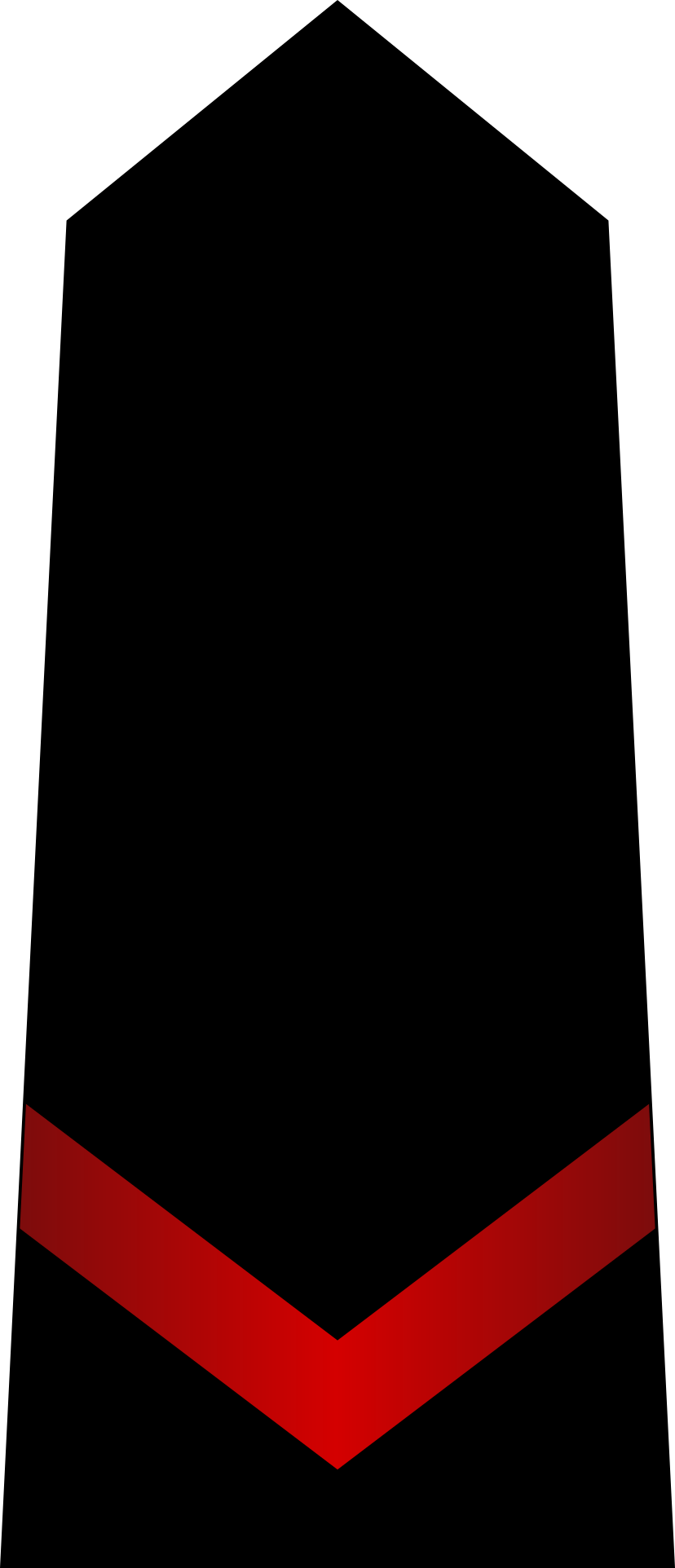
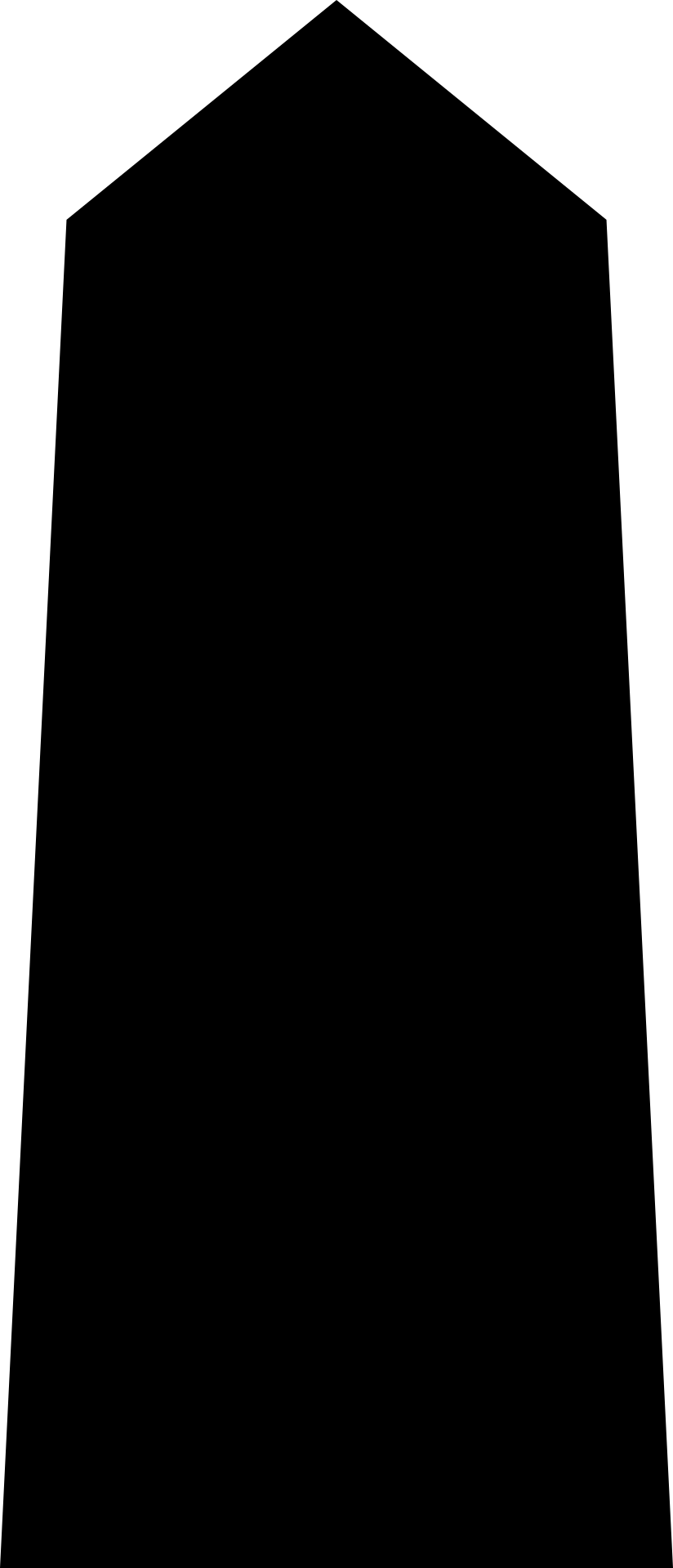
Rank group	Senior NCOs									Junior NCOs			Enlisted
Algerian National Navy															No insignia
Algerian National Navy	مساعد أول; Mosa'id awwal		مساعد; Mosa'id			رقيب أول; Raqib awwal	رقيب; Raqib			عريف أول; Earif 'awal		عريف; Earif			جندي; Jundiun
Algerian National Navy	Adjudant chef		Adjudant			Sergent chef	Sergent			Caporal chef		Caporal			Djoundi
Angolan Navy															No insignia
Angolan Navy	Sargento-mor		Sargento-chefe	Sargento-ajudante		Primeiro-sargento	Segundo-sargento			Sub-sargento			Cabo	Marinheiro	Grumete
Benin Navy															No insignia
Benin Navy	Major	Maître principal	Premier maître			Maître	Second maître			Quartier maître de 1^{er} classe		Quartier maître 2^{ème} classe	Matelot de 1^{ère} classe		Matelot de 2^{ème} classe
Botswana	No navy
Burkina Faso	No navy
Burundi	No navy
Cameroon Navy
Cameroon Navy	Maître principal		Premier maître			Maître	Second-maître			Quartier-maître de 1^{ère} classe		Quartier-maître de 2^{ème} classe	Matelot de 1^{re} classe		Matelot
Cape Verdean Coast Guard
Cape Verdean Coast Guard	Sargento-mor		Sargento-chefe	Sargento-principal		Primeiro-sargento	Segundo-sargento	Furriel	Segundo-furriel	Cabo-principal	Cabo de secção	Cabo-adjunto	Primeiro-cabo	Segundo-cabo
Central African Republic	No navy
Chad	No navy
Comoros	No navy
Navy of the DR Congo															No insignia
Navy of the DR Congo	Maître chef principal	Premier maître chef	Maître chef	Premier maître	Second maître	Maître	Quartier maître					Premier matelot	Second matelot		Matelot	Recrue
Rank group	Senior NCOs									Junior NCOs			Enlisted
Congolese Navy															No insignia
Congolese Navy	Maitre-principal		Premier maitre			Maitre	Second maitre			Quartier-maitre de 1^{ère} classe		Quartier-maitre de 2^{ème} classe	Matelot de 1^{ère} classe		Matelot de 2^{ème} classe
Djiboutian Navy
Djiboutian Navy	Maître-principal		Premier maître			Maître	Second maître			Quartier-maitre se 1^{ère} classe		Quartier-maitre se 2^{ème} classe	Matelot brevet		Matelot
Egyptian Navy
Egyptian Navy	مساعد أول; Mosa'id awwal		مساعد; Mosa'id	رقيب أول; Raqib awwal		رقيب; Raqib				عريف 'arif			جندي; Jundi
Navy of Equatorial Guinea
Navy of Equatorial Guinea			Brigada			Sarjento				Cabo primero		Cabo			Marinero
Eritrean Navy															No insignia
Eritrean Navy			Master sergeant			Staff sergeant	Sergeant			Corporal			Private first class		Private
Ethiopian Navy
Ethiopian Navy	ቺፍ ዋረንት ኦፊሰር; Chīfi wareniti ofīseri	ማስተር ቺፍ; Masiteri chīfi	ሲኒየር ቺፍ; Sīnīyeri chīfi	ቺፍ; Chīfi		ፒቲ ኦፊሰር 1ኛ ክላስ; Pītī ofīseri ānidenya kilasi	ፒቲ ኦፊሰር 2ኛ ክላስ; Pītī ofīseri huletenya kilasi			ፒቲ ኦፊሰር 3ኛ ክላስ; Pītī ofīseri sositenya kilasi	ፒቲ ኦፊሰር 4ኛ ክላስ; Pītī ofīseri āratenya kilasi	ሊዲንግ ሲማን; Līdīnigi sīmani	ኤብል ሲማን; Ēbili sīmani	ኦርድናሪ ሲማን; Oridinarī sīmani	ሲማን ሪኩሩት; Sīmani rīkuruti
Gabonese Navy
Gabonese Navy	Maître-principal major	Maître-principal	Premier maître			Maître	Second maître			Quartier-maître de 1^{ère} classe		Quartier-maître de 2^{ème} classe	Matelot brevet		Matelot
Gambian Navy
Ghana Navy													No insignia		No insignia
Ghana Navy				Chief petty officer		Petty officer first class	Petty officer second class			Leading seaman			Able seaman		Ordinary seaman
Guinean Navy
Guinean Navy	Major	Maître principal	Premier maître			Maître	Second-maître			Quartier-maître de 1^{ère} classe		Quartier-maître de 2^{ème} classe	Matelot breveté		Matelot
Navy of Guinea-Bissau
Navy of Ivory Coast
Navy of Ivory Coast	Maitre-principal major	Maitre-principal	Premier maitre			Maitre	Second maitre			Quartier-maitre de 1^{ère} classe		Quartier-maitre de 2^{ème} classe	Matelot de 1^{ère} classe		Matelot de 2^{ème} classe
Kenya Navy													No insignia
Kenya Navy	Warrant officer class 1		Warrant officer class 2	Senior sergeant		Sergeant				Corporal			Private (or equivalent)
Lesotho	No navy
Liberian National Coast Guard
Liberian National Coast Guard	Master chief petty officer		Senior chief petty officer	Chief petty officer		Petty officer first class	Petty officer second class			Petty officer third class		Seaman	Seaman recruit
Rank group	Senior NCOs									Junior NCOs			Enlisted
Libyan Navy															No insignia
Libyan Navy			Master sergeant			Staff sergeant	Sergeant			Corporal			Private 1st class		Private
Madagascar Navy															No insignia
Madagascar Navy	Maître principal	Premier maître	Maître	Second-maître de hors classe		Second-maître de 1^{ère} classe	Second-maître de 2^{ème} classe			Quartier-maître de 1^{ère} classe		Quartier-maître de 2^{ème} classe			Matelot
Malawi Navy													No insignia
Malawi Navy	Warrant officer class 1		Warrant officer class 2	Staff sergeant		Sergeant				Corporal		Lance corporal	Private (or equivalent)
Mali	No navy
Mauritanian Navy
Mauritanian Navy	مساعد أول بحري; Mosa'id awwal baḥriun		مساعد بحري; Mosa'id baḥriun			رقيب أول بحري; Raqib awwal baḥriun	رقيب بحري; Raqib baḥriun					عريف بحري 'arif baḥriun			بحار; Biḥaar
Mauritius	No navy
Royal Moroccan Navy															No insignia
Royal Moroccan Navy	Maître principal		Premier maître	Maître		Second-maître de 1^{ère} classe	Second-maître de 2^{ème} classe			Quartier-maître de 1^{ère} classe		Quartier-maître de 2^{ème} classe	Matelot de 1^{ère} classe		Matelot
Mozambique Naval Command
Mozambique Naval Command				Intendente		Primeiro-sargento	Segundo-sargento						Primeiro-cabo	Segundo-cabo	Marinheiro
Namibian Navy													No insignia
Namibian Navy	Warrant officer class 1		Warrant officer class 2	Chief petty officer		Petty officer				Leading seaman		Able seaman	Seaman
Niger	No navy
Nigerian Navy															No insignia
Nigerian Navy	Navy Warrant Officer	Master Warrant Officer	Warrant Officer			Petty officer				Leading seaman		Able seaman	Seaman		Ordinary seaman
Rwanda	No navy
Rank group	Senior NCOs									Junior NCOs			Enlisted
Coast Guard of São Tomé and Príncipe															No insignia
Coast Guard of São Tomé and Príncipe	Sargento-mor		Sargento-chefe	Sargento-ajudante		Primeiro-sargento	Segundo-sargento	Primerio-subsargento	Subsargento	Cabo		Primeiro-marinheiro	Segundo-marinheiro		Grumete
Senegalese Navy															No insignia
Senegalese Navy	Maitre-principal		Premier maitre			Maitre	Second maitre			Quartier-maitre se 1ere classe		Quartier-maitre se 2eme classe	Matelot brevet		Matelot
Seychelles Coast Guard													No insignia
Seychelles Coast Guard	Warrant officer class 1		Warrant officer class 2	Staff sergeant		Sergeant				Corporal		Lance corporal	Private (or equivalent)
Sierra Leone Navy
Sierra Leone Navy	Warrant officer class 1		Warrant officer class 2	Chief petty officer		Petty officer				Leading seaman			Able seaman		Seaman
Somali Navy													No insignia
Somali Navy	Musharax sarkaal	Sadex xarígle	Laba xarígle	Xarígle		Sadex alífle				Laba alífle		Alífle	Dable
South African Navy
South African Navy	Warrant officer class 1		Warrant officer class 2	Chief petty officer		Petty officer				Leading seaman			Able seaman		Seaman
South Sudan	No navy
Sudanese Navy													No insignia
Sudanese Navy			مساعد; Mosa'id	رقيب أول; Raqib awwal		رقيب; Raqib				عريف 'arif		وكيل عريف; Wakil 'arif	جندي; Jundiun
(Eswatini) Swaziland	No navy
Tanzania Naval Command													No insignia
Tanzania Naval Command	Afisa mteule daraja la kwanza		Afisa mteule daraja la pili	Sajinitaji		Sajenti				Koplo		Koplo usu	Mtu ndege
Togolese Navy															No insignia
Togolese Navy	Major	Maître principal	Premier-maître			Maître	Second-maître			Quartier-maitre de 1^{ère} classe		Quartier-maitre de 2^{ème} classe	Matelot de 1^{ère} classe		Matelot de 2^{ème} classe
Tunisian National Navy
Tunisian National Navy	وكيل أعلى بالبحرية; Wakil 'aelaa bialbaḥria	وكيل أول بالبحرية; Wakil 'awal bialbaḥria	وكيل بالبحرية; Wakil bialbaḥria			عريف أول بالبحرية; Earif 'awal bialbaḥria	عريف بالبحرية; Earif bialbaḥria			رقيب أول بالبحرية; Raqib 'awal bialbaḥria		رقيب بالبحرية; Raqib bialbaḥria	جندي أول بحرية; Jundiun awwal bialbaḥria		جندي متطوع بحرية; Jundiun bialbaḥria
Tunisian National Navy	Maître-principal	Premier maître	Maître			Second maître de 1^{ère} classe	Second maître de 2^{ème} classe			Quartier-maitre de 1^{ère} classe		Quartier-maitre de 2^{ème} classe	Matelot breveté		Matelot
Uganda	No navy
Zambia	No navy
Zimbabwe	No navy
Rank group	Senior NCOs									Junior NCOs			Enlisted

== See also ==
- Comparative navy enlisted ranks of the Commonwealth
- Ranks and insignia of NATO navies enlisted
