= Comparative air force officer ranks of Africa =

This is a rank comparison chart of air force officer ranks of African states.

== Officers ==
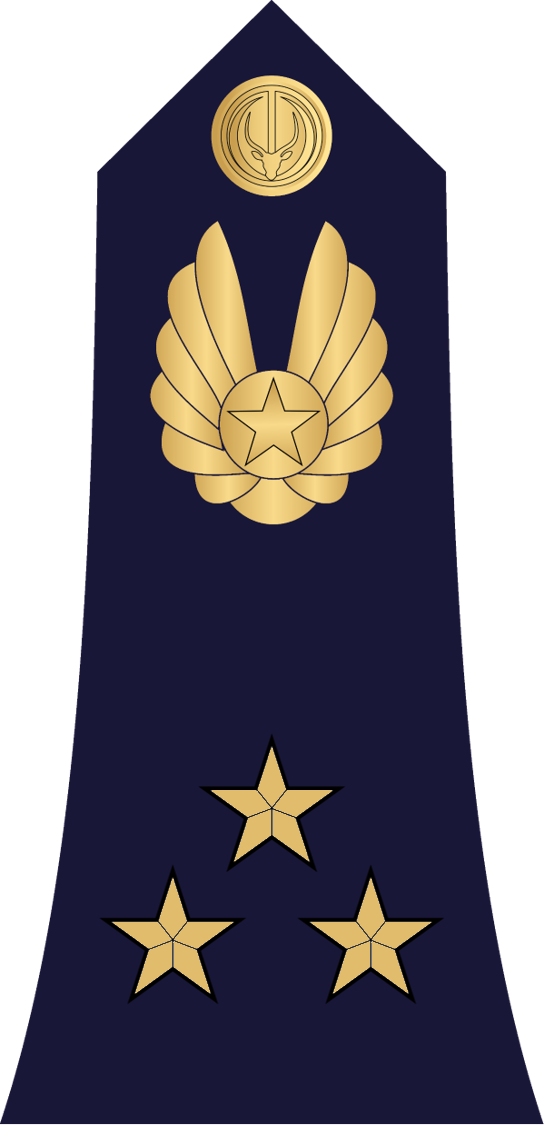
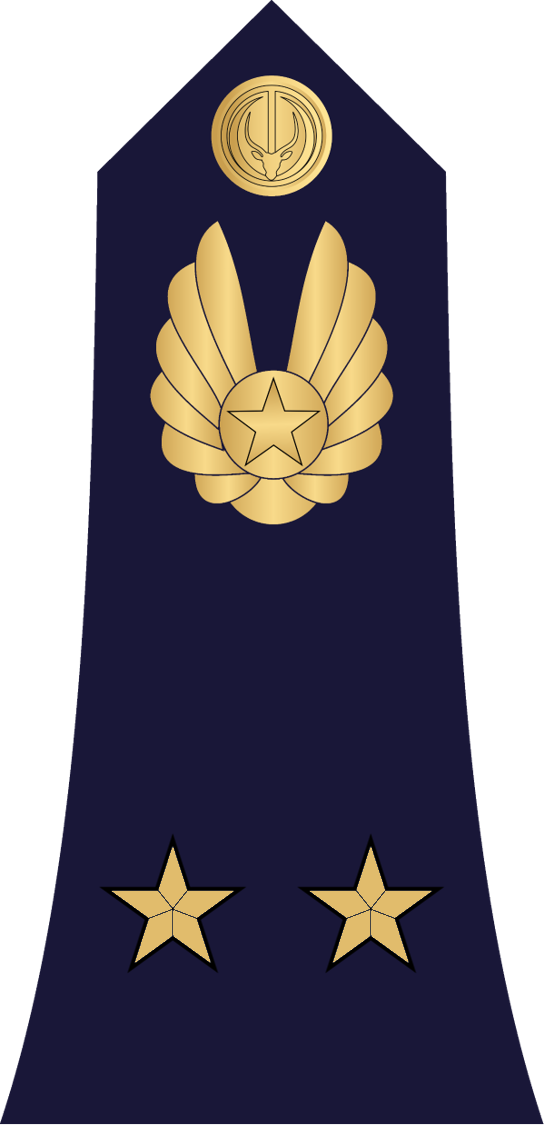
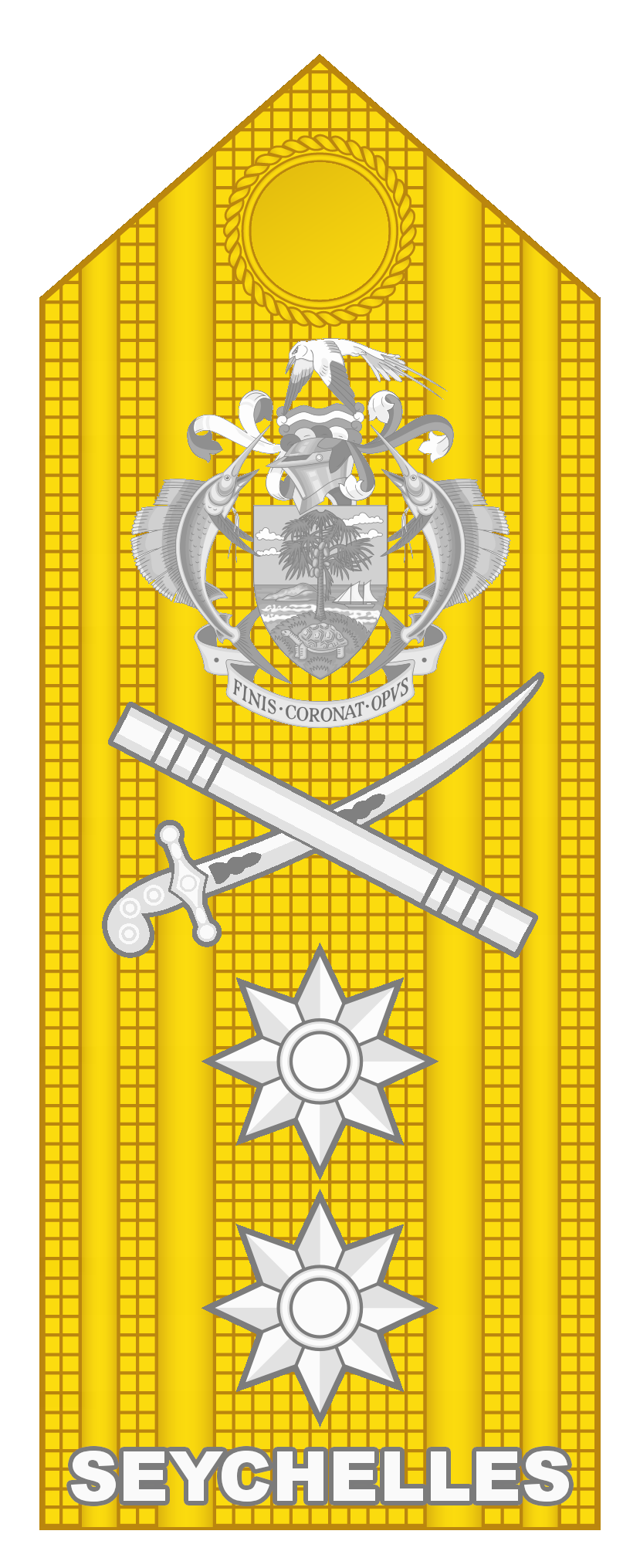
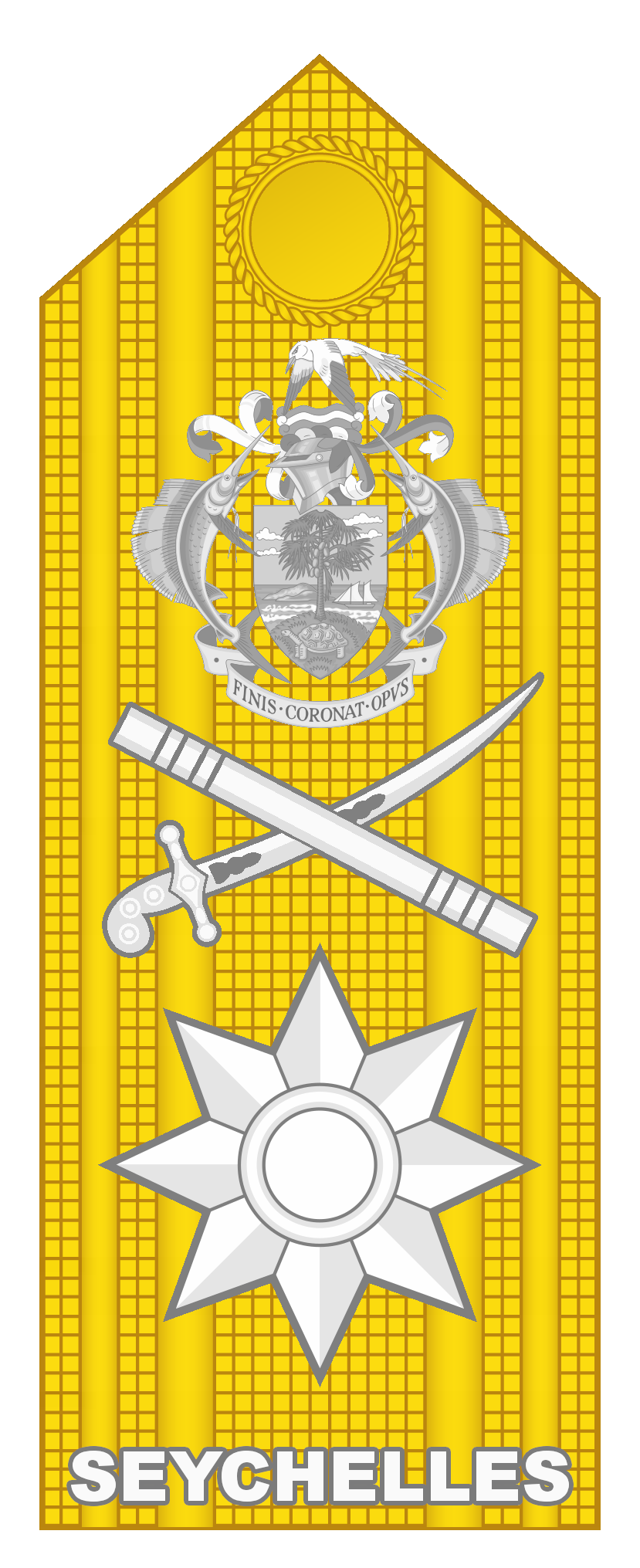
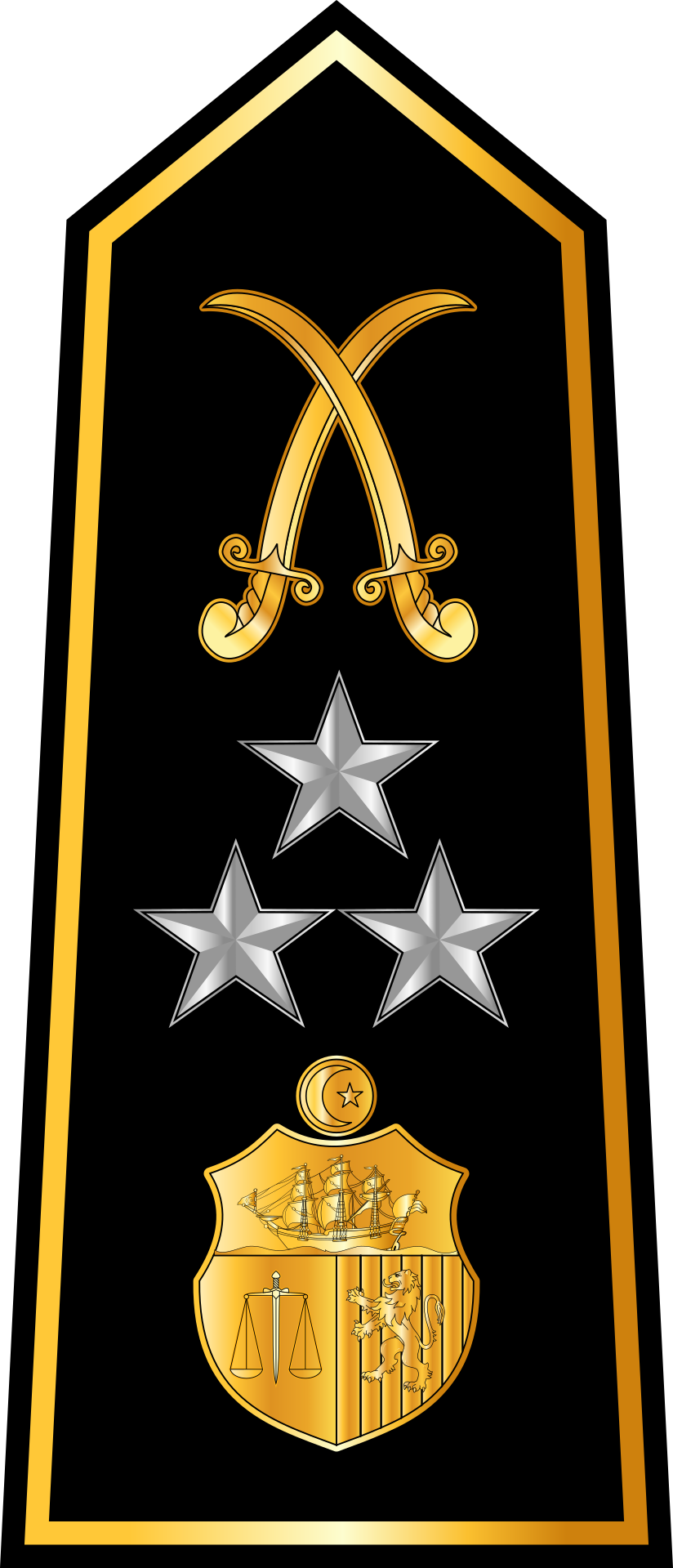
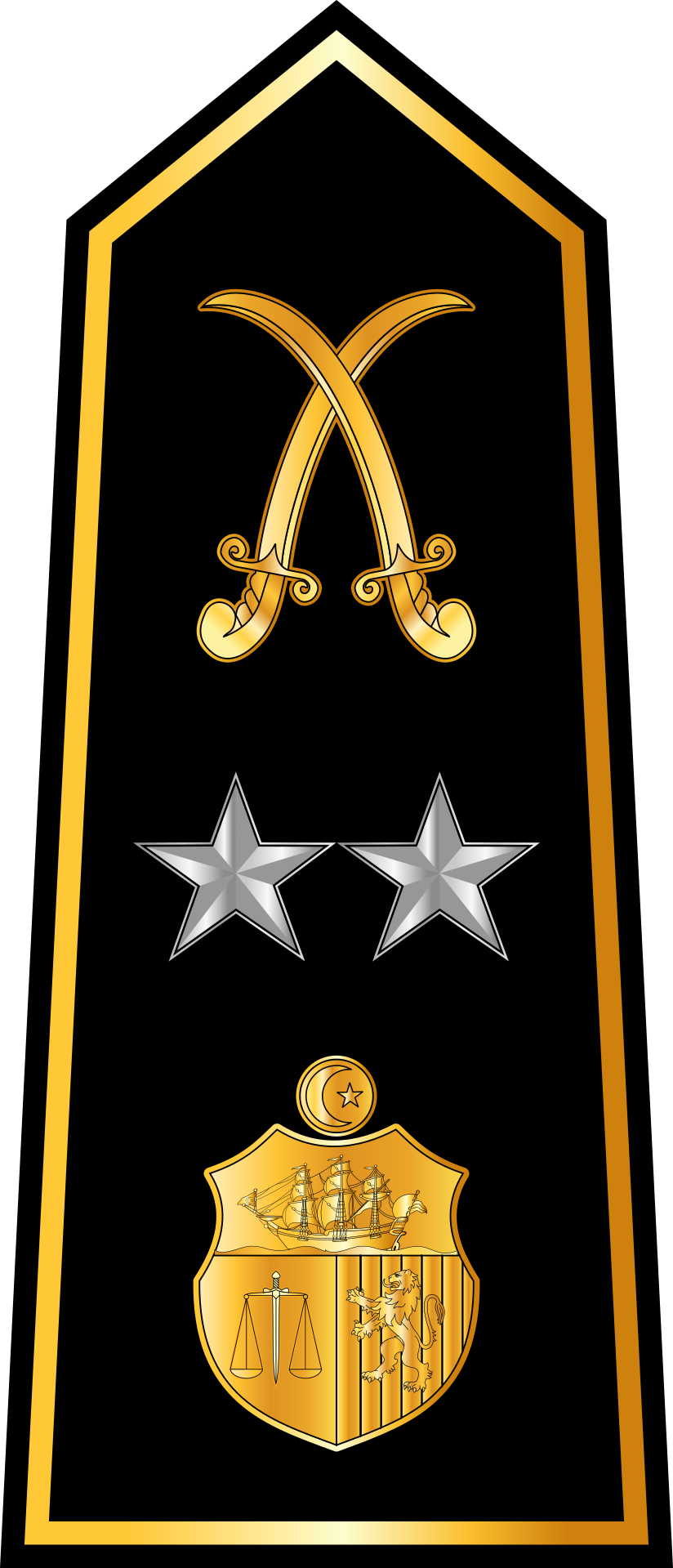
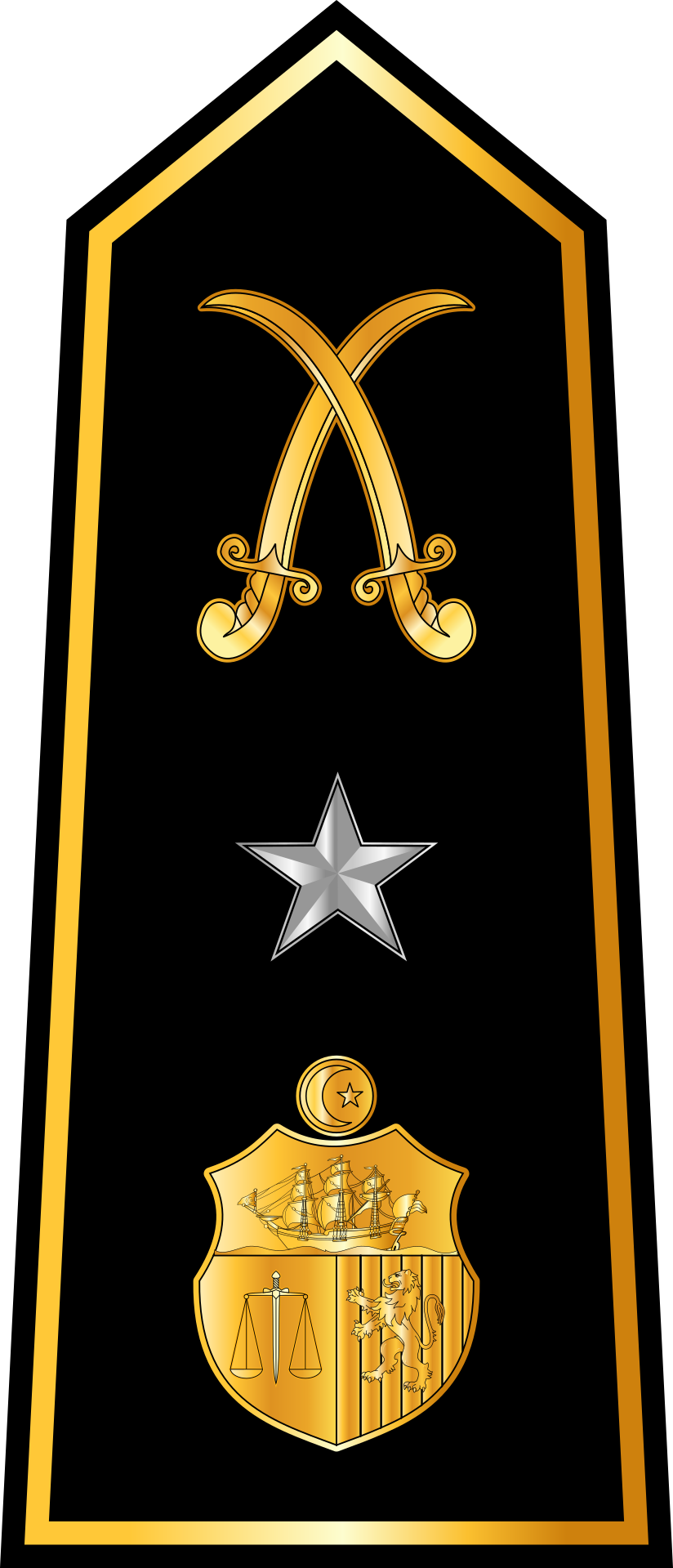
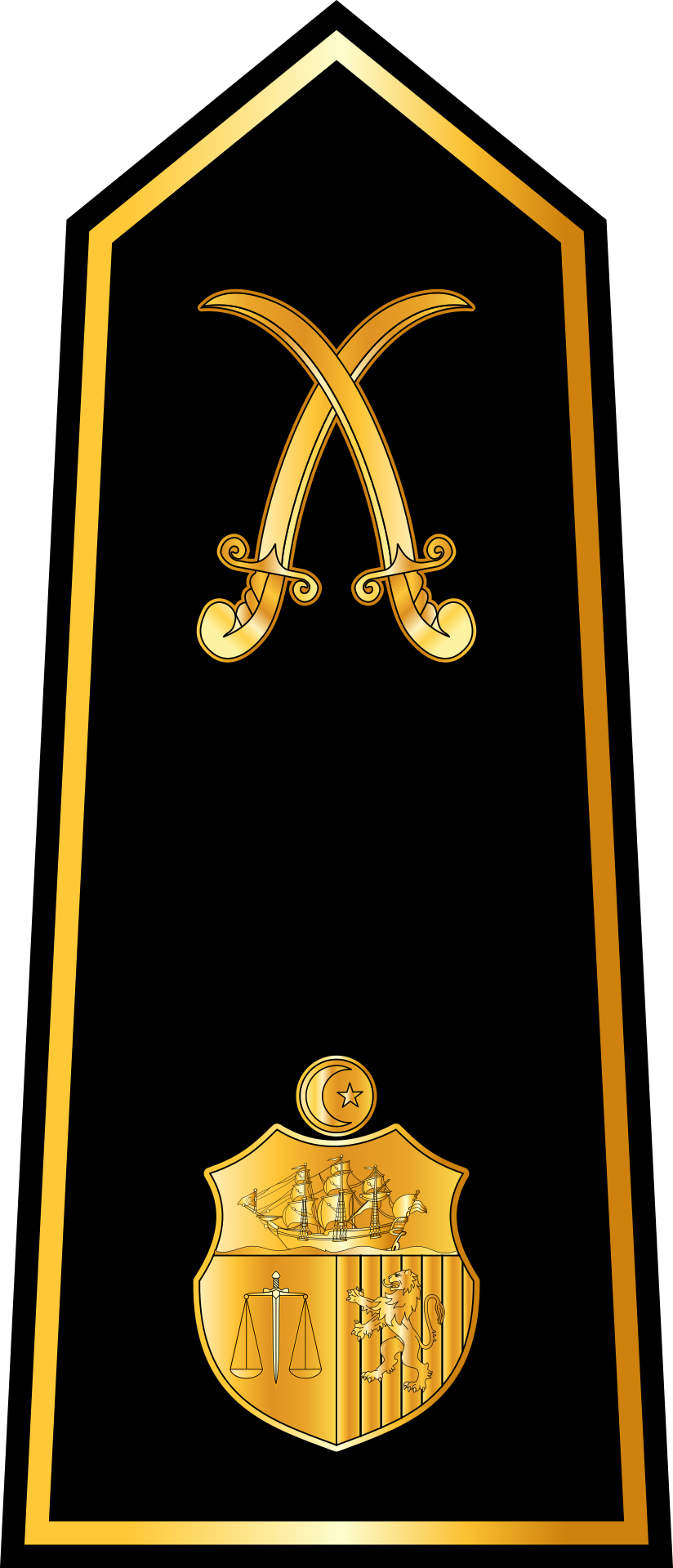
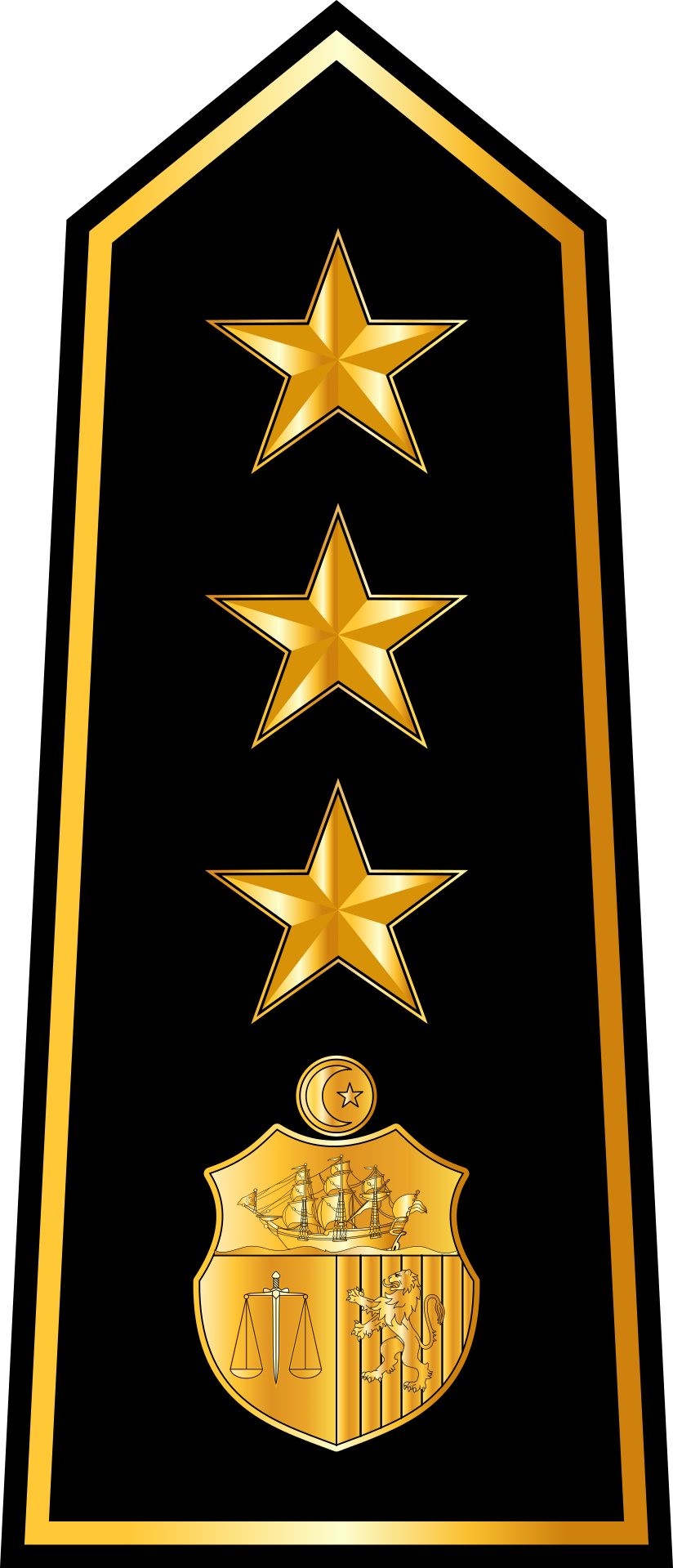
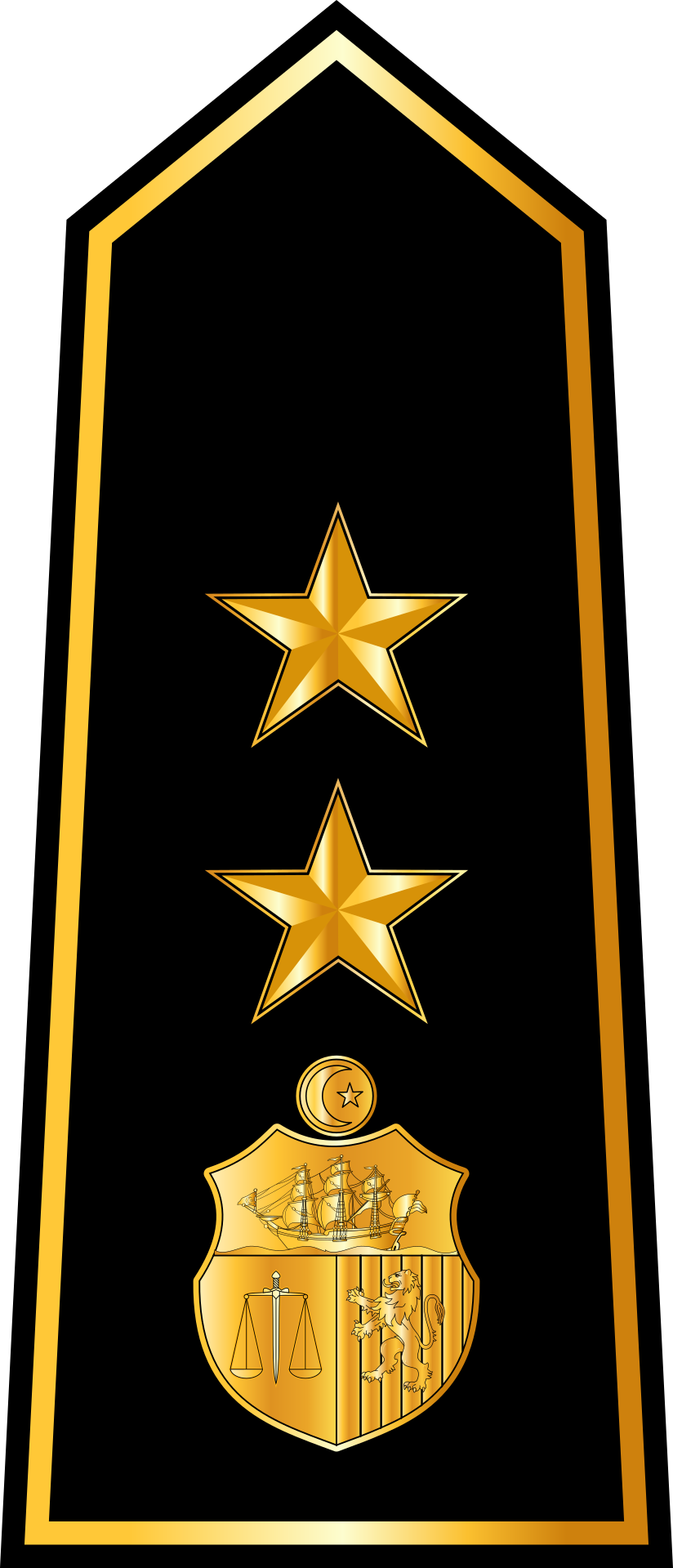
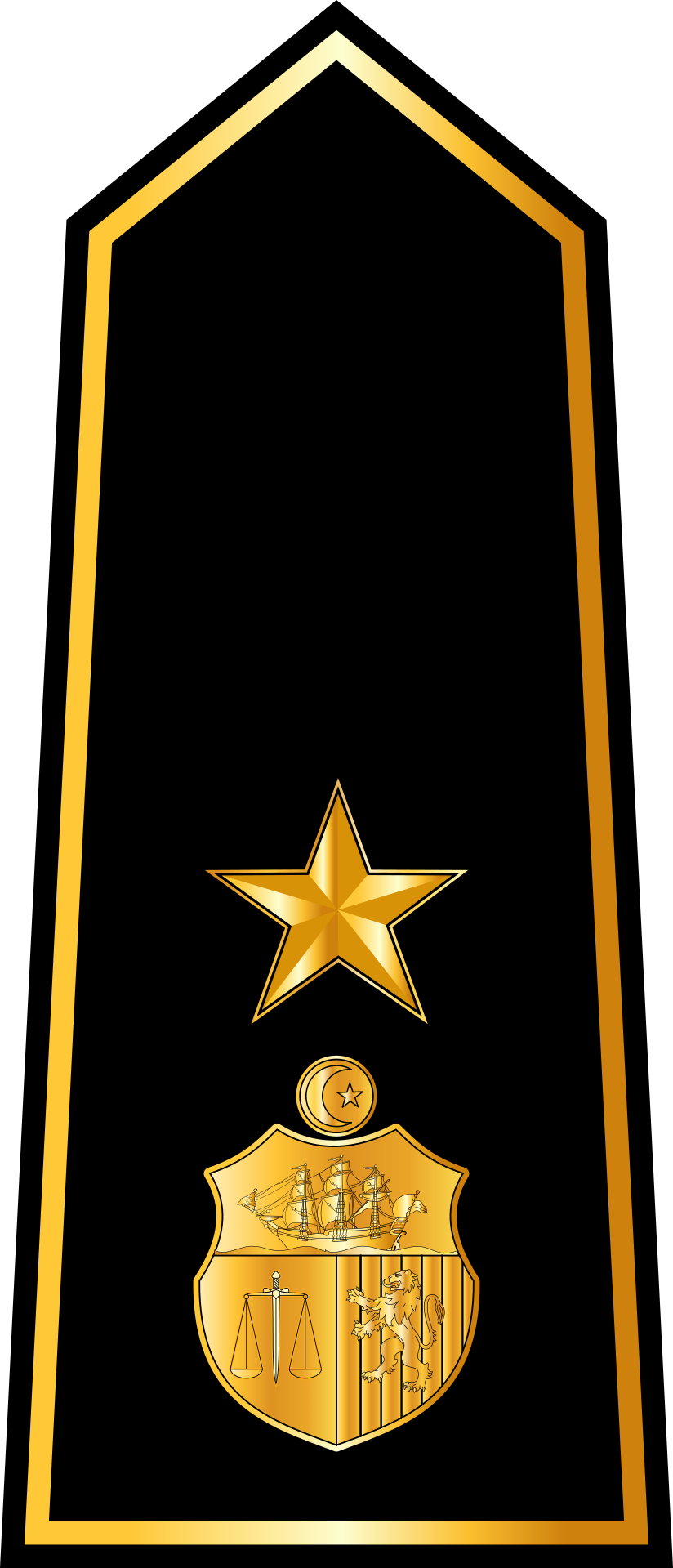
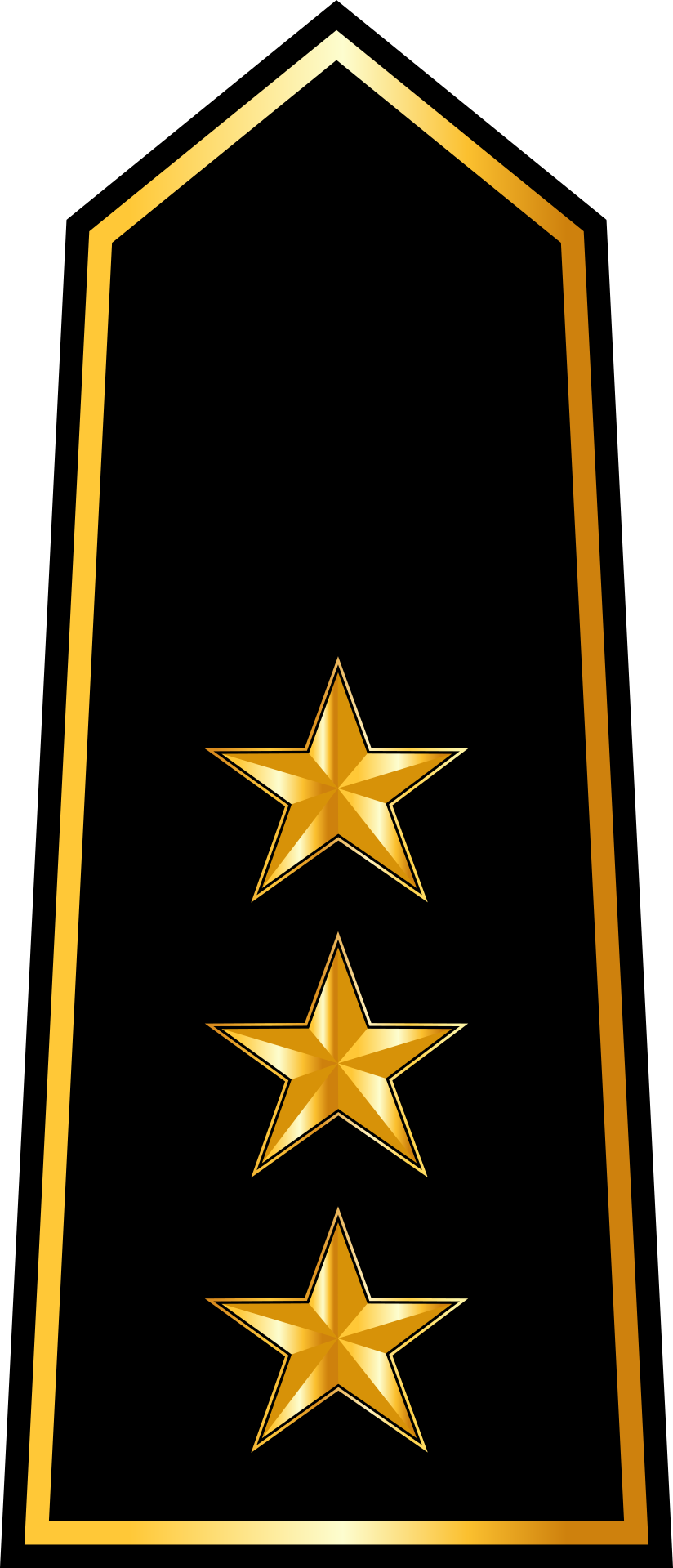
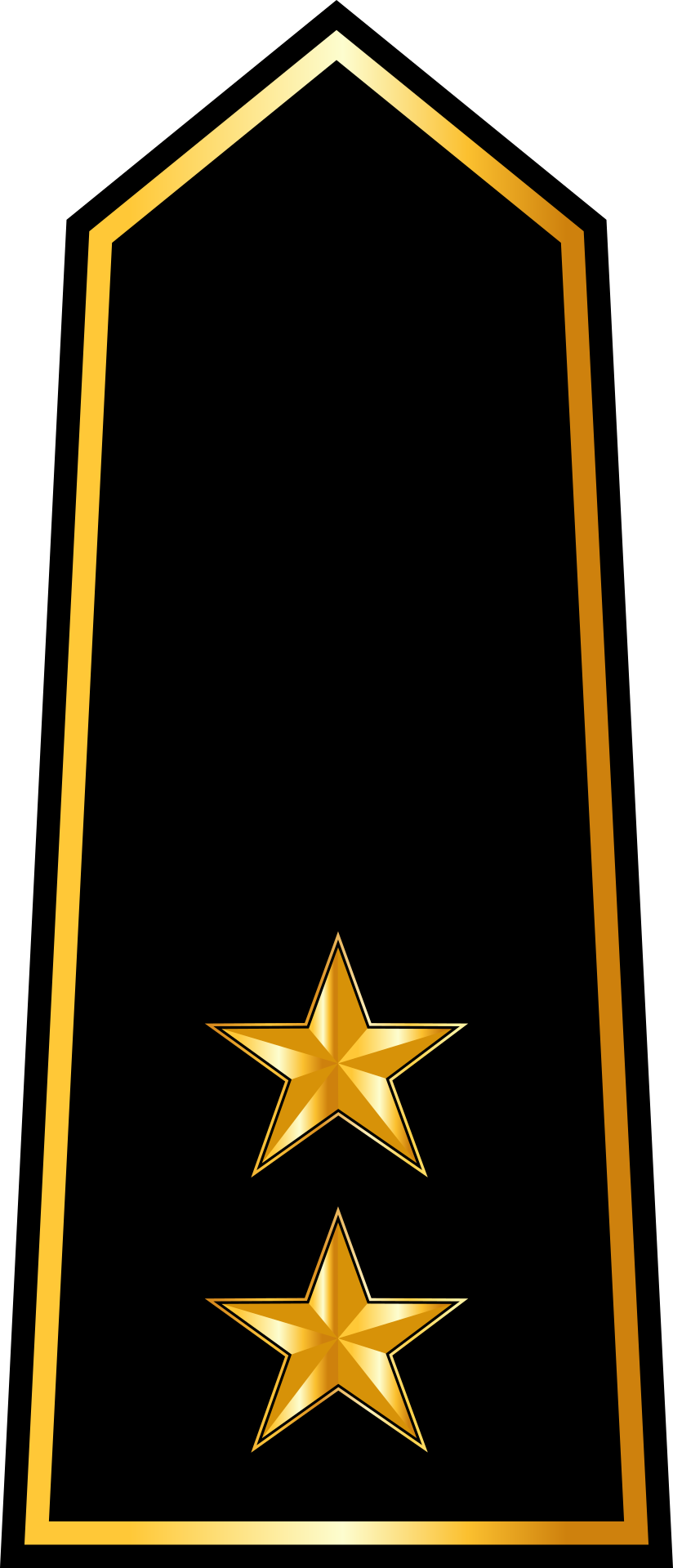
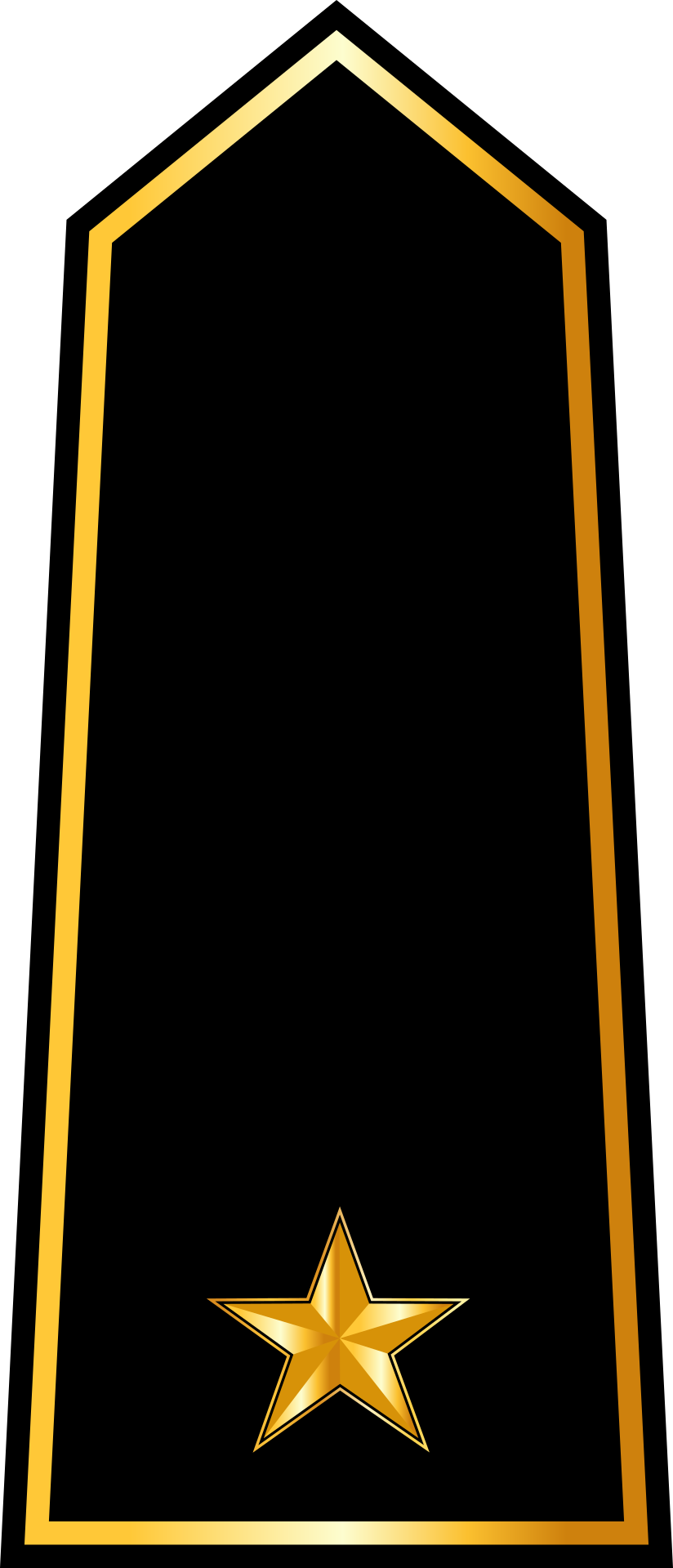
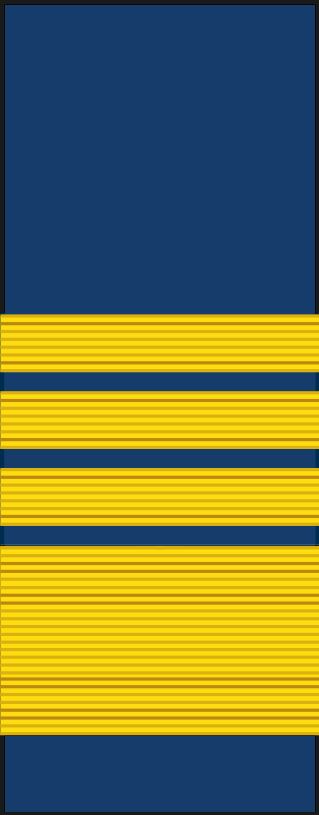
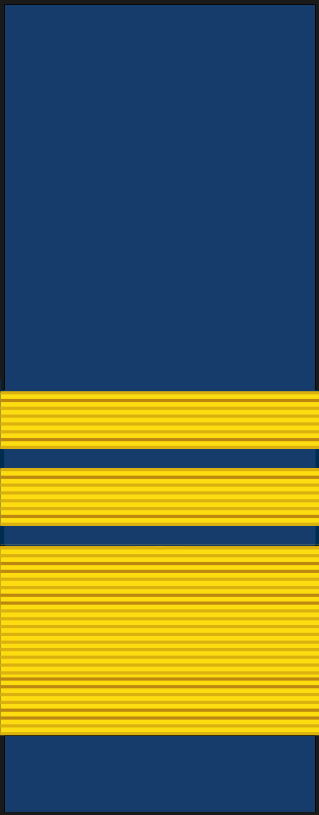
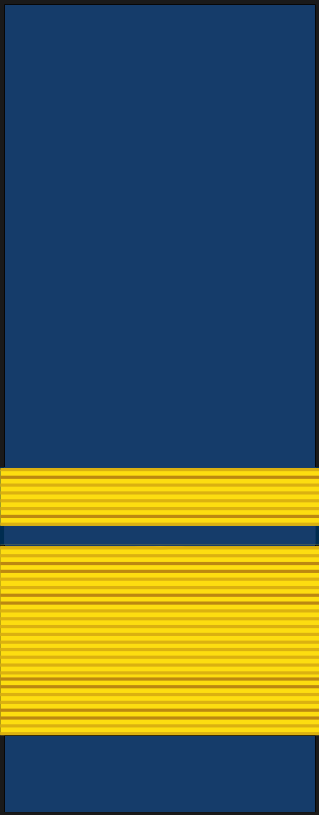
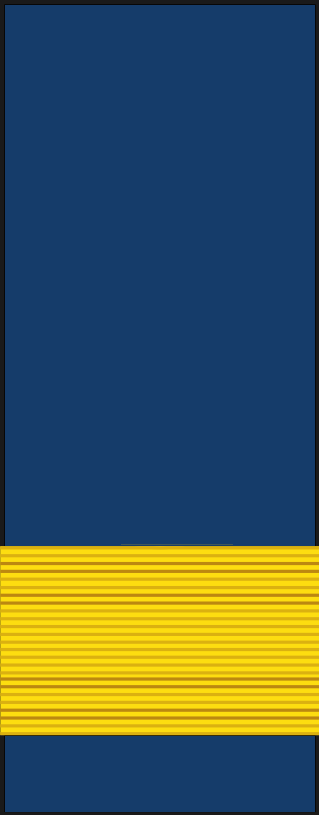
Rank group	General / flag officers					Senior officers				Junior officers
Algerian Air Force
Algerian Air Force		فريق أول; Fariq 'awal	فريق; Fariq	لواء; Liwa	عميد; Amid	عقيد; Aqid		مقدم; Muqaddam	رائد; Ra'id	نقيب; Naqib	ملازم أول; Mulazim awwal	ملازم; Mulazim
Algerian Air Force		Général d'armée	Général de corps d'armée	Général de division	Général	Colonel		Lieutenant-colonel	Commandant	Capitaine	Lieutenant	Sous-lieutenant
National Air Force of Angola
National Air Force of Angola		General-de-aviação	General	Tenente-general	Brigadeiro	Coronel		Tenente-coronel	Mayor	Capitão	Tenente	Sub-tenente
Benin	No air force
Botswana Defence Force Air Wing
Botswana Defence Force Air Wing				Major general	Brigadier	Colonel		Lieutenant colonel	Major	Captain	First lieutenant	Second lieutenant
Burkina Faso Air Force
Burkina Faso Air Force		Général d'armée	Général de corps d'armée	Général de division	Général de brigade	Colonel-major	Colonel	Lieutenant-colonel	Commandant	Capitaine	Lieutenant	Sous-lieutenant
Burundi	No air force
Cameroon Air Force
Cameroon Air Force		Général d'armée aérienne	Général de corps aérien	Général de division aérienne	Général de brigade aérienne	Colonel		Lieutenant-Colonel	Commandant	Capitaine	Lieutenant	Sous-Lieutenant
Cape Verde	No air force
Central African Air Force
Central African Air Force				Général de division	Général de brigade	Colonel		Lieutenant-colonel	Commandant	Capitaine	Lieutenant	Sous-lieutenant
Chadian Air Force
Chadian Air Force				Général de division aérienne	Général de brigade aérienne	Colonel		Lieutenant-Colonel	Commandant	Capitaine	Lieutenant	Sous-Lieutenant
Comoros	No air force
Air Force of the DR Congo
Air Force of the DR Congo		Général d'armée	Lieutenant-général	Général-major	Général de brigade	Colonel		Lieutenant-colonel	Major	Capitaine	Lieutenant	Sous-Lieutenant
Rank group	General / flag officers					Senior officers				Junior officers
Congolese Air Force
Congolese Air Force		Général d'armée	Général de corps	Général de division	Général de brigade	Colonel		Lieutenant-Colonel	Commandant	Capitaine	Lieutenant	Sous-lieutenant
Djibouti Air Force
Djibouti Air Force					Général de brigade	Colonel-major	Colonel	Lieutenant-colonel	Commandant	Capitaine	Lieutenant	Sous-lieutenant
Egyptian Air Force
Egyptian Air Force		فريق أول; Fariq 'awal	فريق; Fariq	لواء; Liwa	عميد; Amid	عقيد; Aqid		مقدم; Muqaddam	رائد; Ra'id	نقيب; Naqib	ملازم أول; Mulazim awwal	ملازم; Mulazim
Equatorial Guinea Air Force
Equatorial Guinea Air Force				General de division	General de brigada	Coronel		Teniente coronel	Comandante	Capitán	Teniente	Alférez
(Eritrea) Eritrean Air Force
(Eritrea) Eritrean Air Force				Major general	Brigadier general	Colonel		Lieutenant colonel	Major	Captain	First lieutenant	Second lieutenant
Ethiopian Air Force
Ethiopian Air Force		ጄነራል; Jēnerali	ሌተናል ጄነራል; Lētenali jēnerali	ሜጀር ጄነራል; Mējeri jēnerali	ብርጋዴር ጄነራል; Birigadēri jēnerali	ኮሎኔል; Kolonēli		ሌተናንት ኮሎኔል; Lētenaniti kolonēli	ሻለቃ; Shalek’a	ሻምበል; Shamibeli	የመቶ ዓለቃ; Yemeto ‘alek’a	ምክትል የመቶ ዓለቃ; Mikitili yemeto ‘alek’a
Gabonese Air Force
Gabonese Air Force		Général d'armée	Général de corps d'armée	Général de division	Général de brigade	Colonel		Lieutenant-colonel	Commandant	Capitaine	Lieutenant	Sous-Lieutenant
(The Gambia) Gambia	No air force
Ghana Air Force
Ghana Air Force		Air chief marshal	Air marshal	Air vice-marshal	Air commodore	Group captain		Wing commander	Squadron leader	Flight lieutenant	Flying officer	Pilot officer
Guinea Air Force
Guinea Air Force		Général d'armée	Général de corps d'armée	Général de division	Général de brigade	Colonel		Lieutenant-colonel	Commandant	Capitaine	Lieutenant	Sous-lieutenant
Guinea-Bissau	No air force
Ivory Coast Air Force
Ivory Coast Air Force		Général d'armée	Général de corps d'armée	Général de division	Général de brigade	Colonel-major	Colonel	Lieutenant-colonel	Commandant	Capitaine	Lieutenant	Sous-lieutenant
Kenya Air Force
Kenya Air Force	Commander-in-Chief	General	Lieutenant general	Major general	Brigadier	Colonel		Lieutenant colonel	Major	Captain	Lieutenant	Second lieutenant
Lesotho Air Squadron
Lesotho Air Squadron			Lieutenant general	Major general	Brigadier	Colonel		Lieutenant colonel	Major	Captain	First lieutenant	Second lieutenant
Rank group	General / flag officers					Senior officers				Junior officers
Liberian Air Wing
Liberian Air Wing						Colonel		Lieutenant colonel	Major	Captain	Lieutenant	Second lieutenant
Libyan Air Force
Libyan Air Force	مشير; Mushir	فريق أول; Fariq 'awal	فريق; Fariq	لواء; Liwa	عميد; Amid	عقيد; Aqid		مقدم; Muqaddam	رائد; Ra'id	نقيب; Naqib	ملازم أول; Mulazim awwal	ملازم; Mulazim
Madagascar Air Force
Madagascar Air Force		Général d'armée	Général de corps d'armée	Général de division	Général de brigade	Colonel		Lieutenant-colonel	Commandant	Capitaine	Lieutenant	Sous-lieutenant
Malawi Air Force
Malawi Air Force		General	Lieutenant general	Major general	Brigadier general	Colonel		Lieutenant colonel	Major	Captain	First lieutenant	Second lieutenant
Malian Air Force
Malian Air Force		Général d'armée	Général de corps d'armée	Général de division	Général de brigade	Colonel-major	Colonel	Lieutenant-colonel	Commandant	Capitaine	Lieutenant	Sous-lieutenant
Mauritania Islamic Air Force
Mauritania Islamic Air Force			فريق; Fariq	لواء; Liwa		عميد; Amid		مقدم; Muqaddam	رائد; Ra'id	نقيب; Naqib	ملازم أول; Mulazim awwal	ملازم; Mulazim
Mauritius	No air force
Royal Moroccan Air Force
Royal Moroccan Air Force		Général d'armée aerienne	Général de corps aerienne	Général de division aerienne	Général de brigade aerienne	Colonel major	Colonel	Lieutenant-colonel	Commandant	Capitaine	Lieutenant	Sous-lieutenant
Mozambique Air Force
Mozambique Air Force		Coronel General	Tenente General	Major General		Coronel		Tenente Coronel	Major	Capitão	Tenente	Alferes
Namibian Air Force
Namibian Air Force		Chief air marshal	Air marshal	Air vice marshal	Air commodore	Group captain		Wing commander	Squadron leader	Flight lieutenant	Flying officer	Pilot officer
Niger Air Force
Niger Air Force						Colonel		Lieutenant-colonel	Commandant	Capitaine	Lieutenant	Sous-lieutenant
Nigerian Air Force
Nigerian Air Force	Marshal of the air force	Air chief marshal	Air marshal	Air vice-marshal	Air commodore	Group captain		Wing commander	Squadron leader	Flight lieutenant	Flying officer	Pilot officer
Rwandan Air Force
Rwandan Air Force		General	Lieutenant general	Major general	Brigadier general	Colonel		Lieutenant colonel	Major	Captain	Lieutenant	Second lieutenant
Rank group	General / flag officers					Senior officers				Junior officers
São Tomé and Príncipe	No air force
Senegalese Air Force
Senegalese Air Force				Général de division	Général de brigade	Colonel		Lieutenant-colonel	Commandant	Capitaine	Lieutenant	Sous-lieutenant
Seychelles Air Force
Seychelles Air Force				Major general (Note: Introduced December 2024)	Brigadier general	Colonel		Lieutenant colonel	Major	Captain	Lieutenant	Second lieutenant
Sierra Leone	No air force
Somali Air Force
Somali Air Force			Sareeye guud	Sareeye gaas	Sareeye guuto	Gashaanle sare		Gashaanle dhexe	Gashaanle	Dhamme	Laba xídígle	Xídígle
South African Air Force
South African Air Force		General	Lieutenant general	Major general	Brigadier general	Colonel		Lieutenant colonel	Major	Captain	Lieutenant	Second lieutenant
South Sudan Air Force
South Sudan Air Force	Air marshal	General	Lieutenant general	Major general	Brigadier general	Colonel		Lieutenant colonel	Major	Captain	First lieutenant	Second lieutenant
Sudanese Air Force
Sudanese Air Force	مشیر; Mushir	فريق أول; Fariq 'awal	فريق; Fariq	لواء; Liwa	عميد; Amid	عقيد; Aqid		مقدم; Muqaddam	رائد; Ra'id	نقيب; Naqib	ملازم أول; Mulazim awwal	ملازم; Mulazim
(Eswatini) Swaziland	No air force
Tanzania Air Force
Tanzania Air Force		Jenerali	Luteni jenerali	Meja jenerali	Brigedia jenerali	Kanali		Luteni kanali	Meja	Kapteni	Luteni	Luteni usu
(Togo) Togolese Air Force
(Togo) Togolese Air Force				Général de division aérienne	Général de brigade aérienne	Colonel-major	Colonel	Lieutenant-colonel	Commandant	Capitaine	Lieutenant	Sous-lieutenant
Tunisian Air Force
Tunisian Air Force			فريق أول; Fariq 'awal	فريق; Fariq	أمير لواء 'amir liwa'	عميد; Amid	عقيد; Aqid	مقدم; Muqaddam	رائد; Ra'id	نقيب; Naqib	ملازم أول; Mulazim awwal	ملازم; Mulazim
Tunisian Air Force			Général de corps d'armée	Général de division	Général de brigade	Colonel-major	Colonel	Lieutenant-colonel	Commandant	Capitaine	Lieutenant	Sous-lieutenant
Ugandan Air Force
Ugandan Air Force		General	Lieutenant general	Major general	Brigadier	Colonel		Lieutenant colonel	Major	Captain	Lieutenant	Second lieutenant
Zambian Air Force
Zambian Air Force		General	Lieutenant general	Major general	Brigadier	Colonel		Lieutenant colonel	Major	Captain	Lieutenant	Second lieutenant
Air Force of Zimbabwe
Air Force of Zimbabwe		Air chief marshal	Air marshal	Air vice-marshal	Air commodore	Group captain		Wing commander	Squadron leader	Flight lieutenant	Air lieutenant	Air sub-lieutenant
Rank group	General / flag officers					Senior officers				Junior officers

== See also ==
- Comparative air force officer ranks of the Americas
- Ranks and insignia of NATO air forces officers
