= Second master =

French naval rank and historical rating in the British Royal Navy

Second master (French: Second-maître) is a military rank used in multiple Francophone navies across the world as well as a former rating in the Royal Navy.

== United Kingdom ==
Second master was introduced in 1753 and indicated a deputy master on third-rate ships of the line or larger.

Second masters were paid significantly more than master's mates, £5 5s per month. A second master was generally a master's mate who had passed his examination for master and was deemed worthy of being master of a vessel. Second masters were given the first opportunity for master vacancies as they occurred.

Master's mates also acted as second master of vessels too small to be allocated a warranted master.

== Gallery ==
Tweede meester
French: Second-maître
German: Zweiter Meister
(Belgian Navy)

Second-maître
(Cameroon Navy)

Second-maître
(Navy of the DR Congo)

Second-maître
(Congolese Navy)

Second-maître
(Djiboutian Navy)

Second-maître
(French Navy)

Second-maître
(Gabonese Navy)

Second-maître
(Guinean Navy)

Second-maître
(Navy of Ivory Coast)

Segundo maestre
(Mexican Navy)

Second-maître
(Senegalese Navy)

Second-maître
(Togolese Navy)
