= Leading firefighter =

Rank in some British fire brigades

Leading firefighter (previously leading fireman and leading firewoman) is a rank in the Isle of Man Fire and Rescue Service, London Fire Brigade and the Gibraltar Fire and Rescue Service. It used to be in all British fire services, ranking between firefighter and sub-officer. A leading firefighter was usually in charge of a single fire appliance. The badge of rank was one white or silver bar on the epaulettes (or the collar of the firefighting uniform). The helmet was yellow with one 12.5 mm (0.49 in) black stripe on it.

There were referred to as "LF" on station and the fire ground.

With the move from a rank based structure to a role based structure, the rank of leading firefighter has disappeared. Those who held the rank are now called crew manager or crew commander and wear the insignia of the old sub-officer rank. Crew manager/crew commander is a rank that amalgamated the two previous ranks of leading fireman and sub officer in the Fire Service.

On 11 October 2019, the London Fire Brigade reverted to the rank system, bring back the original Leading Firefighter, Sub Officer, and Station Officer ranks.
