= Crew commander =

A crew commander or crew manager is a rank within the fire service in the United Kingdom. It is a senior rank to a firefighter, but junior to a watch commander or watch manager.

The UK Fire Service is phasing out "ranks" in favor of "roles", and therefore technically speaking a "crew commander" should not be referred to as a "rank" but a job role, or position within the Fire Service.

The new 'role' came into general usage during 2006 - the equivalent rank was known as leading firefighter.

== Differences between the term "crew manager" and "crew commander" ==
There is no difference in the term "crew commander" and "crew manager". They are the same "rank" or role. A "crew commander" is simply referred to as "crew manager" when on station engaged in daily administrative duties, or non-emergency situations. The "crew manager" is then referred to as "crew commander" when responding to / dealing with incidents or on the fire ground.

Some firefighters dislike the use of the term "manager", as it implies an administrative role rather than a front-line role.

== Ranks to roles ==
Confusingly, firefighters and fire officers still wear markings on their uniforms to identify their role and status or seniority in the Fire Service. This has caused many firefighters and officers to question what "rank to roles" has really achieved.

The new ranks to roles system have caused some confusion amongst firefighters on the fire ground, and from an administrative point of view at officer level. For instance, a firefighter would have traditionally known that a divisional officer was a high-ranking officer in the brigade and should be addressed as "Sir" or "Ma'am" (and sometimes should be saluted). However, some divisional officers are now known under "role names".

In the old rank system, there would have been a "divisional officer" responsible for training new recruits, or a divisional officer in the fire safety department. Clearly both officers are of the same rank but perform different roles.

The new regime tries to resolve this by calling the divisional officer responsible for recruit training a "training manager" whilst the divisional officer in fire safety is a "fire safety manager".

== Previous ranks and their present equivalents ==
- Station officer - now referred to as watch commander (B) - 2 impellers on epaulettes
- Sub-officer - now referred to as watch commander (A) - sub officer used to have two silver bars on epaulettes but the new watch commander A role has two impellers on epaulettes, the same as a watch commander (B)
- Leading firefighter - now referred to as crew commander - leading firefighter used to display one silver bar on epaulettes, crew commander has two bars on epaulettes
- Firefighters - no change
