= Comparative army enlisted ranks of Africa =

Rank comparison chart of enlisted rank for armies/ land forces of African states.

== Enlisted ==
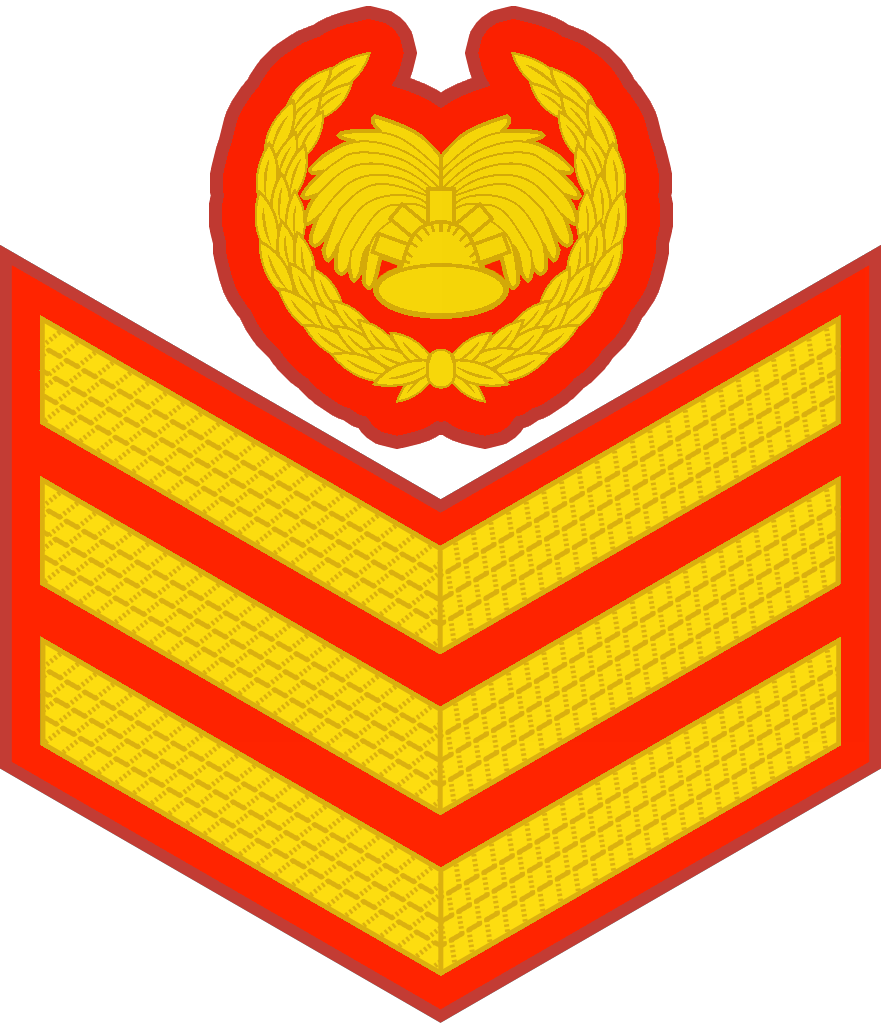
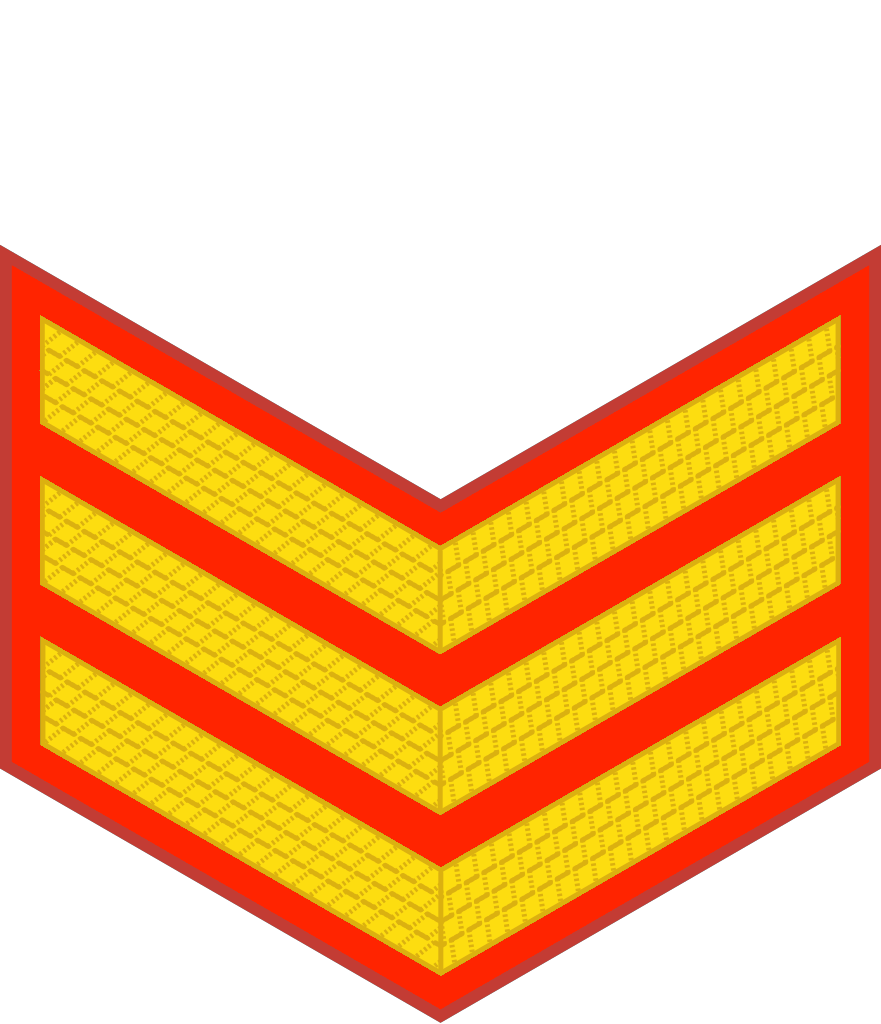
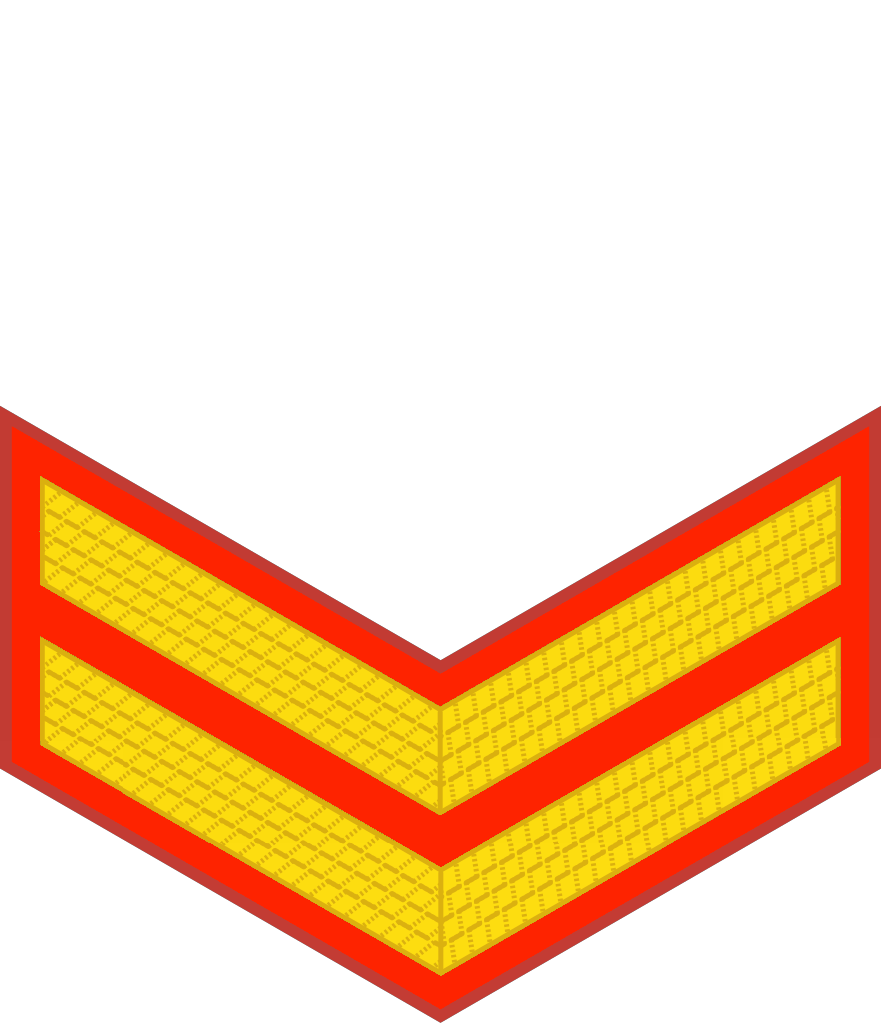
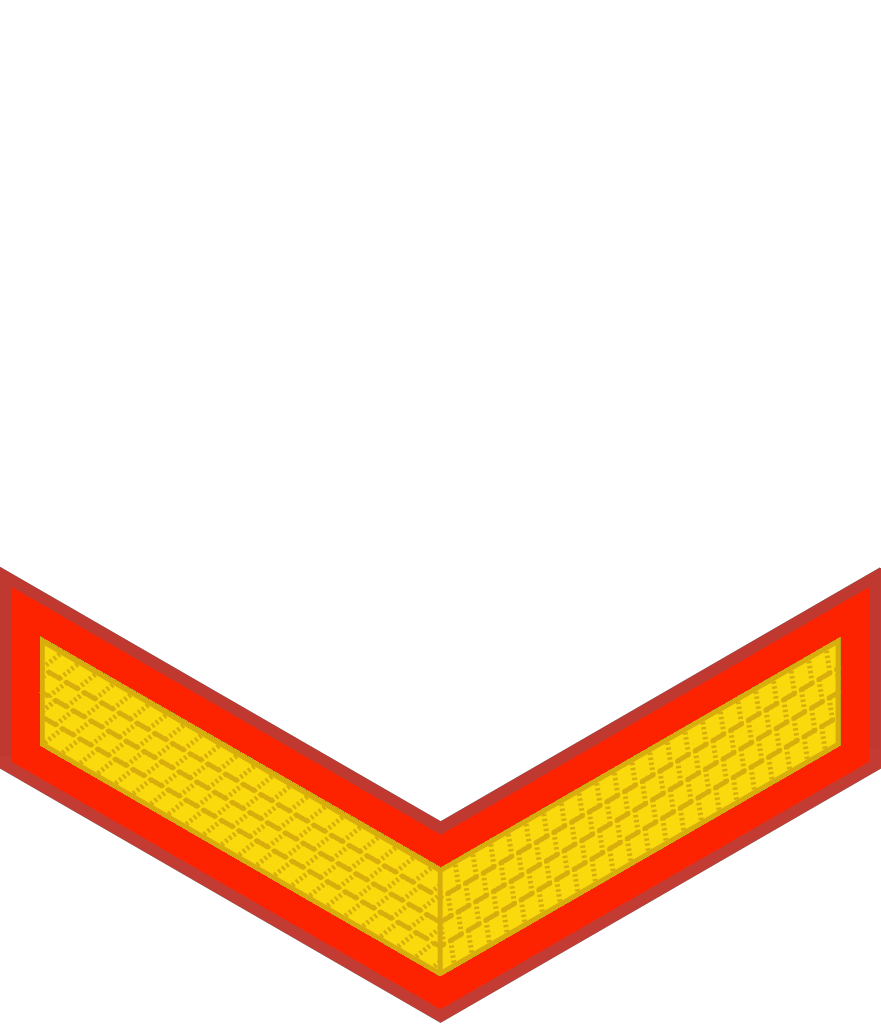
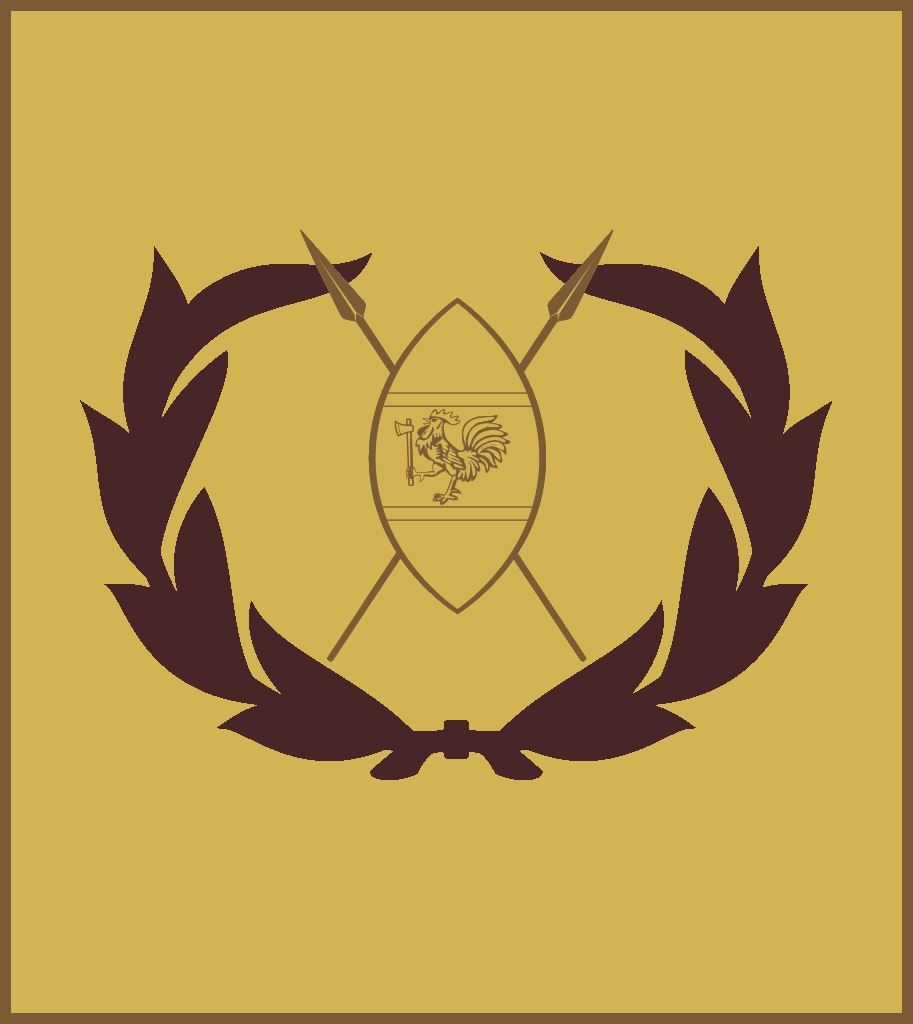
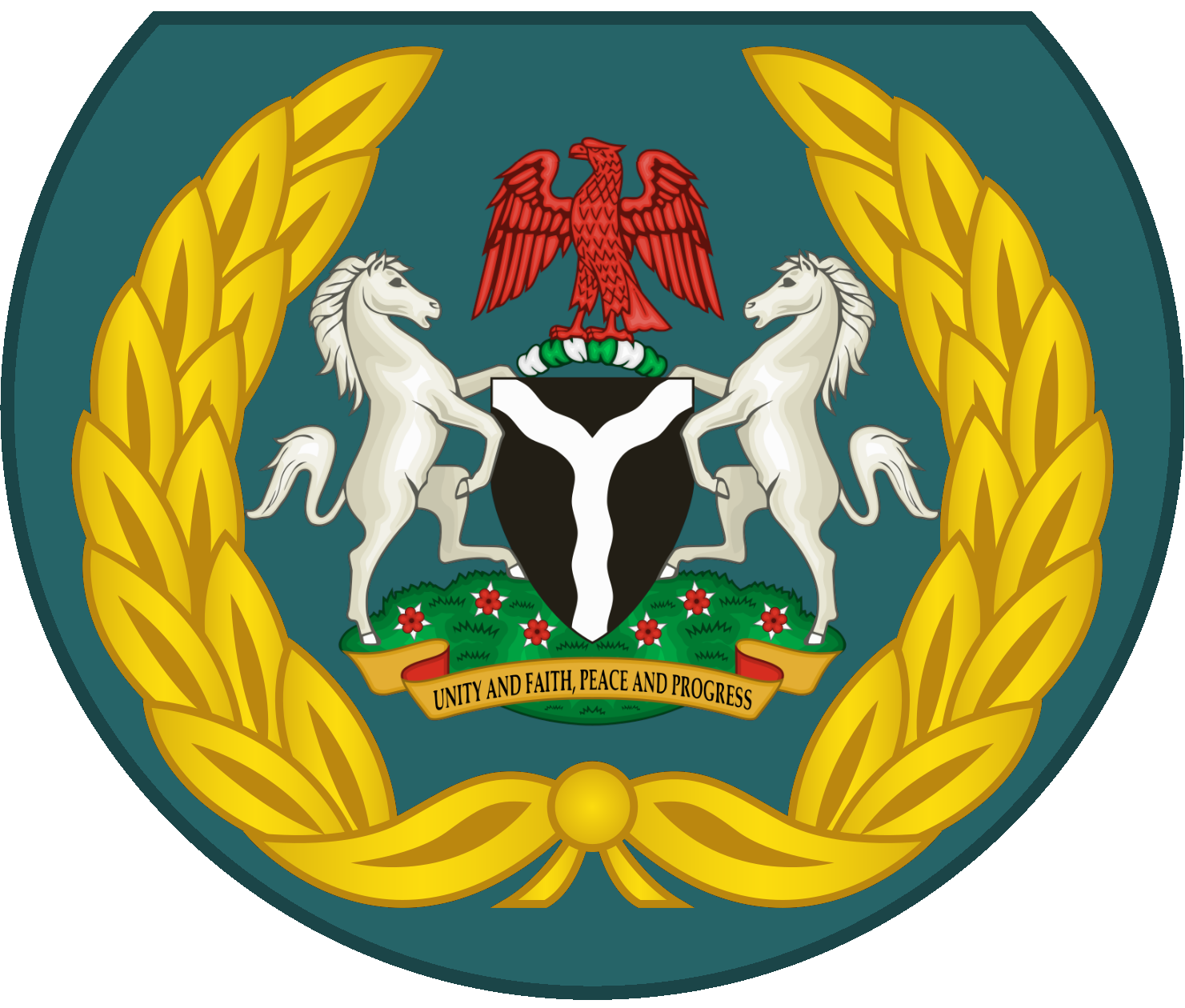
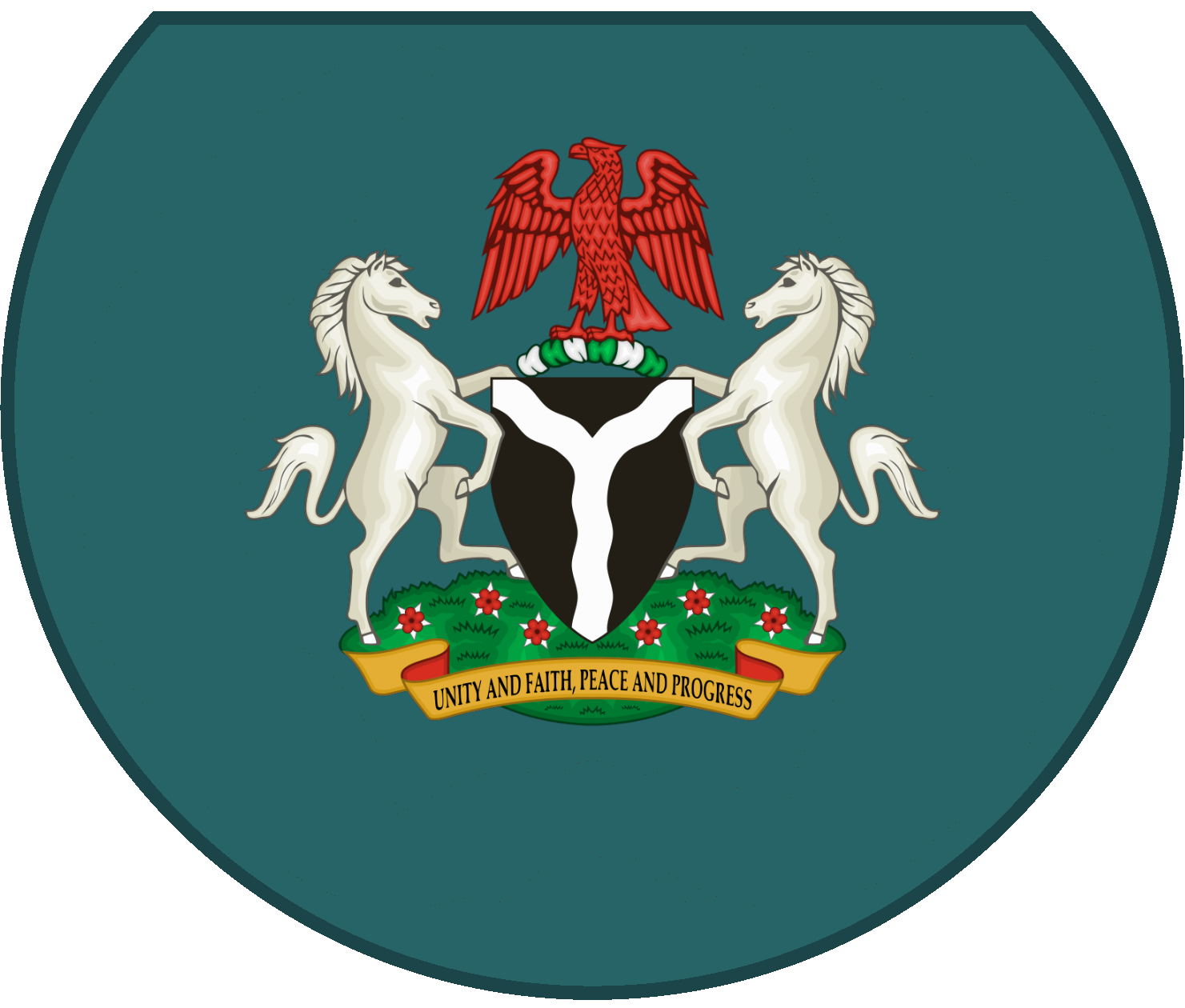
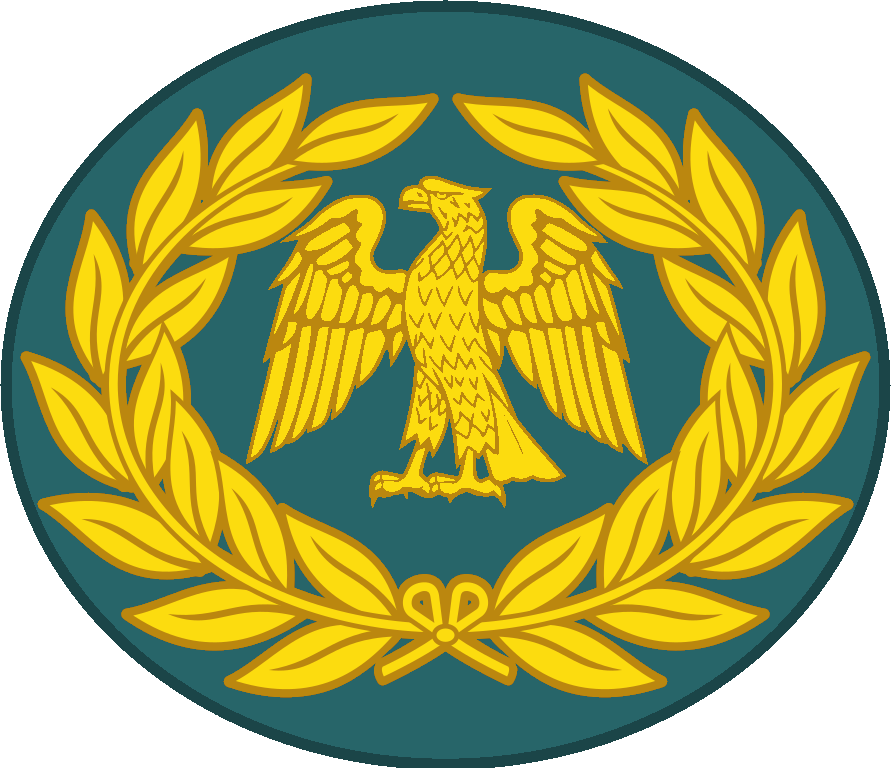
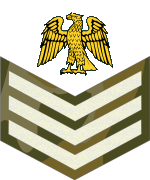
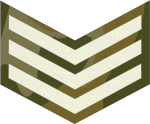
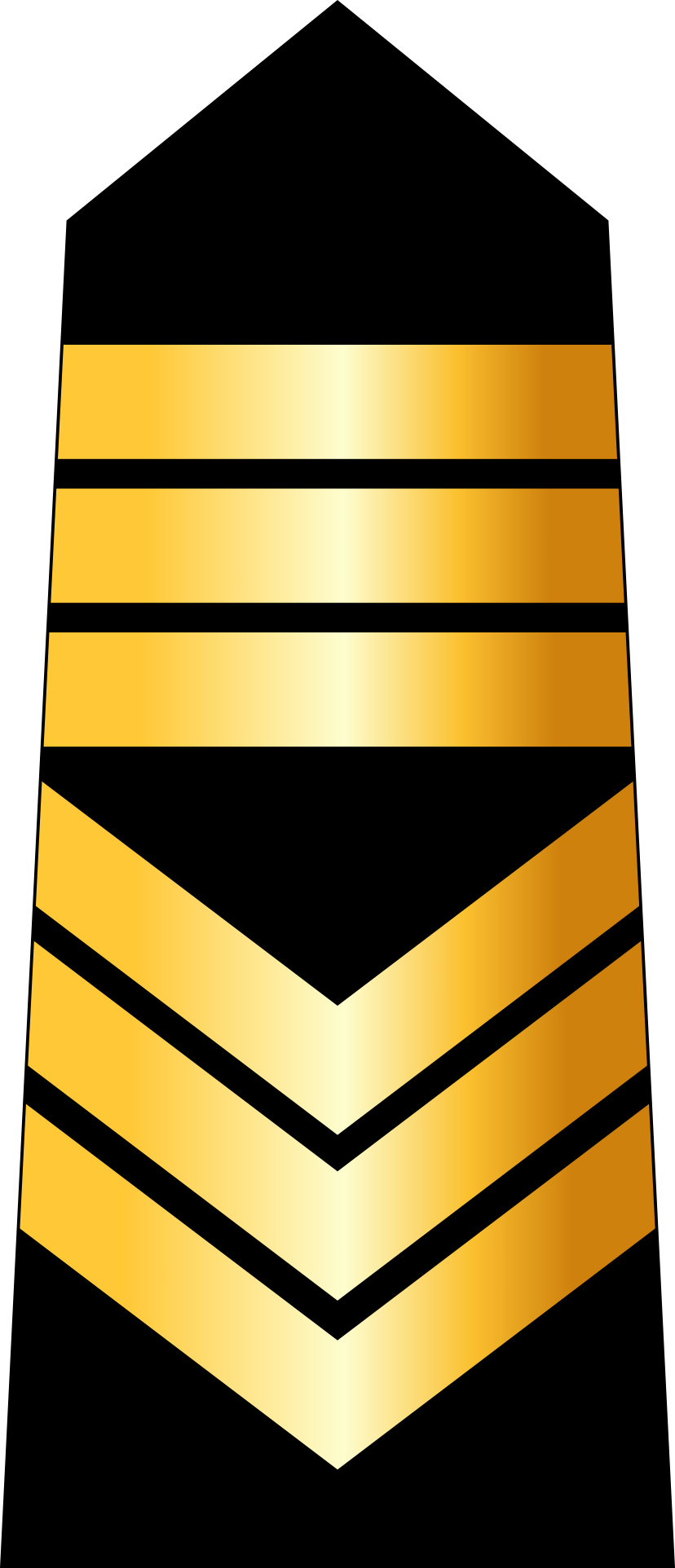
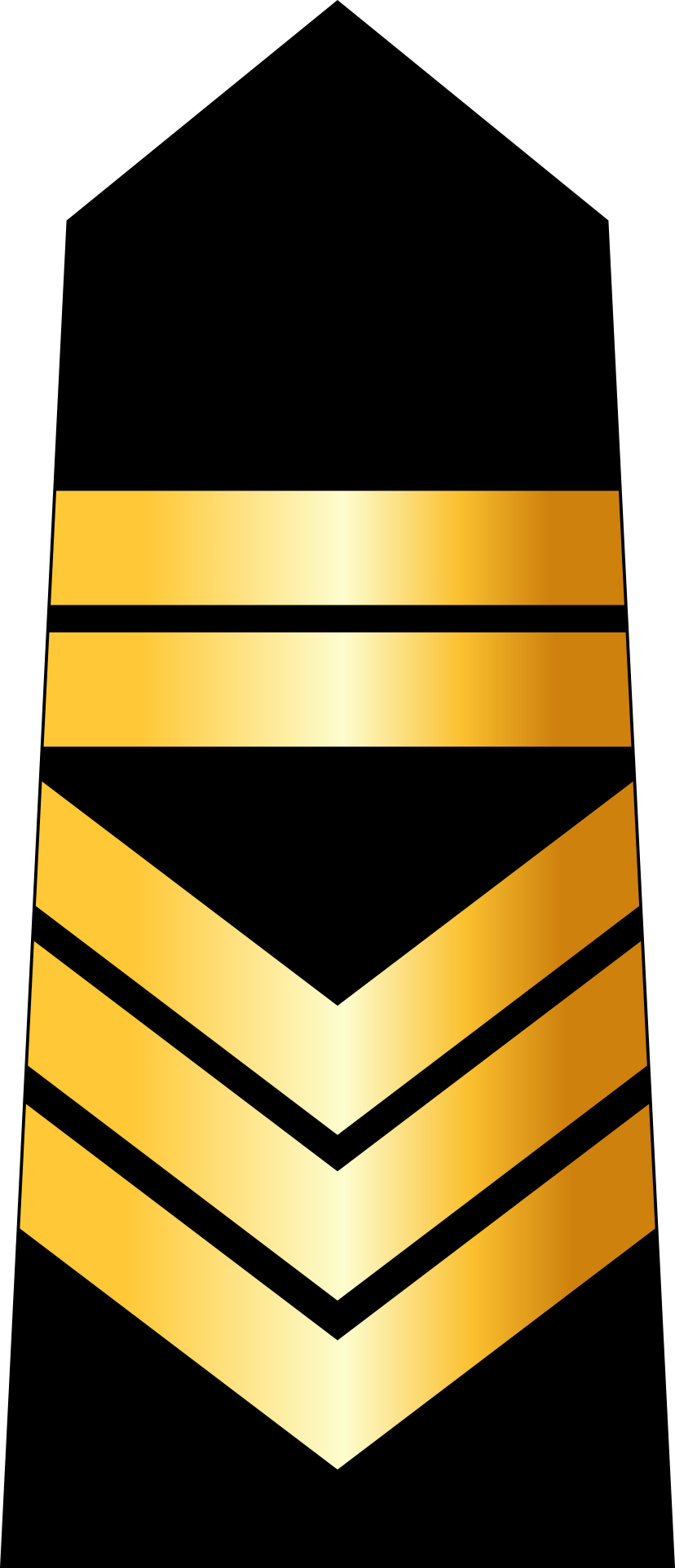
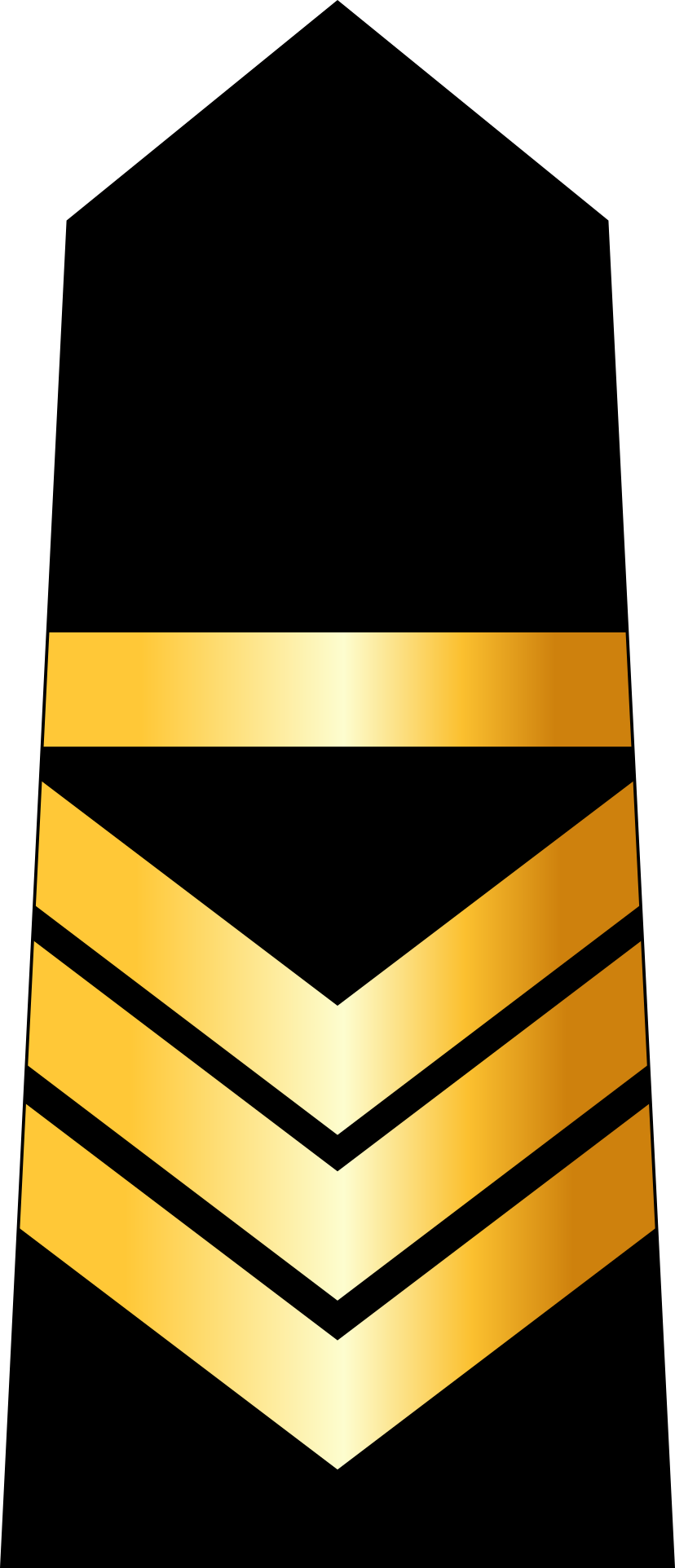
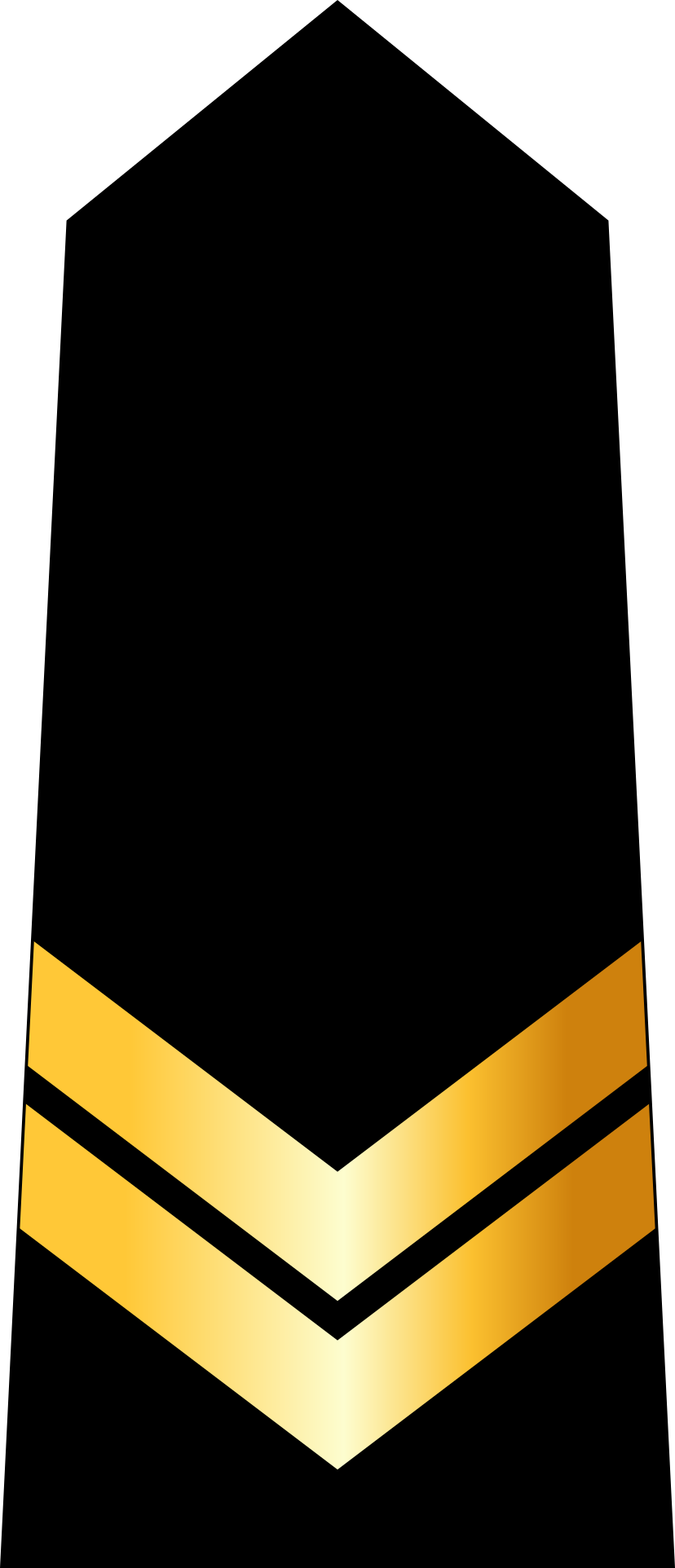
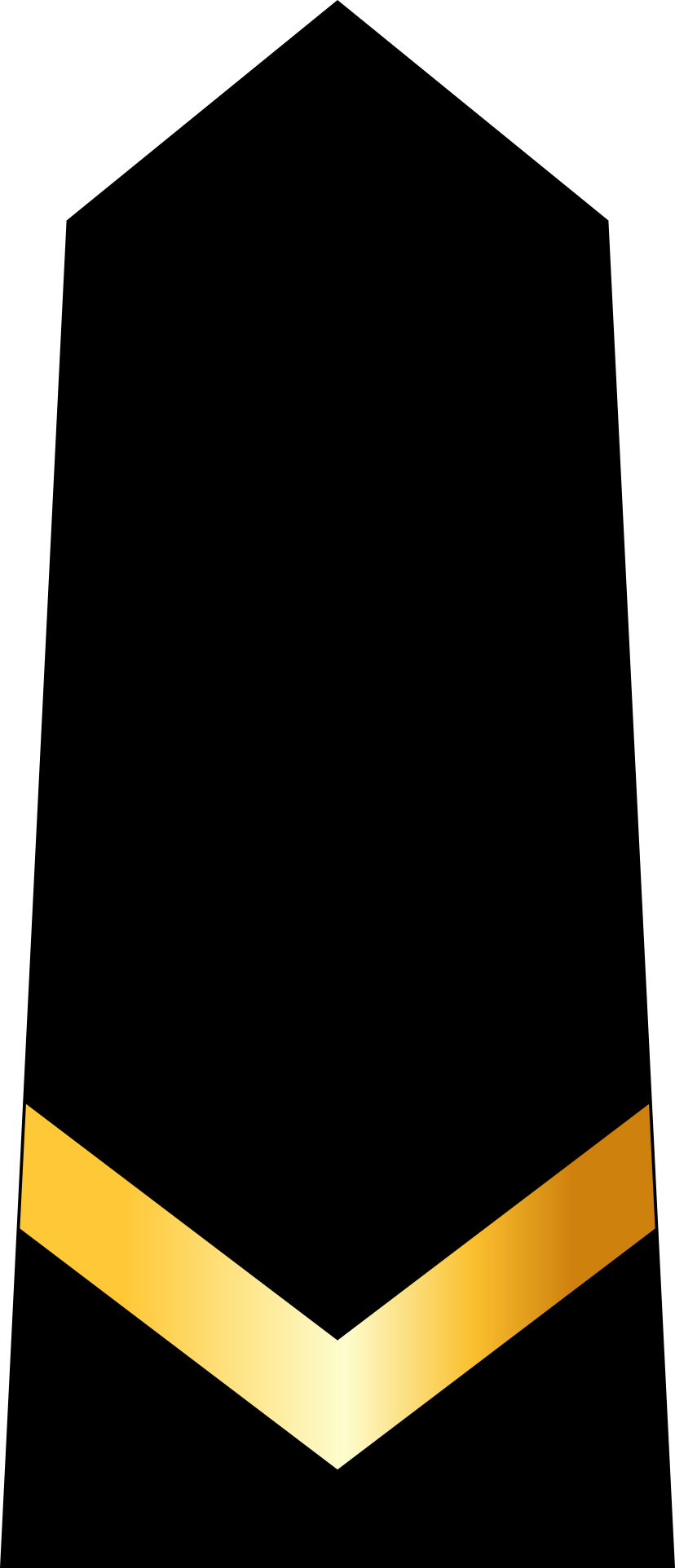
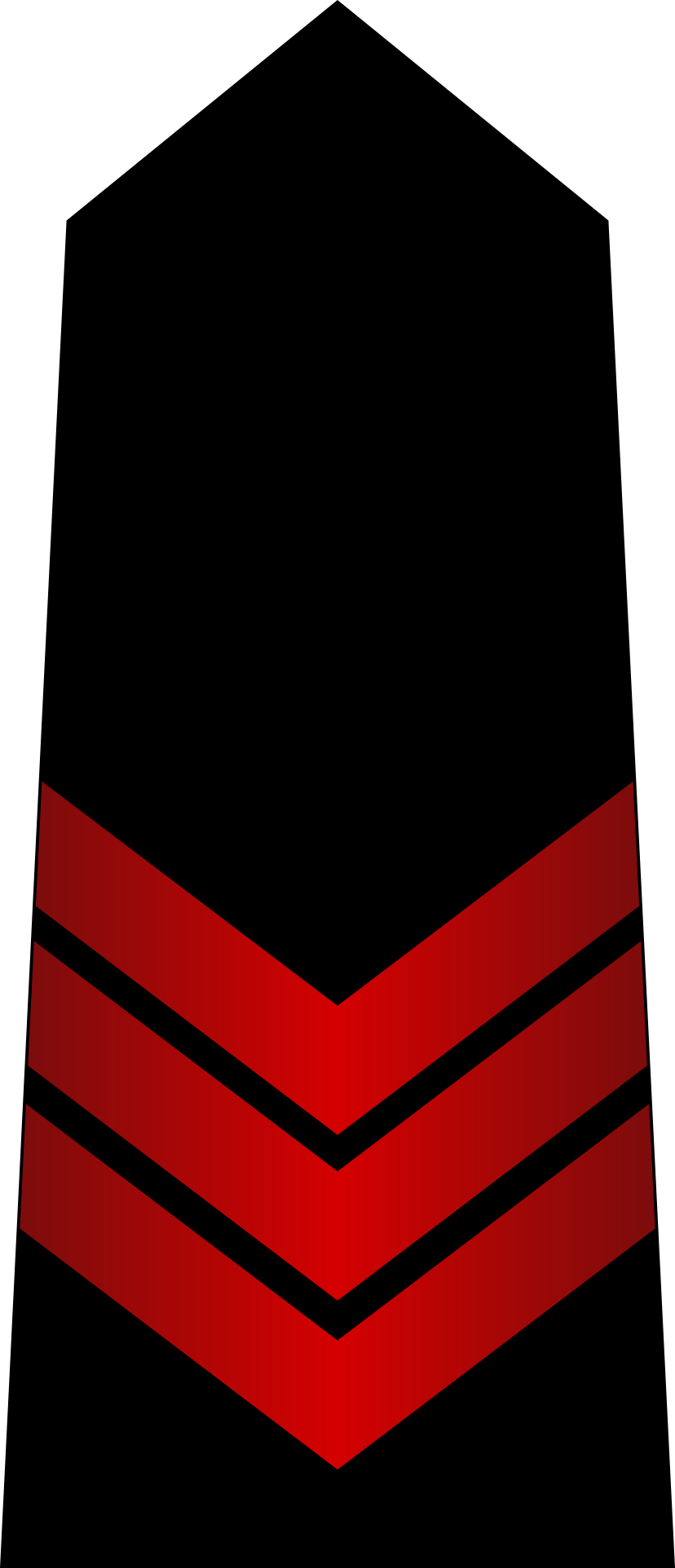
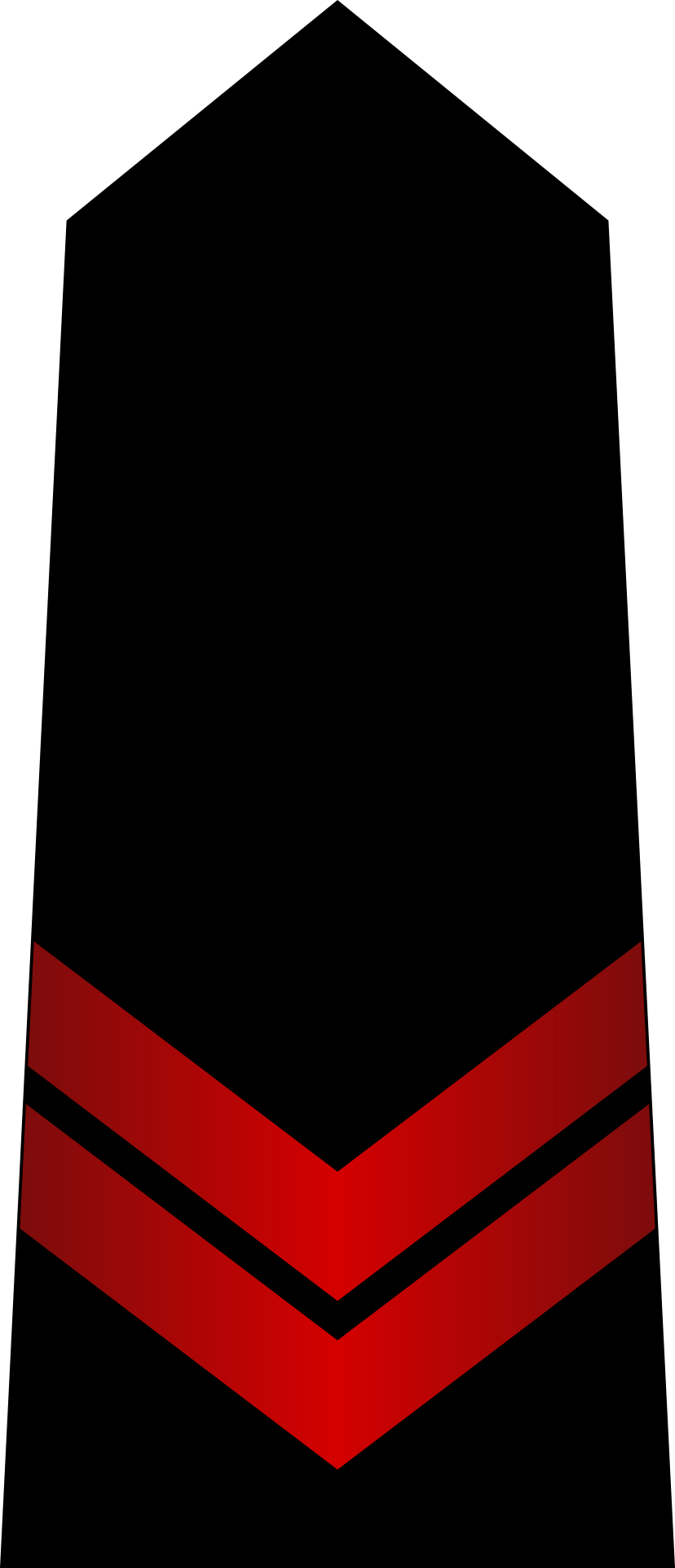
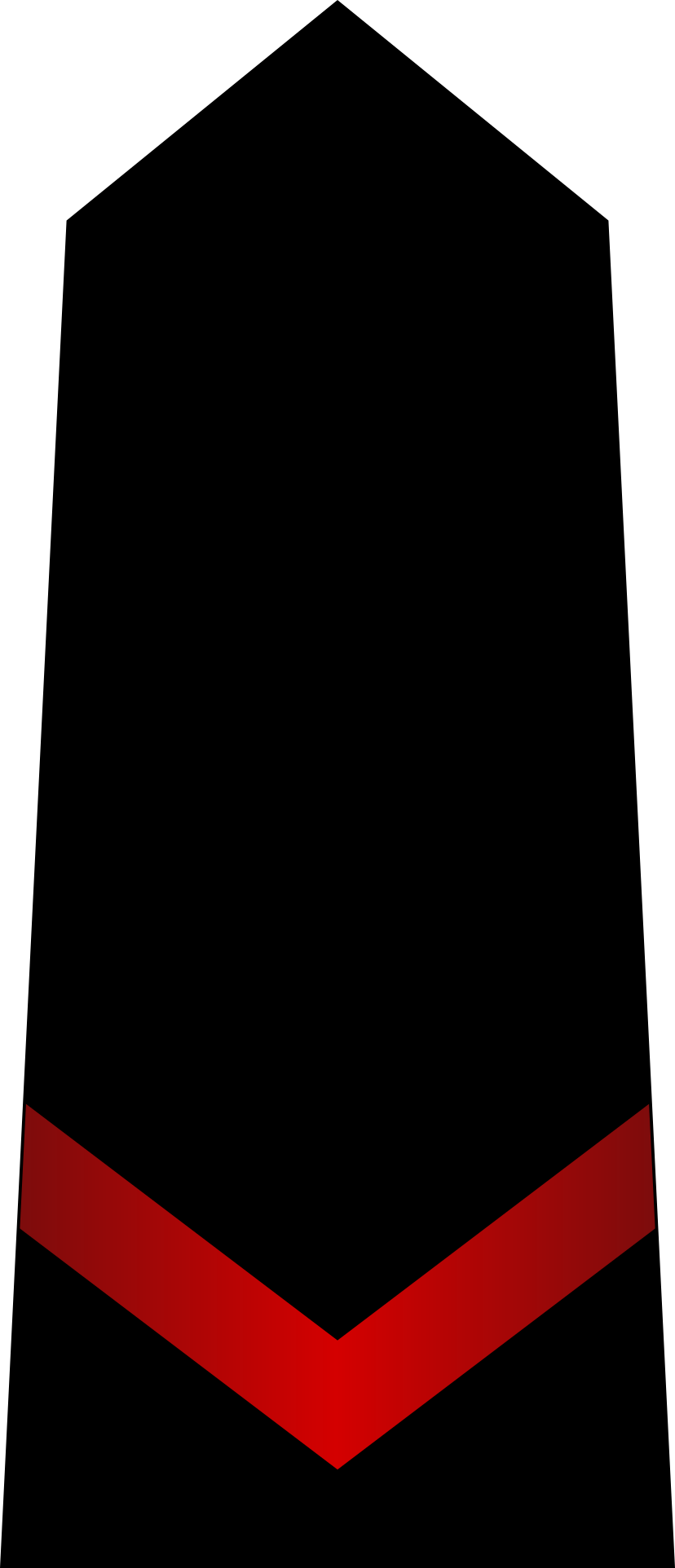
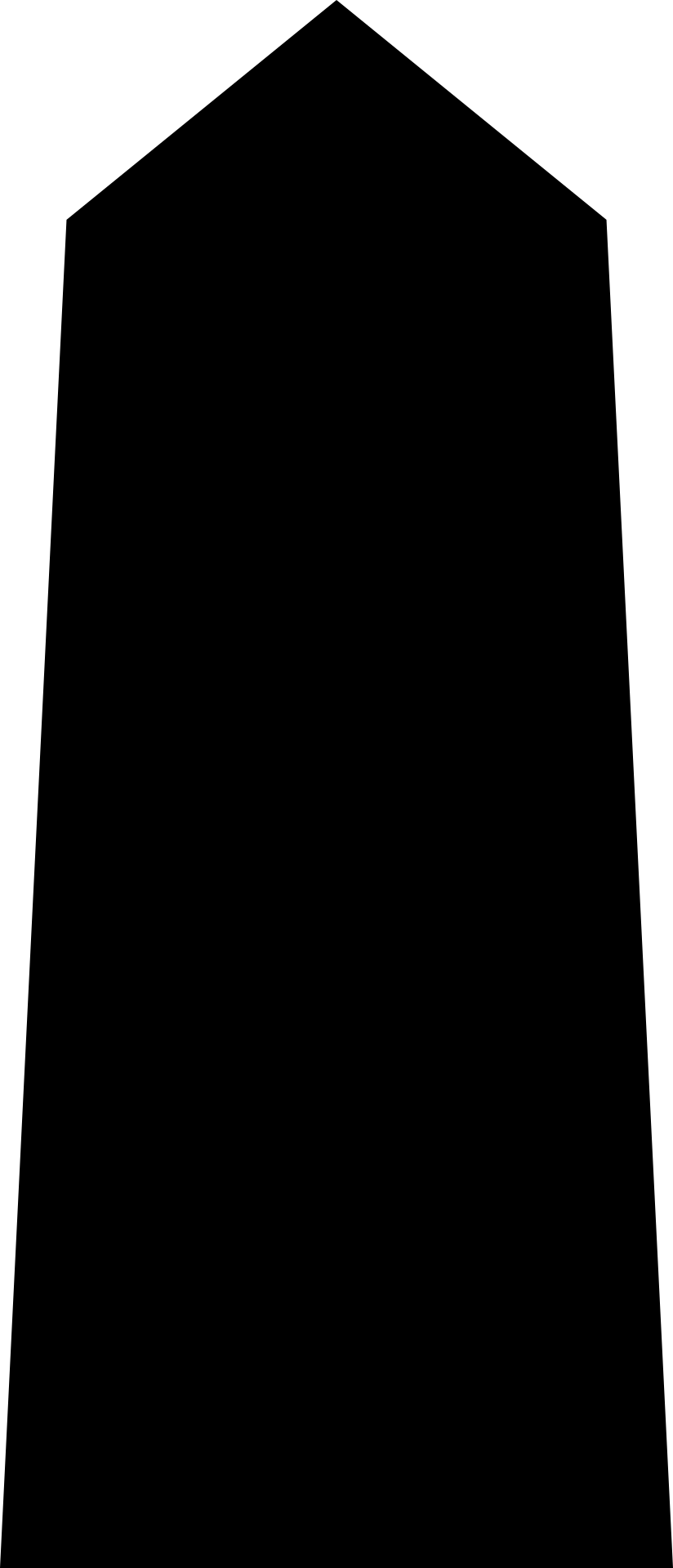
Rank group	Senior NCOs										Junior NCOs			Enlisted
Algerian Land Forces																No insignia
Algerian Land Forces	مساعد أول; Mosa'id awwal		مساعد; Mosa'id			رقيب أول; Raqib awwal	رقيب; Raqib				عريف أول; Earif 'awal		عريف; Earif			جندي; Jundiun
Algerian Land Forces	Adjudant-chef		Adjudant			Sergent-chef	Sergent				Caporal-chef		Caporal			Djoundi
Angolan Army																No insignia
Angolan Army	Sargento-mor		Sargento-chefe	Sargento-ajudante		Primeiro-sargento	Segundo-sargento				Sub-sargento			Primeiro-cabo	Segundo-cabo	Soldado
Benin Army
Benin Army	Major	Adjudant-chef	Adjudant			Sergent-chef	Sergent				Caporal-chef		Caporal	Soldat de 1^{ère} classe		Soldat de 2^{ème} classe
Botswana Ground Force														No insignia
Botswana Ground Force	Warrant officer class 1		Warrant officer class 2	Staff sergeant		Sergeant					Corporal		Lance corporal	Private (or equivalent)
Burkina Faso Ground Forces
Burkina Faso Ground Forces	Adjudant-chef major	Adjudant-chef	Adjudant			Sergent-chef/ Maréchal-des-logis-chef	Sergent/ Maréchal-des-logis				Caporal-chef/ Brigadier-chef		Caporal/ Brigadier	Soldat de première classe		Soldat de deuxeme classe
Burundi Army																No insignia
Burundi Army	Adjudant-major	Adjudant-chef	Adjudant	Première sergent major		Première sergent	Sergent				Caporal-chef		Caporal	Soldat de 1^{ère} classe		Soldat de 2^{ème} classe
Burundi Army	Ajida shefu	Ajida majoro	Ajida	Sereja majoro mu murwi wa mbere		Sereja mu murwi wa mbere	Sereja				Kaporari shefu		Kaporari	Umusoda wo mu murwi wa mbere		Umusoda wo mu murwi wa kabiri
Cameroon Ground Forces
Cameroon Ground Forces	Adjudant-chef		Adjudant			Sergent-chef	Sergent				Caporal-chef		Caporal	Soldat première		Soldat
Cape Verdean National Guard																	No insignia
Cape Verdean National Guard	Sargento-mor		Sargento-chefe	Sargento-principal		Primeiro-sargento	Segundo-sargento	Sargento	Furriel	Instruendo curso de sargento	Cabo-principal	Cabo de Secção	Cabo-adjunto	Primeiro-cabo	Segundo-cabo	Instruendo curso de cabo	Soldado
(Central African Republic) Central African Ground Forces																No insignia
(Central African Republic) Central African Ground Forces	Adjudant-chef		Adjudant	Sergent-major		Sergent-chef	Sergent				Caporal-chef		Caporal	Soldat première		Soldat
Chadian Ground Forces																No insignia
Chadian Ground Forces				Sergent major		Sergent-chef	Sergent						Caporal	Soldat première		Soldat
Comorian Army
Comorian Army	Adjudant-chef		Adjudant			Sergent-chef	Sergent				Caporal-chef		Caporal	Soldat de 1^{ère} classe		Soldat
Land Forces of the DR Congo																No insignia
Land Forces of the DR Congo	Adjudant-chef	Adjudant de première classe	Adjudant	Premier sergent major	Sergent major	Premier sergent	Sergent						Caporal	Soldat de première classe		Soldat de seconde classe	Recrue
Rank group	Senior NCOs										Junior NCOs			Enlisted
Congolese Ground Forces																No insignia
Congolese Ground Forces	Adjudant-chef		Adjudant			Sergent-chef	Sergent				Caporal-chef		Caporal	Soldat 1^{ère} classe		Soldat 2^{e} classe
Djiboutian Army
Djiboutian Army	Major	Adjudant-chef	Adjudant			Sergent-chef	Sergent				Caporal-chef		Caporal	Soldat de 1^{ère} classe		Soldat de 2^{ème} classe
Egyptian Army
Egyptian Army	مساعد أول; Mosa'id awwal		مساعد; Mosa'id	رقيب أول; Raqib awwal		رقيب; Raqib					عريف 'arif			جندي; Jundi
Army of Equatorial Guinea
Army of Equatorial Guinea			Brigada	Sargento primero		Sarjento					Cabo primero		Cabo			Soldado
Eritrean Army																No insignia
Eritrean Army			Master Sergeant			Staff Sergeant	Sergeant				Corporal			Private first class		Private
Umbutfo Eswatini Defence Force																No insignia
Umbutfo Eswatini Defence Force	Warrant officer I		Warrant officer II			Staff Sergeant	Sergeant				Corporal		Lance Corporal			Private
Ethiopian Army																No insignia
Ethiopian Army			ሻለቃ ባሻ; Shalek’a basha	ሻለቃ መጋቢ ባሻ; Shalek’a megabī basha		ሻምበል ባሻ; Shamibeli basha	መጋቢ ሀምሳ ዓለቃ; Megabī hāmisa ‘alek’a				ሀምሳ ዓለቃ; Hāmisa ‘alek’a		አስር ዓለቃ; Āsiri ‘alek’a	ምክትል አስር ዓለቃ; Mikitili āsiri ‘alek’a		መሠረታዊ ወታዯር; Mešeretawī wetaderi
Gabonese Army
Gabonese Army	Adjudant-chef major	Adjudant-chef	Adjudant			Sergent-chef	Sergent				Caporal-chef		Caporal	Soldat première		Soldat
Gambian National Army														No insignia
Gambian National Army	Warrant officer class 1		Warrant officer class 2	Staff sergeant		Sergeant					Corporal		Lance corporal	Private (or equivalent)
Ghana Army														No insignia
Ghana Army	Warrant officer class 1		Warrant officer class 2	Staff sergeant		Sergeant					Corporal		Lance corporal	Private (or equivalent)
Guinea Ground Forces
Guinea Ground Forces	Major	Adjudant-chef	Adjudant			Sergent-chef	Sergent				Caporal-chef		Caporal	Soldat de 1^{ère} classe		Soldat de 2^{ème} classe
Army of Guinea-Bissau
Army of Guinea-Bissau						Primeiro-sargento	Segundo-sargento				Terceiro-sargento			Primeiro-Soldado		Soldado
Ivory Coast Ground Forces
Ivory Coast Ground Forces	Adjudant-chef major	Adjudant-chef	Adjudant			Sergent-chef	Sergent				Caporal-chef		Caporal	Soldat de première classe		Soldat de seconde classe
Kenya Army														No insignia
Kenya Army	Warrant officer class 1		Warrant officer class 2	Senior sergeant		Sergeant					Corporal		Lance corporal	Private (or equivalent)
Lesotho Army														No insignia
Lesotho Army	Warrant officer class 1		Warrant officer class 2	Staff sergeant		Sergeant					Corporal		Lance corporal	Private (or equivalent)
Liberian Ground Forces																No insignia
Liberian Ground Forces	Command sergeant major		Master sergeant	Sergeant first class		Staff sergeant	Sergeant				Corporal		Private first class	Private		Private
Rank group	Senior NCOs										Junior NCOs			Enlisted
Libyan Ground Forces																No insignia
Libyan Ground Forces			Master Sergeant			Staff Sergeant	Sergeant				Corporal			Private 1st Class		Private
Madagascar Ground Forces																No insignia
Madagascar Ground Forces	Adjudant-major	Adjudant-chef	Adjudant	Sergent-major		Sergent-chef	Sergent				Caporal-chef		Caporal			Soldat
Malawi Army														No insignia
Malawi Army	Warrant officer class 1		Warrant officer class 2	Staff sergeant		Sergeant					Corporal		Lance corporal	Private (or equivalent)
Malian Army
Malian Army	Major	Adjudant-chef	Adjudant			Sergent-chef	Sergent				Caporal-chef		Caporal	Soldat de première classe		Soldat
Mauritanian National Army
Mauritanian National Army	مساعد أول; Mosa'id awwal		مساعد; Mosa'id			رقيب أول; Raqib awwal	رقيب; Raqib						عريف 'arif			جندي; Jundiun
Mauritius	No army
Royal Moroccan Army
Royal Moroccan Army	Mosa'id 'awwal		mosa'id	Raqid thani		Raqid 'awwal	Raqid				Earif 'awwal		Earif	Jundiun 'awwal		Jundium
Royal Moroccan Army	Adjudant-chef		Adjudant	Sergent-major		Sergent-chef	Sergent				Caporal-chef		Caporal	Soldat de première classe		Soldat de deuxième classe
Mozambican Army
Mozambican Army				Intendente		Primeiro-sargento	Segundo-sargento				Terceiro-sargento		Cabo	Primeiro soldado
Namibian Army														No insignia
Namibian Army	Warrant officer class 1		Warrant officer class 2	Staff sergeant		Sergeant					Corporal		Lance corporal	Private (or equivalent)
Niger Army
Niger Army	Major	Adjudant-chef	Adjudant			Sergent-chef	Sergent				Caporal-chef		Caporal	Soldat de 1^{re} classe		Soldat de 2^{e} classe
Nigerian Army														No insignia
Nigerian Army	Army warrant officer	Master warrant officer	Warrant officer	Staff sergeant		Sergeant					Corporal		Lance corporal	Private (or equivalent)
Rwandan Land Forces																No insignia
Rwandan Land Forces	Warrant officer I		Warrant officer II	Sergeant major		Staff sergeant	Sergeant						Corporal			Private
Rank group	Senior NCOs										Junior NCOs			Enlisted
Army of São Tomé and Príncipe
Army of São Tomé and Príncipe	Sargento-mor		Sargento-chefe	Sargento-ajudante		Primeiro-sargento	Segundo-sargento	Furriel		Segundo-furriel	Cabo de Secção		Cabo-adjunto	Primeiro-cabo	Segundo-cabo	Soldado
Senegalese Army																No insignia
Senegalese Army	Adjudant-chef		Adjudant			Sergent-chef	Sergent				Caporal-chef		Caporal	Soldat de première classe		Soldat
Seychelles Army														No insignia
Seychelles Army	Warrant officer class 1		Warrant officer class 2	Staff sergeant		Sergeant					Corporal		Lance corporal	Private (or equivalent)
Sierra Leone Army														No insignia
Sierra Leone Army	Warrant officer class 1		Warrant officer class 2	Staff sergeant		Sergeant					Corporal		Lance corporal	Private (or equivalent)
Somali National Army														No insignia
Somali National Army	Musharax sarkaal	Sadex xarígle	Laba xarígle	Xarígle		Sadex alífle					Laba alífle		Alífle	Dable
Somaliland National Army
Somaliland National Army	Chief warrant officer Musharax sarkaal	Warrant officer class 1 Sadex xarígle	Warrant officer class 2 Laba xarígle	Warrant officer class 3 Xarígle		Sergeant; Sadex alífle					Corporal; Laba alífle		Lance corporal Alífle	Private (or equivalent); Dable
South African Army														No insignia
South African Army	Warrant officer class 1		Warrant officer class 2	Staff sergeant		Sergeant					Corporal		Lance corporal	Private (or equivalent)
Sudanese Army														No insignia
Sudanese Army			مساعد; Mosa'id	رقيب أول; Raqib awwal		رقيب; Raqib					عريف 'arif		وكيل عريف; Wakil 'arif	جندي; Jundiun
South Sudan Army
South Sudan Army	Regimental sergeant major		Sergeant major			Sergeant					Corporal		Lance corporal	Private
Tanzanian Army														No insignia
Tanzanian Army	Afisa mteule daraja la kwanza		Afisa mteule daraja la pili	Sajinitaji		Sajenti					Koplo		Koplo usu	Mtu ndege
Togolese Army																No insignia
Togolese Army	Major	Adjudant-chef	Adjudant			Sergent-chef	Sergent				Caporal-chef		Caporal	Soldat de 1^{ère} classe		Soldat de 2^{ème} classe
Tunisian Army
Tunisian Army	وكيل أعلى; Wakil 'aelaa	وكيل أول; Wakil 'awal	وكيل; Wakil			عريف أول; Earif 'awal	عريف; Earif				رقيب أول; Raqib 'awal		رقيب; Raqib	جندي أول; Jundiun awwal		جندي متطوع; Jundiun
Tunisian Army	Major	Adjudant-chef	Adjudant			Sergent-chef	Sergent				Caporal-chef		Caporal	Soldat de 1^{re} classe		Soldat
Ugandan Land Forces														No insignia
Ugandan Land Forces	Warrant officer class 1		Warrant officer class 2	Staff sergeant		Sergeant					Corporal		Lance corporal	Private (or equivalent)
Zambian Army														No insignia
Zambian Army	Warrant officer class 1		Warrant officer class 2	Staff sergeant		Sergeant					Corporal		Lance corporal	Private (or equivalent)
Zimbabwe National Army														No insignia
Zimbabwe National Army	Regimental sergeant major	Warrant officer class 1	Warrant officer class 2	Staff sergeant		Sergeant					Corporal		Lance corporal	Private (or equivalent)
Rank group	Senior NCOs										Junior NCOs			Enlisted

== See also ==
- Comparative army enlisted ranks of the Commonwealth
- Ranks and insignia of NATO armies enlisted
