= Comparative army enlisted ranks of the Americas =

Rank comparison chart of armies/ land forces of North and South American states.

== Enlisted ==
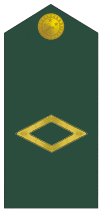
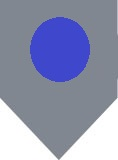
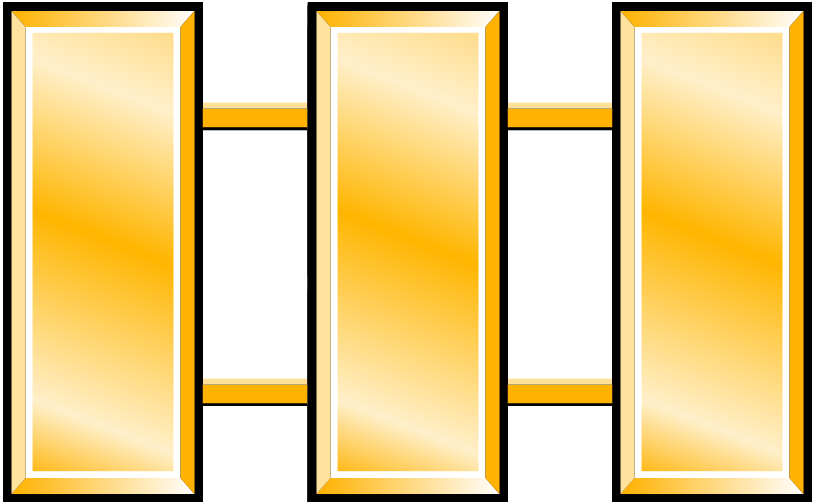
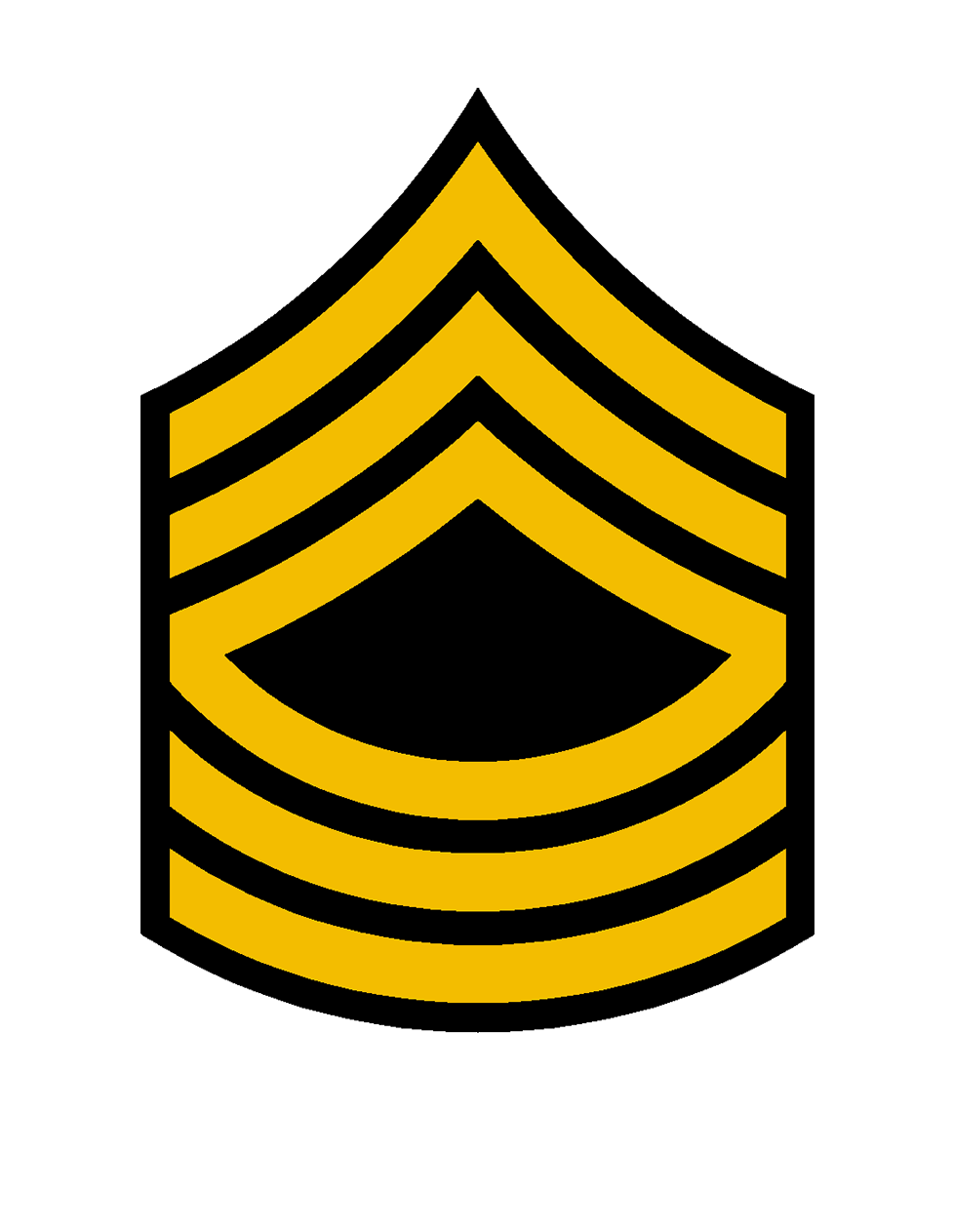
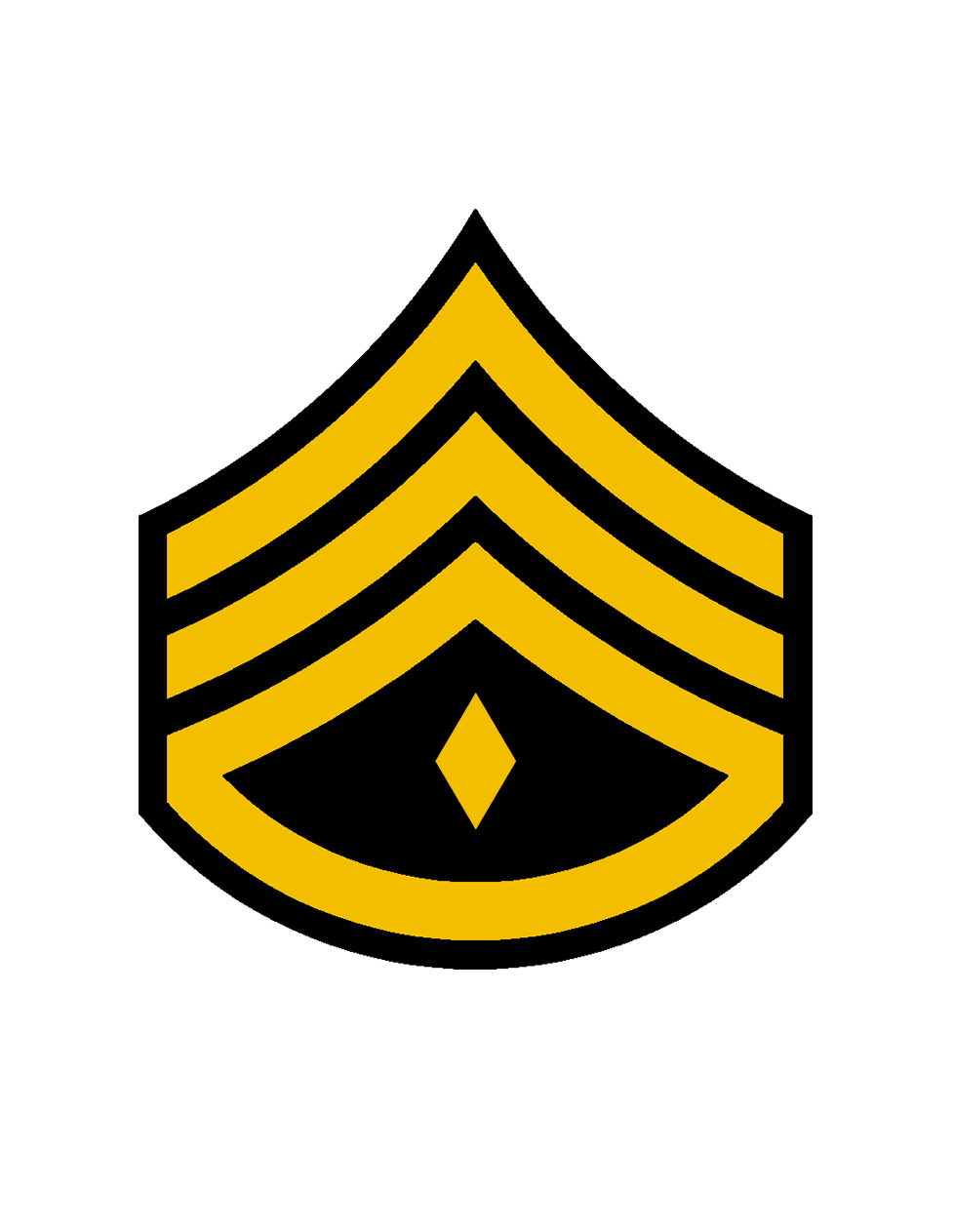
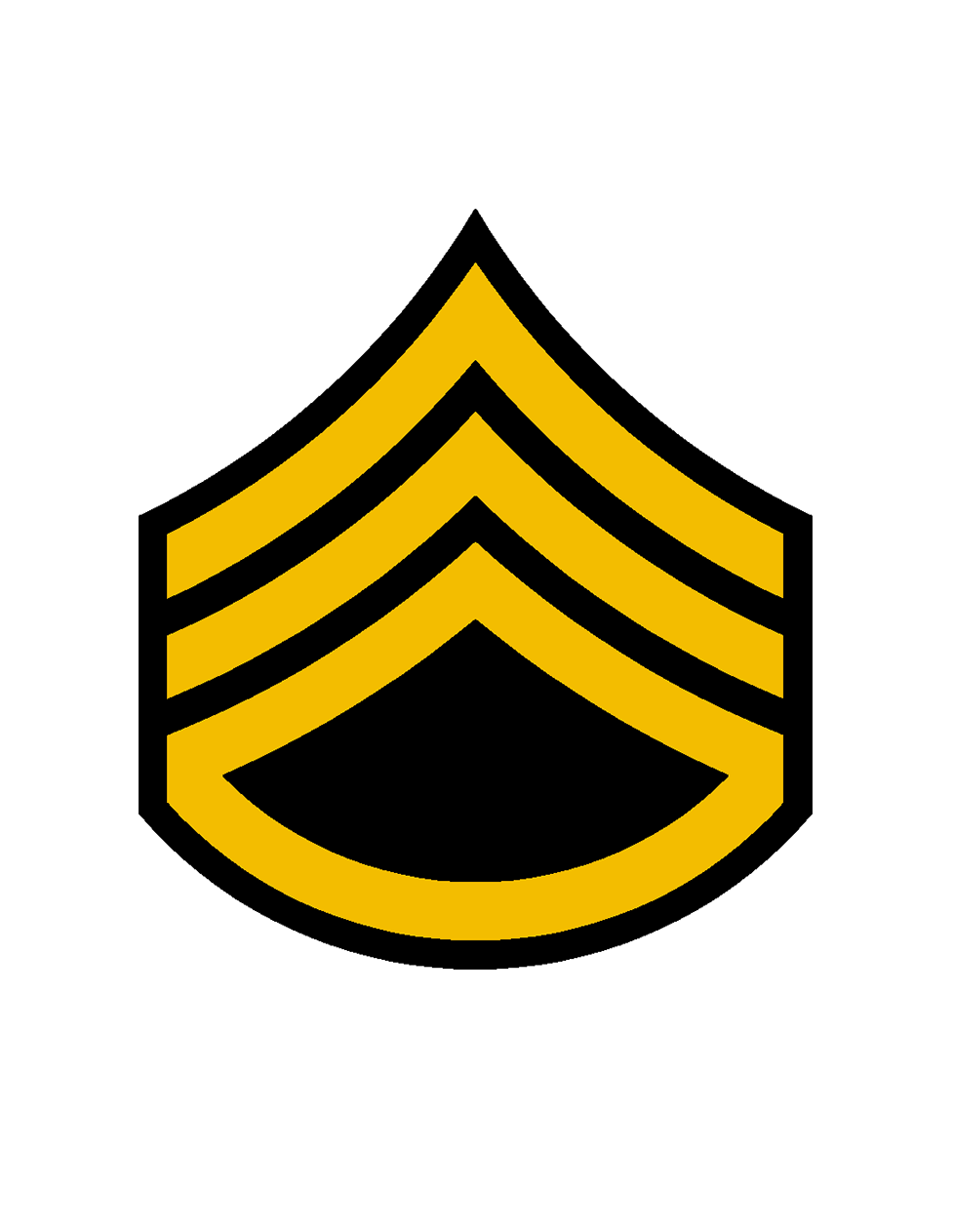
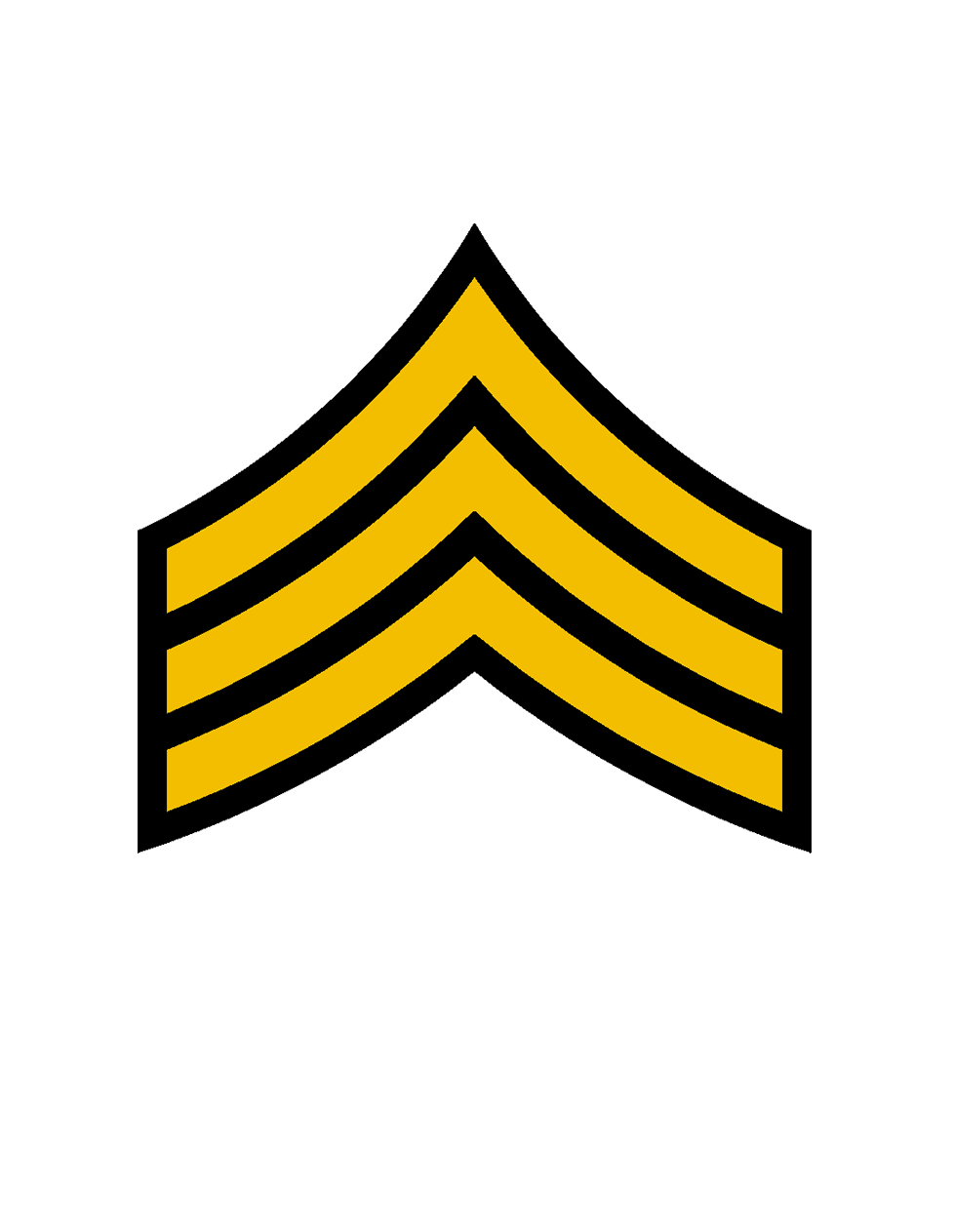
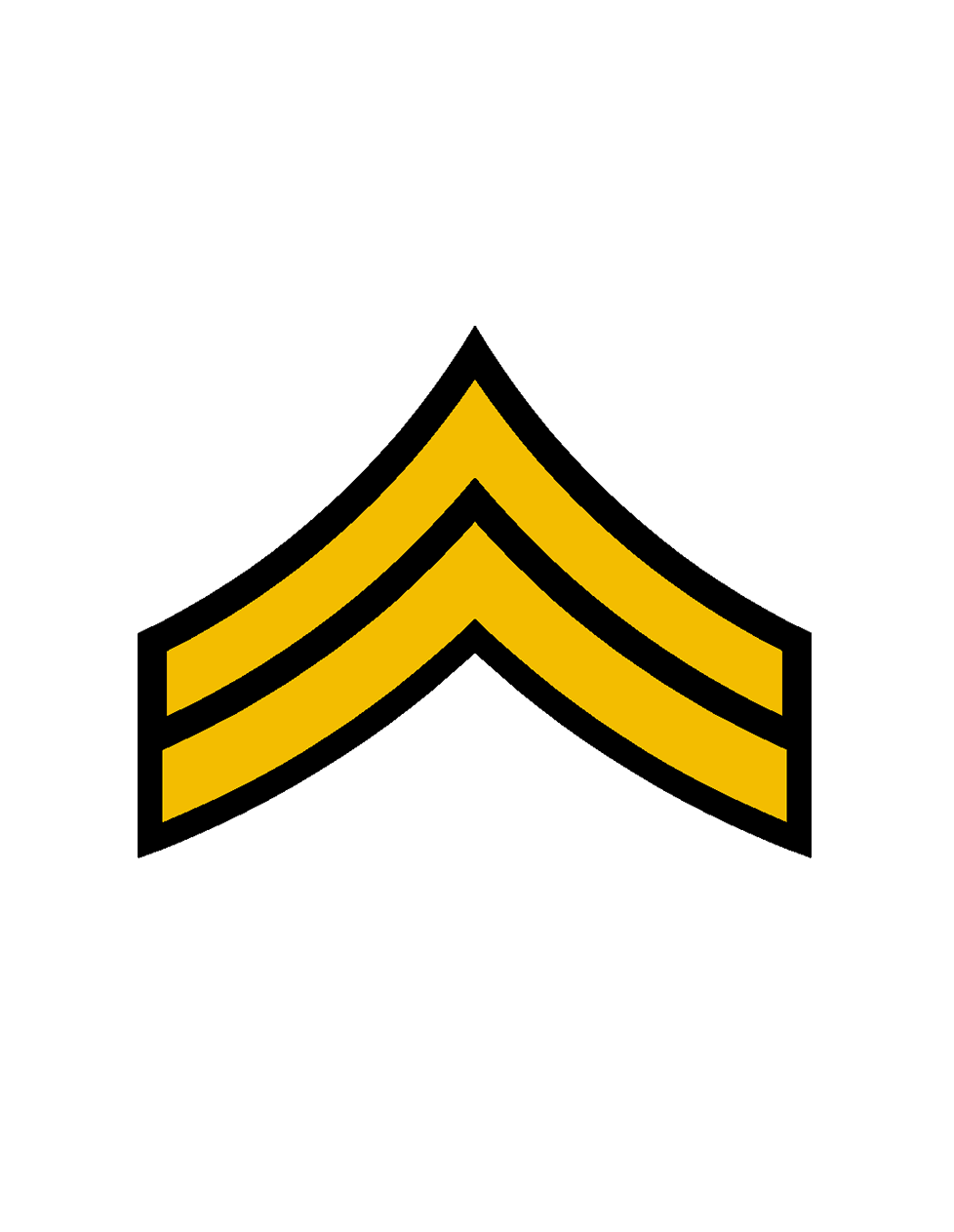
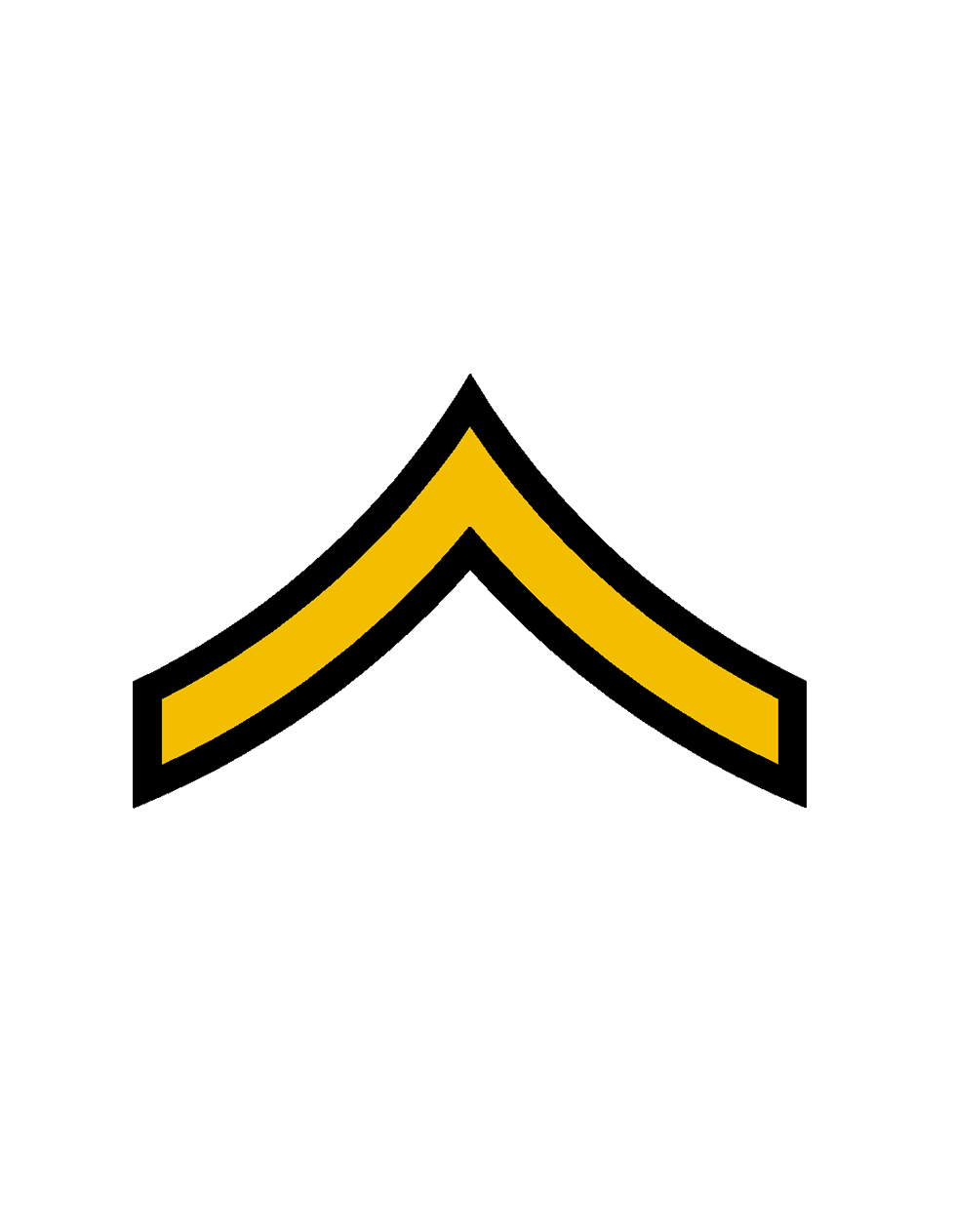
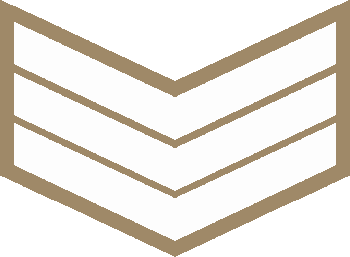
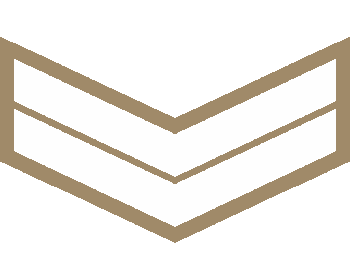
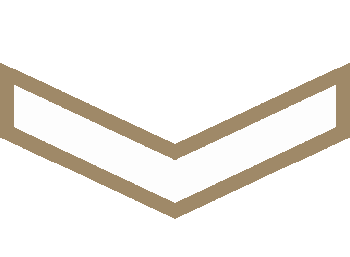
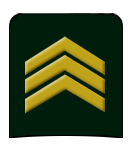
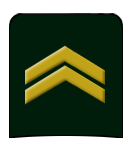
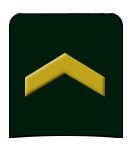
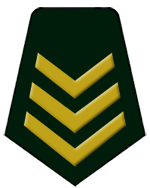
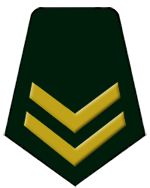
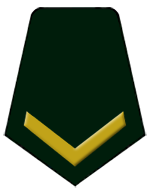
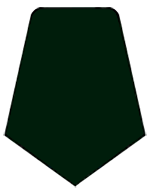
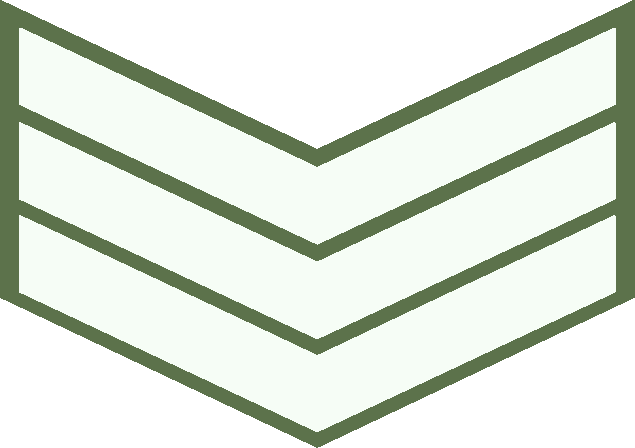
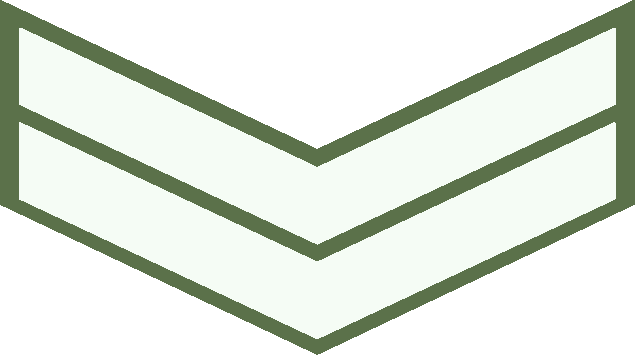
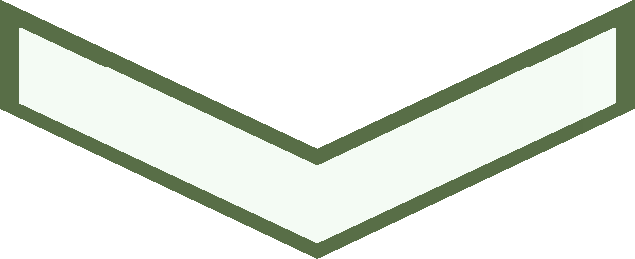
Rank group	Senior NCOs										Junior NCOs				Enlisted
Antigua and Barbuda Regiment															No insignia
Antigua and Barbuda Regiment	Warrant officer class 1			Warrant officer class 2		Staff sergeant	Sergeant				Corporal		Lance corporal		Private (or equivalent)
Argentine Army
Argentine Army	Suboficial mayor			Suboficial principal		Sargento ayudante	Sargento primero		Sargento		Cabo primero		Cabo		Voluntario primero		Voluntario segundo	Soldado de segunda en comisión
(The Bahamas) Bahamas	No army
Barbados Regiment															No insignia
Barbados Regiment	Warrant officer class 1			Warrant officer class 2		Staff sergeant	Sergeant				Corporal		Lance corporal		Private (or equivalent)
Belize Defence Force															No insignia
Belize Defence Force	Warrant officer class 1			Warrant officer class 2		Staff sergeant	Sergeant				Corporal		Lance corporal		Private (or equivalent)
Bolivian Army
Bolivian Army	Sub-oficial maestre		Sub-oficial mayor	Sub-oficial 1°		Sub-oficial 2°	Sub-oficial inicial		Sargento 1°		Sargento 2°		Sargento inicial°		Cabo	Dragoneante	Soldado raso
Brazilian Army
Brazilian Army	Subtenente						Primeiro-sargento		Segundo-sargento	Terceiro-sargento	Taifeiro-mor	Cabo			Taifeiro primeira classe		Taifeiro segunda classe	Soldado
Canadian Army																	No insignia
Canadian Army	Chief warrant officer			Master warrant officer		Warrant officer	Sergeant				Master corporal		Corporal		Private (trained)		Private (basic)
Canadian Army	Adjudant(e)-chef			Adjudant(e)-maître		Adjudant(e)	Sergent(e)				Caporal(e)-chef		Caporal(e)		Soldat(e) (formé(e))		Soldat(e) (confirmé(e))
Chilean Army
Chilean Army	Suboficial mayor			Suboficial		Sargento primero			Sargento segundo		Cabo primero		Cabo segundo	Cabo			Soldado de tropa profesional
Colombian National Army																		No insignia
Colombian National Army	Sargento mayor de comando conjunto	Sargento mayor de ejército	Sargento mayor de comando	Sargento mayor		Sargento primero	Sargento viceprimero		Sargento segundo		Cabo primero		Cabo segundo		Cabo tercero		Soldado profesional	Soldado
Rank group	Senior NCOs										Junior NCOs				Enlisted
Costa Rica	No army
Cuban Revolutionary Army																	No insignia
Cuban Revolutionary Army	Mayor suboficial	Primer suboficial	Segundo suboficial	Suboficial		Sargento de primera	Sargento de segunda		Sargento de tercera				Cabo				Soldado
Dominica	No army
Dominican Army															No insignia
Dominican Army	Sub-teniente tercero	Sub-teniente segundo	Sub-teniente primero	Sargento mayor		Sargento de administracion	Sargento						Cabo		Raso
Ecuadorian Army
Ecuadorian Army	Sub-oficial mayor		Sub-oficial primero	Sub-oficial segundo		Sargento primero			Sargento segundo		Cabo primero		Cabo segundo				Soldado
Salvadoran Army																	No insignia
Salvadoran Army	Sargento mayor de división	Sargento mayor de brigada	Sargento mayor primero	Sargento mayor		Sargento primero	Sargento		Subsargento				Cabo		Dragoneante		Soldado
Grenada	No army
Guatemalan Army																	No insignia
Guatemalan Army	Sargento mayor			Sargento técnico		Sargento primero			Sargento segundo				Cabo		Soldado de primera		Soldado
Guyana Army															No insignia
Guyana Army	Warrant officer class 1			Warrant officer class 2		Staff sergeant	Sergeant				Corporal		Lance corporal		Private (or equivalent)
Haitian Army
Haitian Army				Sergent major		Premier sergent	Sergent-fourrier		Sergent				Caporal		Soldat de première classe		Soldat
Haitian Army				Sèjan majò		Premye sèjan	Sèjan-fourye		Sèjan				Kaporal		Sòlda premye klas		Sòlda
Honduran Army
Honduran Army				Sargento mayor		Sargento primero	Sargento segundo		Sargento raso				Cabo				Soldado
Jamaican Army															No insignia
Jamaican Army	Warrant officer class 1			Warrant officer class 2		Staff sergeant	Sergeant				Corporal		Lance corporal		Private (or equivalent)
Mexican Army
Mexican Army						Sargento primero			Sargento segundo				Cabo				Soldado
Rank group	Senior NCOs										Junior NCOs				Enlisted
Nicaraguan Army																	No insignia
Nicaraguan Army	Suboficial primero		Suboficial segundo	Suboficial		Sargento primero	Sargento segundo		Sargento tercero						Soldado de primera		Soldado
Panama	No army
Paraguayan Army
Paraguayan Army	Sub-oficial principal		Sub-oficial mayor	Sub-oficial	Sargento ayudante	Sargento primero	Vice sargento primero		Sargento segundo		Cabo primero		Cabo segundo				Soldado
Peruvian Army
Peruvian Army	Suboficial primero		Suboficial segundo	Suboficial tercero		Sargento primero	Sargento segundo						Cabo				Soldado
SKN Regiment															No insignia
SKN Regiment	Warrant officer 1			Warrant officer 2		Staff sergeant	Sergeant				Corporal		Lance corporal		Private
Saint Lucia	No army
Saint Vincent and the Grenadines	No army
Suriname Army
Suriname Army	Adjudant					Sergeant-majoor	Sergeant der 1e klasse		Sergeant		Korporaal der 1e klasse		Korporaal		Soldaat der 1e klasse		Soldaat
Trinidad and Tobago Regiment															No insignia
Trinidad and Tobago Regiment	Warrant officer class 1			Warrant officer class 2		Staff sergeant	Sergeant				Corporal		Lance corporal		Private
United States Army																	No insignia
United States Army	Command sergeant major		Sergeant major	First sergeant	Master sergeant	Sergeant first class	Staff sergeant		Sergeant		Corporal	Specialist	Private first class		Private		Private
National Army of Uruguay																	No insignia
National Army of Uruguay	Suboficial mayor					Sargento de primera	Sargento				Cabo de primera		Cabo de segunda				Soldado de primera	Aprendiz
Venezuelan Army																	No insignia
Venezuelan Army	Sargento supervisor		Sargento ayudante	Sargento mayor de primera		Sargento mayor de segunda	Sargento mayor de tercera	Sargento primero	Sargento segundo		Cabo primero		Cabo segundo		Distinguido		Soldado raso
Rank group	Senior NCOs										Junior NCOs				Enlisted

== See also ==
- Comparative army officer ranks of the Americas
- Ranks and insignia of NATO armies enlisted
