= Fire captain =

Rank in various fire services

Captain is a rank in various fire services.

== Description ==
A fire captain is typically in charge of a fire company, a group of firefighters who are assigned to the same fire apparatus. The fire captain is responsible for the welfare and performance of the company's personnel and the maintenance of the apparatus. In a single-apparatus fire station, the fire captain is also the overall manager of the station. Fire departments typically arrange the shifts so that a captain can be present at most emergencies. Besides those who work at fire stations, fire captains are employed in other roles such as managing training.

=== North America ===
In most American and Canadian fire services, a captain ranks above a lieutenant and below a battalion chief, and therefore two grades above a regular firefighter. This varies, though, between departments – In the Los Angeles County Fire Department, for example, engineer is the next lowest rank below captain.

=== United Kingdom ===
The rank of fire captain does not always have a direct equivalent in the United Kingdom and Commonwealth countries outside of Canada. These fire services are more often organized around a "watch". Whereas a company is a group of firefighters who work different shifts on the same apparatus, a watch is a group of firefighters who work the same shift on more than one apparatus. Like a captain in American and Canadian fire departments, the watch manager is two grades above a regular firefighter.

=== New Zealand ===
In the New Zealand Fire Service in the early 1980s, a fire captain was in charge of a station. The NZFS has now moved to senior station officer and station officer as station management ranks. The person in charge of a fire brigade is the chief fire officer, and captain is no longer used.
