= Sub-officer =

Military rank below commissioned officer

Sub-officer, or the equivalent in other languages, is a term used in many armed forces used to indicate ranks below commissioned officers. Sub-officer is equivalent to the term warrant officer in the British Commonwealth and the United States. Historically armed forces using the term sub-officer have used it to refer to more senior non-commissioned ranks, typically from sergeant upwards, but the term often covers all ranks that other forces designate non-commissioned. In navies the term is comparable to petty officer.

There is a specific rank of "sub-officer" in some armed forces, in the UK Fire and Rescue Services, and in the Irish Fire Services.

== Military rank ==
=== Argentina ===
In Argentina the term sub-officer (suboficial) formerly applied only to the more senior non-commissioned ranks. Now these ranks are known as "superior sub-officers" and lower ranks as "junior sub-officers". Each branch of the Argentine Armed Forces use chief sub-officer (suboficial principal) and senior sub-officer (suboficial mayor) as the second highest and highest non-commissioned ranks respectively. The Navy and Air Force also use other "superior sub-officer" ranks.

Argentine superior sub-officer ranks:

Argentine Army rank	Argentine Navy rank	Argentine Air Force rank
-------------	-------------	-------------
Senior sub-officer - Suboficial Mayor	Senior sub-officer - Suboficial Mayor	Senior sub-officer - Suboficial Mayor
Chief sub-officer - Suboficial Principal	Chief sub-officer - Suboficial Principal	Chief sub-officer - Suboficial Principal
Adjutant sergeant - Sargento Ayudante	Sub-officer first class - Suboficial Primero	Adjutant sub-officer - Suboficial Ayudante
Sergeant first class - Sargento Primero	Sub-officer second class - Suboficial Segundo	Auxiliary sub-officer - Suboficial Auxiliar

=== Brazil ===
In Brazil, the Sub-officer (Suboficial) is the highest enlisted rank for the Brazilian Navy (including the Brazilian Marine Corps) and Brazilian Air Force and the equivalent of the Sub-lieutenant (Subtenente) in the Brazilian Army.

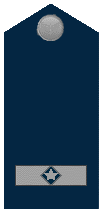
Suboficial (Brazilian Air Force)

Suboficial (Brazilian Navy)

=== Chile ===
In all three services of the Chilean Armed Forces, in the Carabineros de Chile and in the Chilean Gendarmerie, only two sub-officer ranks are used:

- Suboficial (sub-officer)
- Suboficial Mayor (senior sub-officer)

These sub-officer ranks are the same in all the military and police services.

=== France ===
In France a sub-officer is sergeant (or equivalent) and above as well as the rank of student sub-officer. (The equivalents to sergeant are 2nd master in the French Navy, and Maréchal-des-logis in some army units (often abbreviated to "margi"), mostly cavalry and logistics arms, and most gendarmerie units.) Lower non-commissioned ranks, such as corporal and brigadier, are not considered sub-officers. Traditionally, French sub-officers are often recruited directly as sub-officers rather than rising from more junior ranks.

France Army rank	France Navy rank	France Air Force rank
-------------	-------------	-------------
Major	Major	Major
Adjudant-chef	Maître principal	Adjudant-chef
Adjudant	Premier maître	Adjudant
Sergent-chef / maréchal des logis-chef	Maître	Sergent-chef
Sergent / maréchal des logis	Second-maître	Sergent

== Fire service rank ==
=== Ireland ===
Sub-station officer (usually addressed as "Sub" or "Subbo") is a rank in the Irish Fire Services, below the rank of station officer.

A Sub-station officer usually performs a command function in support of the station officer's role on the fireground, and occasionally may take command role at less-serious incidents and takes command when the station officer is absent.

The badge of rank is two white or silver bars on the epaulettes (or the collar of the firefighting uniform), the helmet is yellow with two black 12.5 mm bands on it.

=== United Kingdom ===
Sub-officer (usually addressed as "Sub") is a rank in the London Fire Brigade and Gibraltar Fire and Rescue Service. It was formerly all the British fire services, between leading firefighter and station officer.

A sub-officer was usually in charge of a small one-pump fire station or a watch in a larger station. In some brigades they may be in charge of multi-pump stations.

The badge of rank is two white or silver bars on the epaulettes (or the collar of the firefighting uniform), the helmet was yellow with two 12.5 mm bands on it.

With the transition from a rank based structure to a role based structure, the rank of sub-officer has disappeared and is now replaced by the role of watch manager A. The role of crew commander / crew manager now wear the markings of two silver bars.

In 2019 The London Fire Brigade changed back to the rank system which resulted in watch commander A being reverted to sub-officer (with watch commander B being reverted to station officer).

The female equivalent in the days when women in the fire services performed administrative and control room roles only was senior leading firewoman. With the advent of mixed-sex control rooms, the title was changed to senior fire control operator (SFCOp).

== See also ==
- Junior commissioned officer
