= Comparative army enlisted ranks of the Commonwealth =

Rank comparison chart of armies/land forces of Commonwealth of Nations states.

== Enlisted ==
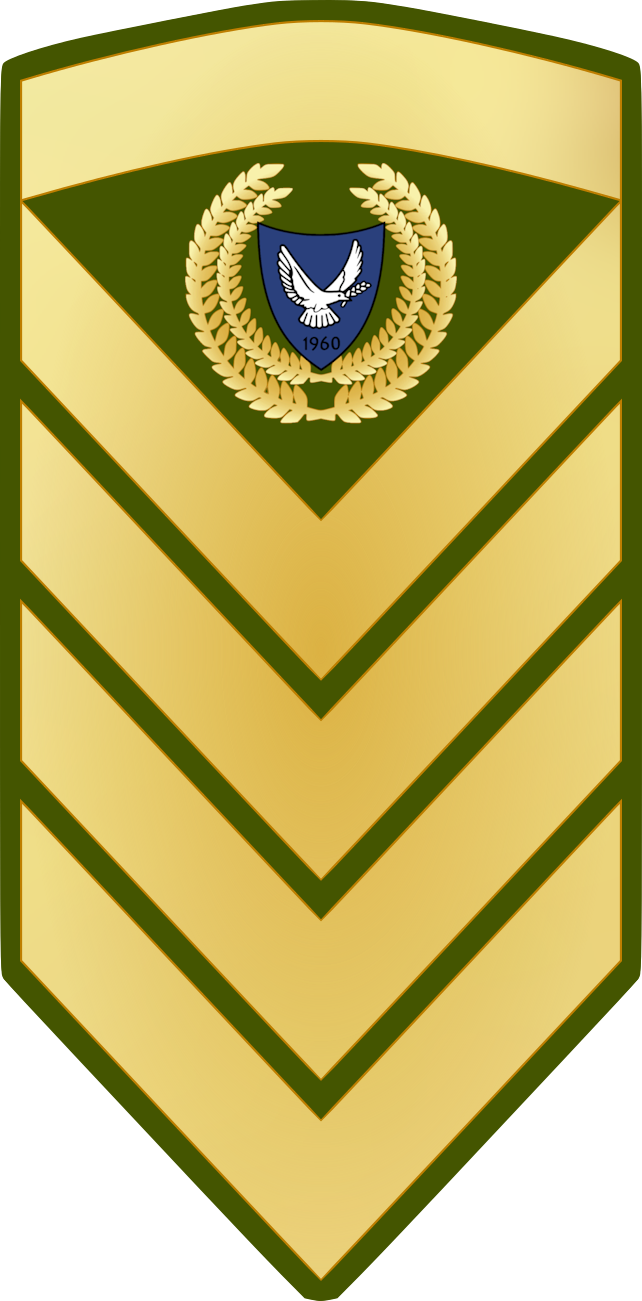
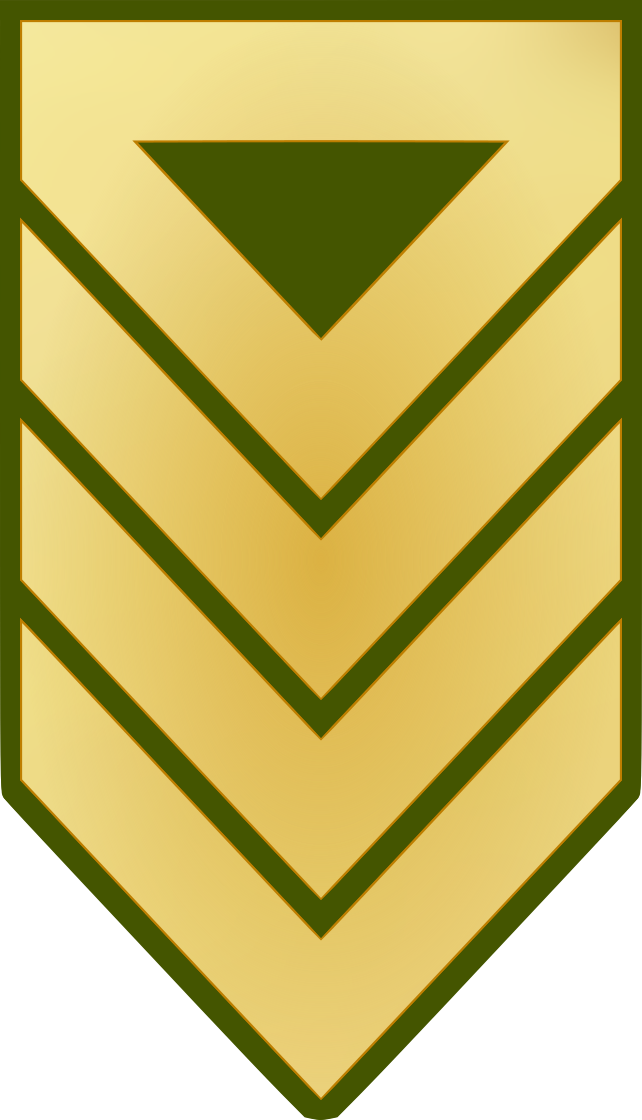
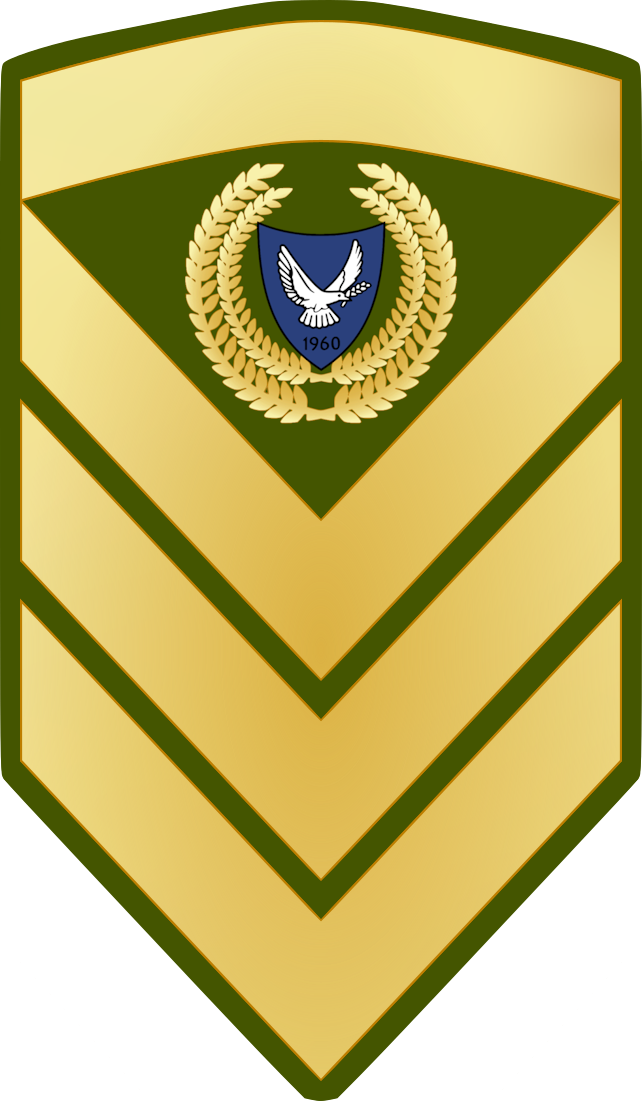
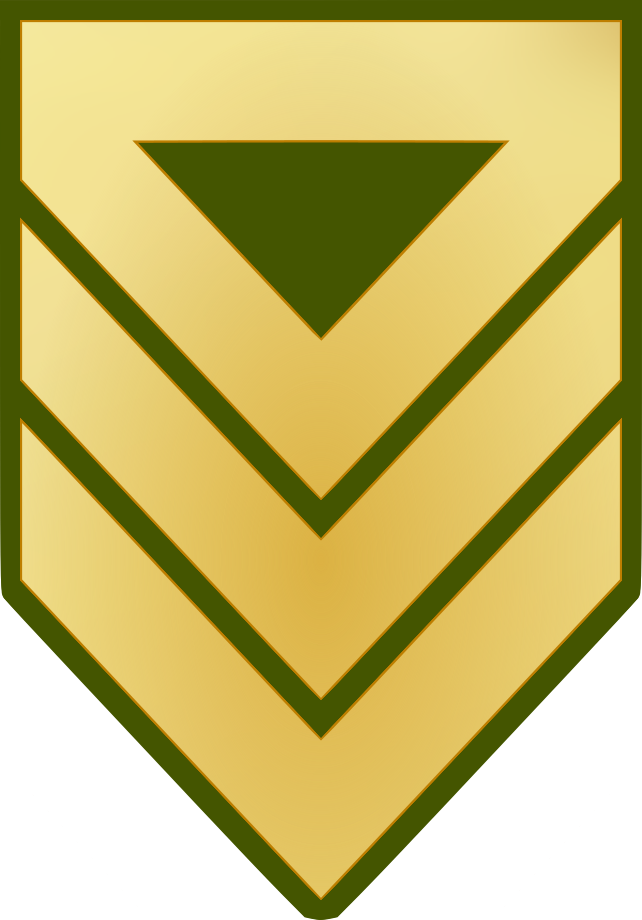
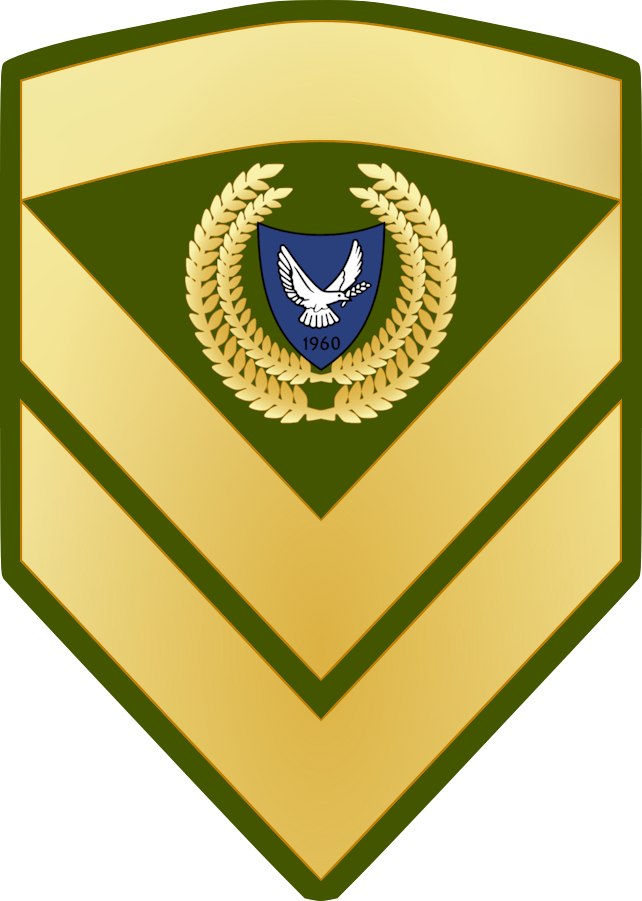
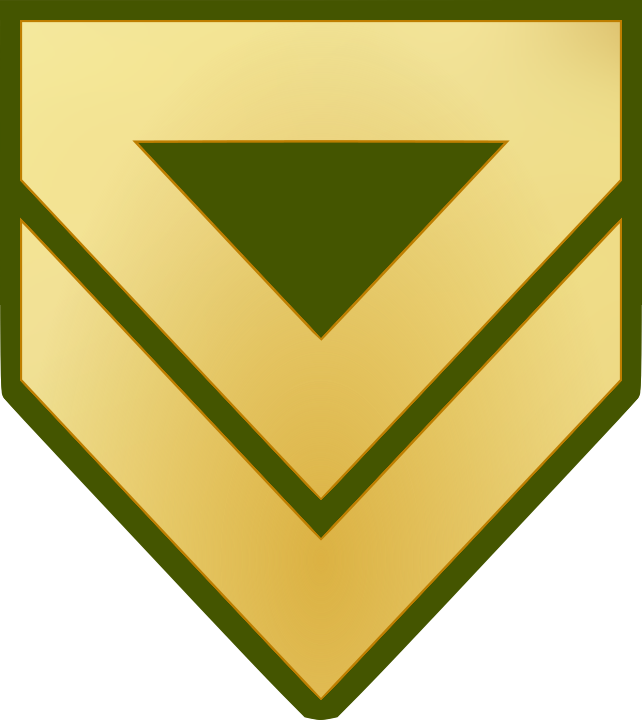
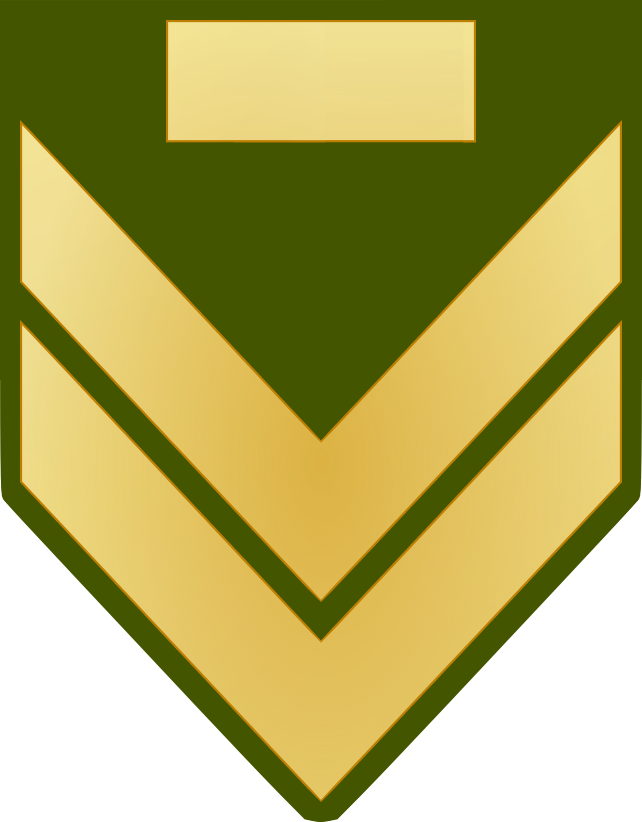
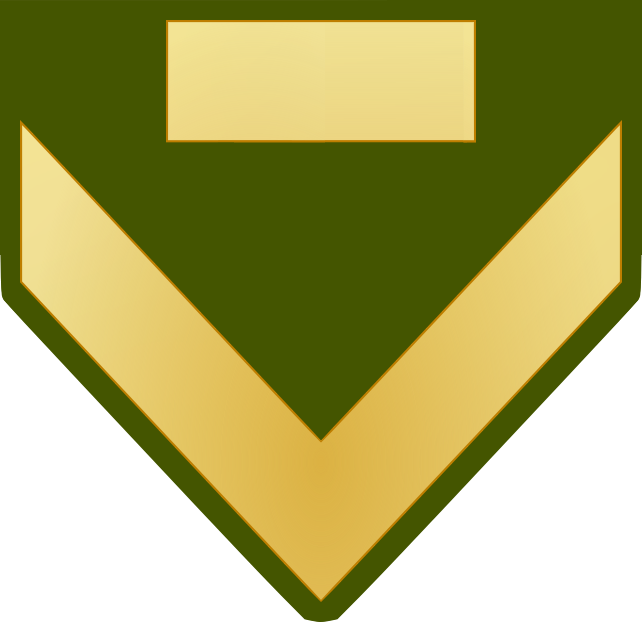
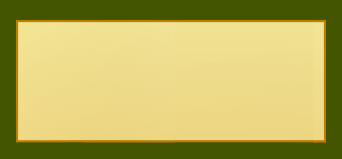
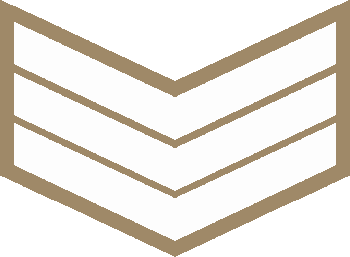
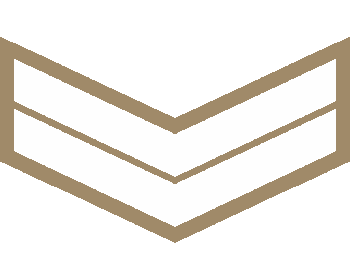
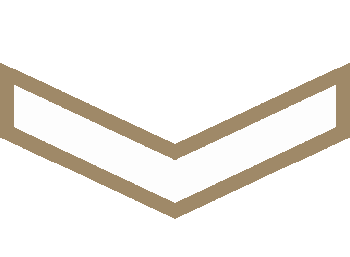
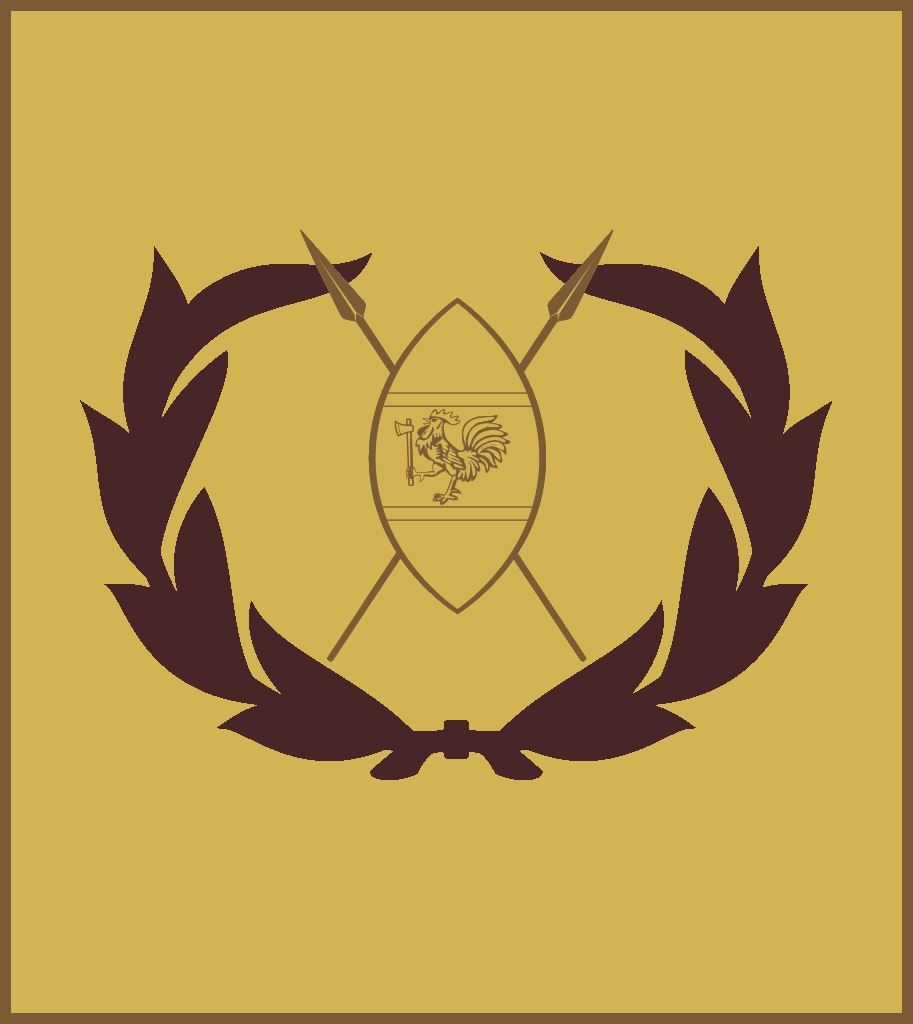
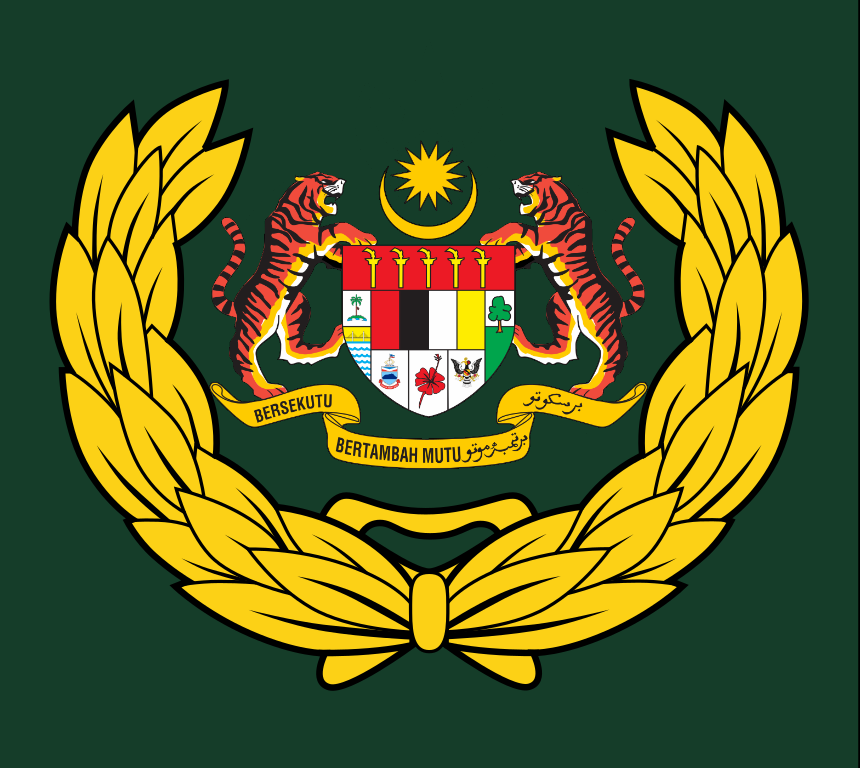
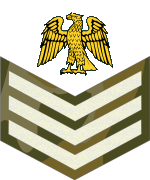
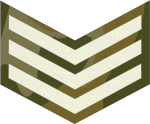
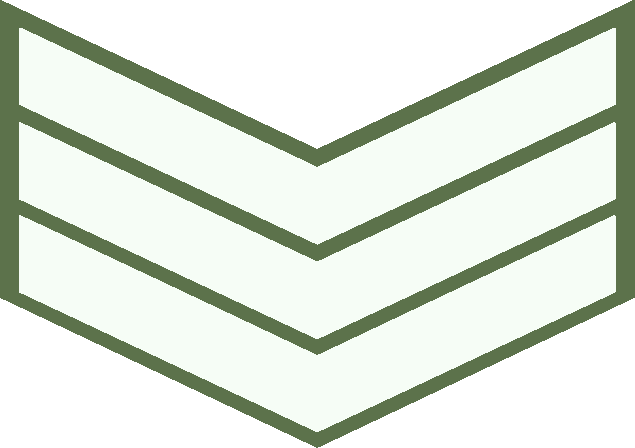
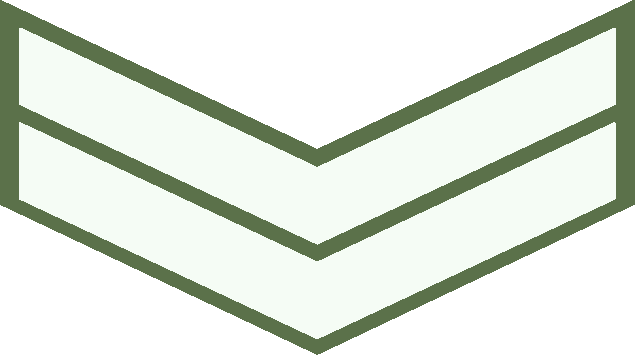
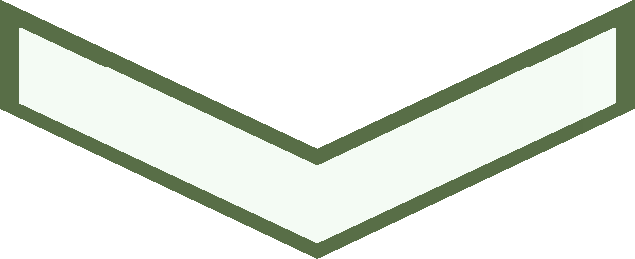
Rank group	Senior NCOs						Junior NCOs			Enlisted
Antigua and Barbuda Regiment										No insignia
Antigua and Barbuda Regiment	Warrant officer class 1		Warrant officer class 2	Staff sergeant	Sergeant		Corporal		Lance corporal	Private (or equivalent)
Australian Army										No insignia
Australian Army	Regimental sergeant major of the army	Warrant officer class 1	Warrant officer class 2		Sergeant		Corporal		Lance corporal	Private (or equivalent)
(The Bahamas) Bahamas	No army
Bangladesh Army
Bangladesh Army	মাস্টার ওয়ারেন্ট অফিসার; Māsṭār ōẏārēnṭ ôphisār		সিনিয়র ওয়ারেন্ট অফিসার; Siniẏar ōẏārēnṭ ôphisār	ওয়ারেন্ট অফিসার; Ōẏārēnṭ ôphisār	সার্জেন্ট; Sārjēnṭ		কর্পোর‍্যাল kôrpōrāl		ল্যান্স কর্পোর‍্যাল; Lāns kôrpōrāl		সৈনিক; Śoinik
Barbados Regiment										No insignia
Barbados Regiment	Warrant officer class 1		Warrant officer class 2	Staff sergeant	Sergeant		Corporal		Lance corporal	Private (or equivalent)
Belize Defence Force										No insignia
Belize Defence Force	Warrant officer class 1		Warrant officer class 2	Staff sergeant	Sergeant		Corporal		Lance corporal	Private (or equivalent)
Botswana Ground Force										No insignia
Botswana Ground Force	Warrant officer class 1		Warrant officer class 2	Staff sergeant	Sergeant		Corporal		Lance corporal	Private (or equivalent)
Royal Brunei Land Force										No insignia
Royal Brunei Land Force	Pegawai waran 1		Pegawai waran 2	Staf sarjan	Sarjan		Koperal		Lans koperal	Prebet/Soldadu
Cameroon Ground Forces
Cameroon Ground Forces	Adjudant-chef		Adjudant		Sergent-chef	Sergent	Caporal-chef		Caporal	Soldat première	Soldat
Canadian Army
Canadian Army	Chief warrant officer		Master warrant officer	Warrant officer	Sergeant		Master corporal		Corporal	Private (trained)	Private (basic)
Canadian Army	Adjudant(e)-chef		Adjudant(e)-maître	Adjudant(e)	Sergent(e)		Caporal(e)-chef		Caporal(e)	Soldat(e) (formé(e))	Soldat(e) (confirmé(e))
Cypriot Ground Forces											Arm/corps insignia only
Cypriot Ground Forces	Ανθυπασπιστής; Anthypaspistís		Αρχιλοχίας; Archilochías	Επιλοχίας; Epilochías	Λοχίας; Lochías		Δεκανέας; Dekanéas		Υποδεκανέας; Ypodekanéas		Στρατιώτης; Stratiótis
Dominica	No army
Falkland Islands Defence Force										No insignia
Falkland Islands Defence Force			Warrant officer class 2 (Permanent staff instructor)	Colour sergeant	Sergeant		Corporal		Lance corporal	Private
Fiji Infantry Regiment										No insignia
Fiji Infantry Regiment	Warrant officer class 1		Warrant officer class 2	Staff sergeant	Sergeant		Corporal		Lance corporal	Private (or equivalent)
Gabonese Army
Gabonese Army	Adjudant-chef major	Adjudant-chef	Adjudant		Sergent-chef	Sergent	Caporal-chef		Caporal	Soldat première	Soldat
Ghana Army										No insignia
Ghana Army	Warrant officer class 1		Warrant officer class 2	Staff sergeant	Sergeant		Corporal		Lance corporal	Private (or equivalent)
Grenada	No army
Guyana Army										No insignia
Guyana Army	Warrant officer class 1		Warrant officer class 2	Staff sergeant	Sergeant		Corporal		Lance corporal	Private (or equivalent)
Indian Army										No insignia
Indian Army	Subedar-major सूबेदार मेजर		Subedar सूबेदार	Naib subedar नायब सूबेदार	Havildar हवलदार		Naik नायक		Lance naik लांस नायक	Sepoy सिपाही
Rank group	Senior NCOs						Junior NCOs			Enlisted
Jamaican Army										No insignia
Jamaican Army	Warrant officer class 1		Warrant officer class 2	Staff sergeant	Sergeant		Corporal		Lance corporal	Private (or equivalent)
Kenya Army										No insignia
Kenya Army	Warrant officer class 1		Warrant officer class 2	Senior sergeant	Sergeant		Corporal		Lance corporal	Private (or equivalent)
Kiribati	No army
Lesotho Army										No insignia
Lesotho Army	Warrant officer class 1		Warrant officer class 2	Staff sergeant	Sergeant		Corporal		Lance corporal	Private (or equivalent)
Malawi Army										No insignia
Malawi Army	Warrant Officer Class 1		Warrant Officer Class 2	Staff Sergeant	Sergeant		Corporal		Lance Corporal	Private (or equivalent)
Malaysian Army											No insignia
Malaysian Army	Pegawai waran I		Pegawai waran II	Staf sarjan	Sarjan		Koperal		Lans koperal		Prebet	Rekrut
Army of Malta										No insignia
Army of Malta	Warrant Officer Class 1 Uffiċjal tal-warrant tal-klassi 1		Warrant Officer Class 2 Uffiċjal tal-warrant tal-klassi 2	Staff Sergeant; Surġent tal-istaff	Sergeant; Surġent		Bombardier; Bumbardier		Lance Bombardier; Bumbardier tal-lanċa	Gunner; Artiller
Mauritius	No army
Mozambican Army
Mozambican Army				Intendente	Primeiro-sargento	Segundo-sargento	Terceiro-sargento		Cabo	Primeiro soldado
Namibian Army										No insignia
Namibian Army	Warrant officer class 1		Warrant officer class 2	Staff sergeant	Sergeant		Corporal		Lance corporal	Private (or equivalent)
Nauru	No army
New Zealand Army											No insignia
New Zealand Army	Warrant officer class 1		Warrant officer class 2	Staff sergeant	Sergeant		Corporal		Lance corporal		Private (or equivalent)
Nigerian Army										No insignia
Nigerian Army	Army warrant officer	Master warrant officer	Warrant officer	Staff sergeant	Sergeant		Corporal		Lance corporal	Private (or equivalent)
Pakistan Army										No insignia
Pakistan Army	Subedar-major صوبیدار میجر		Subedar صوبیدار	Naib subedar نائب صوبیدار	Havildar حوالدار		Naik نائیک		Lance naik لانس نائیک	Sepoy سپاہی
Papua New Guinea Land Element										No insignia
Papua New Guinea Land Element	Warrant officer class 1 ?		Warrant officer class 2 ?	Staff sergeant Plag Sajen	Sergeant; Sajen		Corporal; Kopul		Lance corporal Lans Kopul	Private; Praivet
Rwandan Land Forces											No insignia
Rwandan Land Forces	Warrant officer I		Warrant officer II	Sergeant major	Staff sergeant	Sergeant			Corporal		Private
SKN Regiment										No insignia
SKN Regiment	Warrant officer 1		Warrant officer 2	Staff sergeant	Sergeant		Corporal		Lance corporal	Private
Rank group	Senior NCOs						Junior NCOs			Enlisted
Saint Lucia	No army
Saint Vincent and the Grenadines	No army
Samoa	No army
Seychelles Infantry Unit										No insignia
Seychelles Infantry Unit	Warrant officer class 1		Warrant officer class 2	Staff sergeant	Sergeant		Corporal		Lance corporal	Private (or equivalent)
Sierra Leone Army										No insignia
Sierra Leone Army	Warrant officer class 1		Warrant officer class 2	Staff sergeant	Sergeant		Corporal		Lance corporal	Private (or equivalent)
Singapore Army											No insignia	No insignia
Singapore Army	Master sergeant		Staff sergeant	First sergeant	Second sergeant	Third sergeant	Corporal first class	Corporal	Lance corporal	Private first class	Private	Recruit
Solomon Islands	No army
South African Army										No insignia
South African Army	Warrant officer class 1		Warrant officer class 2	Staff sergeant	Sergeant		Corporal		Lance corporal	Private (or equivalent)
Sri Lanka Army										No insignia
Sri Lanka Army	Warrant officer class I		Warrant officer class II	Staff sergeant (Note: For artillery personnel at this rank, the emblem is replaced by towed artillery gun. For engineering personnel at this rank, the emblem is replaced by a bursting grenade.)	Sergeant		Corporal/ Bombardier		Lance corporal/ Lance bombardier	Private (or equivalent)
Eswatini Army										No insignia
Eswatini Army	Warrant Officer Class 1		Warrant Officer Class 2	Staff Sergeant	Sergeant		Corporal		Lance Corporal	Private (or equivalent)
Tanzanian Army										No insignia
Tanzanian Army	Afisa mteule daraja la kwanza		Afisa mteule daraja la pili	Sajinitaji	Sajenti		Koplo		Koplo usu	Mtu ndege
Togolese Army											No insignia
Togolese Army	Major	Adjudant-chef	Adjudant		Sergent-chef	Sergent	Caporal-chef		Caporal	Soldat de 1^{ère} classe	Soldat de 2^{ème} classe
Tongan Land Component										No insignia
Tongan Land Component	Warrant officer class 1		Warrant officer class 2	Staff sergeant	Sergeant		Corporal		Lance corporal	Private (or equivalent)
Tongan Land Component	'Ofisa Fakamafai Kalasi 1		'Ofisa Fakamafai Kalasi 2	Sitafu satini	Satini		Kopila		Lani kopila	Palaiveti
Trinidad and Tobago Regiment										No insignia
Trinidad and Tobago Regiment	Warrant officer class 1		Warrant officer class 2	Staff sergeant	Sergeant		Corporal		Lance corporal	Private
Tuvalu	No army
Ugandan Land Forces										No insignia
Ugandan Land Forces	Warrant officer class 1		Warrant officer class 2	Staff sergeant	Sergeant		Corporal		Lance corporal	Private (or equivalent)
British Army										No insignia
British Army	Warrant officer class 1		Warrant officer class 2	Staff/Colour sergeant	Sergeant		Corporal		Lance corporal	Private (or equivalent)
Vanuatu Mobile Forces
Vanuatu Mobile Forces	Warrant Officer; Class 1		Warrant Officer; Class 2	Staff Sergeant; Staf Sajen	Sergeant; Sajen		Corporal; Kofol		Lance Corporal	Constable; Polis	Recruit; Rikrut
Zambian Army										No insignia
Zambian Army	Warrant officer class 1		Warrant officer class 2	Staff sergeant	Sergeant		Corporal		Lance corporal	Private (or equivalent)
Rank group	Senior NCOs						Junior NCOs			Enlisted

== See also ==
- Comparative army enlisted ranks of the Americas
- Ranks and insignia of NATO armies enlisted
