= Senior station officer =

Fire service rank

Senior station officer (SSO) is a rank in the Hong Kong Fire Services Department, and in some fire services in Australia and New Zealand. It is typically the next rank above a station officer.

== Australia ==
The highest pay classification in the fire service industrial award is "senior station officer". However, not all services use SSO as an operational rank.

=== Victoria ===
At most Fire Rescue Victoria (FRV) stations with multiple appliances, an SSO is assigned as the officer-in-charge of the "A" pumper on each shift. SSOs wear a silver helmet, and their insignia is two impellers.

The rank was inherited from the former Metropolitan Fire Brigade, and from former paid staff ranks at the Country Fire Authority.

== New Zealand ==
In career fire stations, an SSO is the officer in charge of a single watch at a station with multiple appliances. They ride as an officer on one appliance, with the other appliances being commanded by station officers.

In a volunteer brigade there is usually only one SSO, and some volunteer brigades have no SSO positions at all. Here the SSO acts as the senior operational officer, to allow the chief fire officer and their deputy to focus on the running of the brigade.

In both career and volunteer situations, an SSO reports to a CFO.

In New Zealand, the senior station officer rank insignia is two impellers. SSOs wear red helmets with two blue stripes (prior to November 2013, they wore yellow helmets with two blue stripes).
