= Station officer =

Fire fighter's rank

Station officer is a supervisory rank in a number of Commonwealth and other fire services, including those in Australia, the United Kingdom, Ireland, and the New Zealand Fire Service.

== Australia and New Zealand ==
In Australia and New Zealand a station officer is a career / permanent officer who is either the single officer on a watch / platoon / shift system in a single- or dual-fire apparatus/appliance station, with three to five firefighters reporting to them, or one of several officers under a senior station officer at a station with multiple appliances.

In New Zealand the rank badge is a single impeller; in Australia, the rank badge is two impellers. Station officers in New Zealand wear red helmets with one blue stripe (prior to November 2013, they were yellow with one blue stripe).

In Queensland Fire and Emergency Service (QFES) (fire and rescue division) there are three station officer (SO) ranks: station officer 1 (SO 1), station officer 2(SO 2) and station officer 3(SO 3) and these ranks reflect the older station officer ranks of sub-station officer, station officer and senior station officer. Each of these ranks has various pay points within them. QFES SOs wear a yellow helmet with a single red stripe for SO 1 and a double red stripe for SO 2s and 3s.

In the Country Fire Authority (CFA) and Metropolitan Fire and Emergency Services Brigade (MFB) Melbourne, Australia, a station officer has one impeller, and a senior station officer has two impellers.

Although variations still occur at the SO level within the different state fire and rescue services due to competency, experience and qualification requirements, the Australasian Fire and Emergency Services Authorities Council (AFAC) has ensured that at the senior SO level the requirements across Australasia are generally consistent throughout all jurisdictions.

Generally, Australasian SOs are made competent to perform the job requirements of the next higher rank within the respective state systems e.g; leading firefighters (L/Ffs) can perform the role of SO 1s and SO 1s can perform the role of SO 2s and SO 3s can perform the role of inspectors, if required.

In some states systems, senior SOs can also in rural and semi-rural environments play a mentoring role across and for a diverse range of career/permanent, auxiliary/retained and volunteer firefighting personnel.

== United Kingdom ==
In the United Kingdom, an SO commands a watch at a multi-appliance station. The officer may have command of a watch at a very large station. The rank badge is two impellers; they also wear a white helmet with a half-inch black band around it.

From 2006 most UK fire and rescue services changed from a rank-based system to a role-based system. This change meant the traditional rank titles were replaced with role-based titles for the duty performed. Station officers (two impeller rank marking) became watch managers. A station commander (three impellers) is a more senior officer with a similar role, usually in charge of one or more fire stations.

In 2019, the London Fire Brigade, the UK's second largest fire and rescue service, announced that it would be reverting to the more traditional rank structure once again. The two impeller insignia therefore once again indicates the rank of SO, as a rank senior to a sub-officer, and junior to a station commander.

== Ireland ==
The fire services in Ireland also use the rank of SO. In the full-time brigades of the five cities, they fulfil the role of watch manager, whereas in the retained county brigades, they fulfil the role of station commander. Rank markings are two impellers and, on the foreground, a white helmet with black comb and one black stripe.

== United States ==
In the United States, "station officer" is often a general term and has several meanings. It usually refers to the senior officer at the station, often a captain or a lieutenant. A station commander is an officer in charge of one or more fire stations, often referred to as a district chief or battalion chief in North America. If a battalion chief or district chief works out of a fire station, a captain or lieutenant is still usually the officer in charge of the day-to-day operations of the station. In some cases the term "station officer" is used to differentiate between an officer who works in the field and a staff officer.

In many areas there is a captain on every shift (watch) at a station. This means that each shift has its own SO. In some departments there is a designated officer who is in overall charge of the station.
