= Military ranks of Portugal =

The military ranks of Portugal form the system of hierarchical relationships in the Portuguese Armed Forces.

There are two basic systems of ranks. The first one is used in the Portuguese Army (Exército) and in the Portuguese Air Force (Força Aérea), consisting of traditional land military ranks. This system is also used in the National Republican Guard (GNR, Guarda Nacional Republicana), a gendarmerie force that can be put under the command of the Armed Forces in case of war. The second system is used by the Portuguese Navy (Marinha), consisting of traditional naval ranks.

In the Armed Forces of Portugal, the hierarchy of ranks divides them in three large categories: Officers (oficiais), Sergeants (sargentos) and Enlisted (praças). The officers category is, in turn, subdivided into three subcategories: General officers (oficiais generais), Senior officers (oficiais superiores) and Junior officers (oficiais subalternos).

The insignia of rank used in all branches of the Armed Forces is generally similar, despite some particular details existing in each branch.

== Commanders ==
Rank group	Head of state	Chief of the General Staff
Portuguese Army
Portuguese Navy
Portuguese Air Force

== Commissioned officer ranks ==
The rank insignia of commissioned officers.

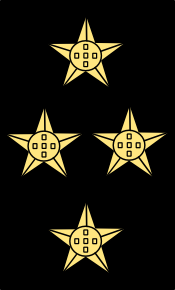
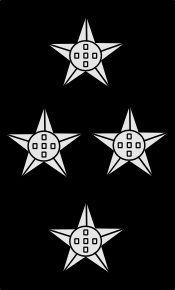
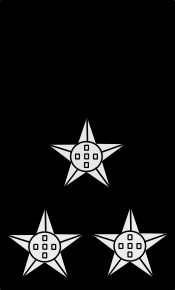
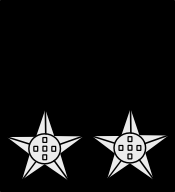
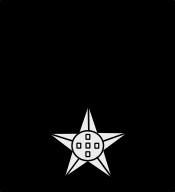
NATO code	OF-10	OF-9	OF-8		OF-7	OF-6	OF-5		OF-4	OF-3	OF-2	OF-1
Portuguese Army
Portuguese Army	Marechal do Exército	General	Tenente-general		Major-general	Brigadeiro-general	Coronel-tirocinado (Note: Colonel who has completed the General Officer training course. Between 1929 and 1937, the Coronel-tirocinado was called Brigadeiro.)	Coronel	Tenente-coronel	Major	Capitão	Tenente	Alferes
Portuguese Navy
Portuguese Navy	Almirante da Armada	Almirante	Vice-almirante		Contra-almirante	Comodoro	Capitão de mar e guerra		Capitão de fragata	Capitão-tenente	Primeiro-tenente	Segundo-tenente	Guarda-marinha/ Subtenente
Portuguese Air Force
Portuguese Air Force	Marechal da Força Aérea	General	Tenente-general		Major-general	Brigadeiro-general	Coronel		Tenente-coronel	Major	Capitão	Tenente	Alferes
National Republican Guard
National Republican Guard			Tenente-general; Comandante-general	Tenente-general	Major-general		Coronel		Tenente-coronel	Major	Capitão	Tenente	Alferes
NATO code	OF-10	OF-9	OF-8		OF-7	OF-6	OF-5		OF-4	OF-3	OF-2	OF-1

== Student officer ranks ==
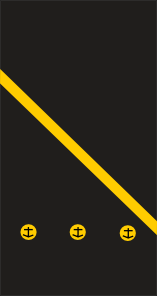
Rank group	Student officer
Portuguese Army	(Note: worn on the left sleeve, 15 cm from the shoulder.)
Portuguese Army	Tenente aluno	Alferes aluno	Aspirante aluno	Cadete aluno do 4° ano	Cadete aluno do 3° ano	Cadete aluno do 2° ano	Cadete aluno do 1° ano
Portuguese Navy
Portuguese Navy		Aspirante	Aspirante	Cadete aluno do 4° ano	Cadete aluno do 3° ano	Cadete aluno do 2° ano	Cadete aluno do 1° ano
Portuguese Air Force
Portuguese Air Force			Aspirante-a-Oficial	Cadete aluno do 4° ano	Cadete aluno do 3° ano	Cadete aluno do 2° ano	Cadete aluno do 1° ano
(Portugal) National Republican Guard
(Portugal) National Republican Guard			Aspirante

== Other ranks ==
The rank insignia of non-commissioned officers and enlisted personnel.

NATO code	OR-9		OR-8	OR-7	OR-6	OR-5		OR-4		OR-3	OR-2		OR-1
Portuguese Army
Portuguese Army	Sargento-mor	Sargento-chefe	Sargento-ajudante	Primeiro-sargento	Segundo-sargento	Furriel	Segundo-furriel	Cabo de secção		Cabo-adjunto	Primeiro-cabo	Segundo-cabo	Soldado
Portuguese Navy												No insignia	No insignia
Portuguese Navy	Sargento-mor	Sargento-chefe	Sargento-ajudante	Primeiro-sargento	Segundo-sargento	Subsargento		Cabo-mor	Cabo	Primeiro-marinheiro	Segundo-marinheiro	Primeiro-grumete	Segundo-grumete
Portuguese Air Force
Portuguese Air Force	Sargento-mor	Sargento-chefe	Sargento-ajudante	Primeiro-sargento	Segundo-sargento	Furriel	Segundo-furriel	Cabo-de-secção		Cabo-adjunto	Primeiro-cabo	Segundo-cabo	Soldado
(Portugal) National Republican Guard
(Portugal) National Republican Guard	Sargento-mor	Sargento-chefe	Sargento-ajudante	Primeiro-sargento	Segundo-sargento	Furriel		Cabo-mor	Cabo-chefe	Cabo-de-curso	Cabo	Guarda principal	Guarda
NATO code	OR-9		OR-8	OR-7	OR-6	OR-5		OR-4		OR-3	OR-2		OR-1

== Historical ranks ==
=== Commissioned officer ranks ===
Rank group	General / flag officers			Senior officers			Junior officers
Portuguese Army (c. 1914)
Portuguese Army (c. 1914)	Marechal (Note: Almirante and Marechal were only honorary ranks, not held by anyone during World War I.)		General (Note: The Portuguese Army had the particularity of having only a single rank of General Officer. A Portuguese General could be assigned to command from a division to the entire Army.)	Coronel (Note: The brigade's organization was British Army model, so the brigade commander was this rank.)	Tenente-coronel	Major	Capitão	Tenente	Alferes
Portuguese Navy (c. 1914)
Portuguese Navy (c. 1914)	Almirante	Vice-almirante	Contra-almirante	Capitão de mar e guerra	Capitão de fragata	Capitão-tenente	Primeiro-tenente	Segundo-tenente	Guarda-marinha

=== Other ranks ===
NATO code	OR-9		OR-8	OR-7	OR-6	OR-5		OR-4	OR-3	OR-2		OR-1
Portuguese Army (c. 1988)
Portuguese Army (c. 1988)	Sargento-mor	Sargento-chefe	Sargento-ajudante	Primeiro-sargento	Segundo-sargento	Furriel	Segundo-furriel			Primeiro-cabo	Segundo-cabo	Soldado
Portuguese Navy (c. 1988)										No insignia		No insignia
Portuguese Navy (c. 1988)	Sargento-mor	Sargento-chefe	Sargento-ajudante	Primeiro-sargento	Segundo-sargento	Subsargento		Cabo	Marinheiro	Primeiro-grumete		Segundo-grumete
Portuguese Air Force (c. 1988)
Portuguese Air Force (c. 1988)	Sargento-mor	Sargento-chefe	Sargento-ajudante	Primeiro-sargento	Segundo-sargento	Furriel	Segundo-furriel			Primeiro-cabo	Segundo-cabo	Soldado
NATO code	OR-9		OR-8	OR-7	OR-6	OR-5		OR-4	OR-3	OR-2		OR-1

== Lusophone comparative tables ==
- Army
  - Officers
  - Enlisted
- Navy
  - Officers
  - Enlisted
- Air force
  - Officers
  - Enlisted
- Military police
  - Officers
  - Enlisted
