= Military ranks and insignia of Chile =

The military ranks and insignia of Chile are the military insignia used by the Chilean Armed Forces.

== Comparative tables ==
=== Officers ===
Rank group	General / flag officers				Senior officers			Junior officers
Chilean Army
Chilean Army	General de ejército	General de división	General de brigada	Brigadier	Coronel	Teniente coronel	Mayor	Capitán	Teniente		Subteniente	Alférez
Chilean Navy
Chilean Navy	Almirante	Vicealmirante	Contraalmirante	Comodoro	Capitán de navío	Capitán de fragata	Capitán de corbeta	Teniente 1°	Teniente 2°		Subteniente	Guardiamarina
Chilean Air Force
Chilean Air Force	General de aire	General de aviación	General de brigada aérea	Comodoro	Coronel de aviación	Comandante de grupo	Comandante de escuadrilla	Capitán de bandada	Teniente		Subteniente	Alférez
Carabineros de Chile
Carabineros de Chile	General director	General inspector	General		Coronel	Teniente coronel	Mayor	Capitán	Teniente		Subteniente
Chilean Gendarmerie
Chilean Gendarmerie	Director nacional	Subdirector operativo			Coronel	Teniente coronel	Mayor	Capitán	Teniente 1°	Teniente 2°	Subteniente
Rank group	General / flag officers				Senior officers			Junior officers

==== Student officer ranks ====
Rank group	Student officer
Chilean Air Force
Chilean Air Force	Cadete

=== Enlisted ===
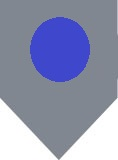
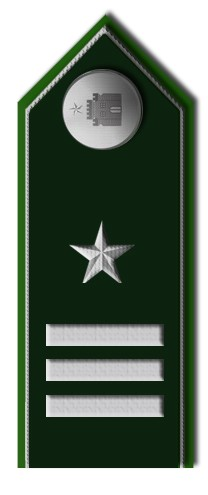
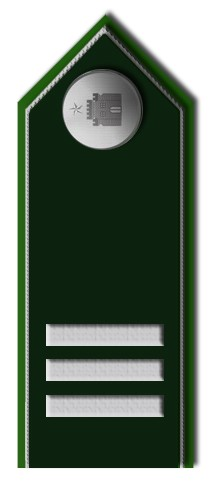
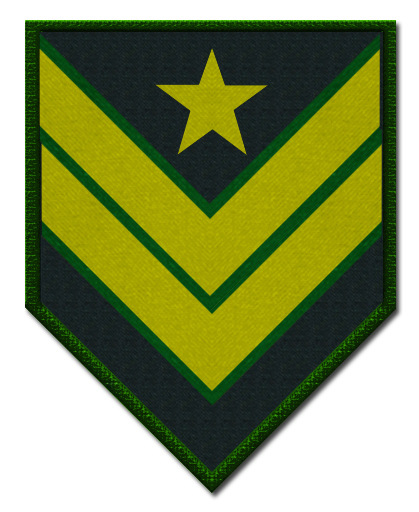
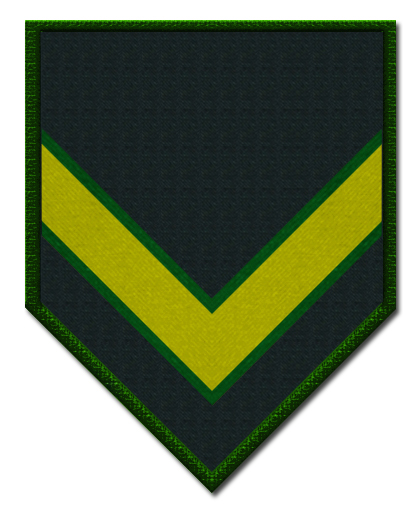
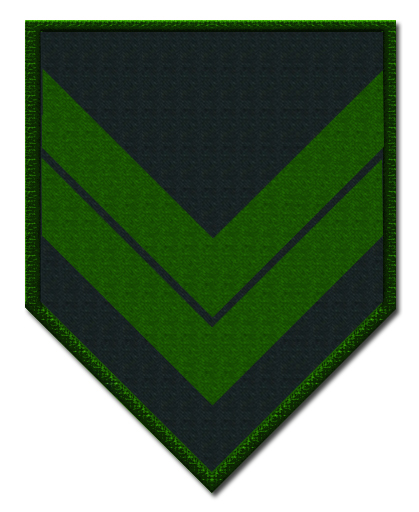
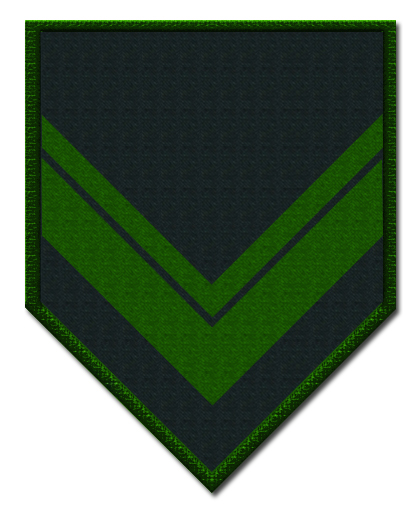
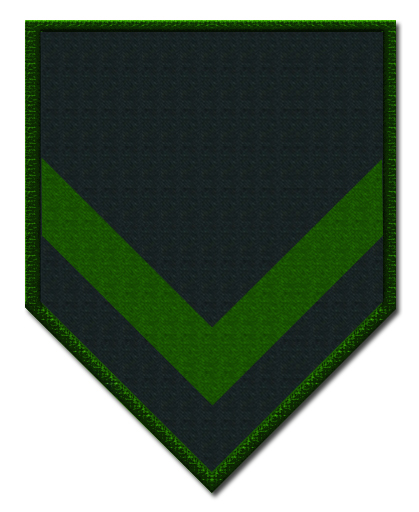
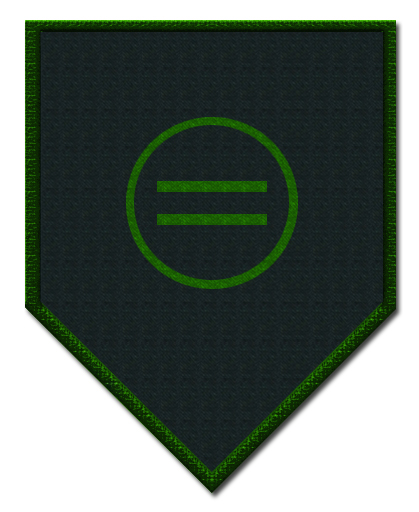
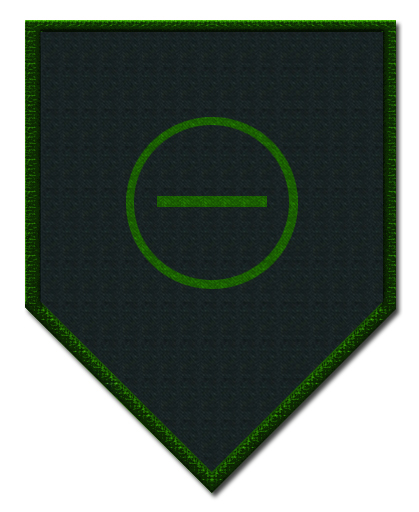
Rank group	Senior NCOs				Junior NCOs			Enlisted
Chilean Army
Chilean Army	Suboficial mayor	Suboficial	Sargento primero	Sargento segundo	Cabo primero	Cabo segundo	Cabo			Soldado de tropa profesional
Chilean Navy
Chilean Navy	Suboficial mayor	Suboficial	Sargento primero	Sargento segundo	Cabo primero	Cabo segundo		Marinero primero		Marinero segundo
Chilean Air Force								No insignia
Chilean Air Force	Suboficial mayor	Suboficial	Sargento primero	Sargento segundo	Cabo primero	Cabo segundo	Cabo	Soldado de tropa profesional		Alumno
Carabineros de Chile											No insignia
Carabineros de Chile	Suboficial mayor	Suboficial	Sargento primero	Sargento segundo	Cabo primero	Cabo segundo				Carabinero	Carabinero alumno
Chilean Gendarmerie
Chilean Gendarmerie	Suboficial mayor	Suboficial	Sargento primero	Sargento segundo	Cabo primero	Cabo segundo	Cabo	Gendarme primero	Gendarme segundo	Gendarme	Gendarme alumno
Rank group	Senior NCOs				Junior NCOs			Enlisted

== Army ==
An aspiring non-commissioned officer or officer in the Chilean Army undergoes studies at these two schools, both located in the Santiago Metropolitan Region:

- Gen. Bernardo O'Higgins Military School (for officers)
- Sgt. Daniel Rebolledo Sepúlveda Army NCO School (for non-commissioned personnel)

Upon graduation, they become a commissioned officer (Ensign) or non-commissioned officer (Corporal), and then move on to the branch of their choice, except for newly recruited soldiers, whose primary rank is Soldado Dragonante or Soldier Dragonite, and are immediately enrolled as part of the Army NCO School in Maipú.

Military ranks (just as is the case in Ecuador) are similar to those in the Prussian and later German armies, including the Prussian Fähnrich rank for officers. The "Captain General" rank, first used by Bernardo O'Higgins and later by presidents Ramón Freire and Augusto Pinochet, is now inactive.

The ranks used in the Army today are from the 2002 reorganization. It keeps the old enlisted ranks (Privates, Corporals, Sergeants and Sub-Officers) but a new General Officer rank scheme is used, with three General ranks instead of four.

Officers

Officer ranks are mostly derived from those in the German army, with some remnants from other influences. While field grade and senior grade officer rank insignia show German influence, general officer rank insignia are inspired by those used in the French Army, but in red shoulder straps with two to four white stars. However, during the Pinochet government, golden stars were used, which was changed in December 2005 during the command in chief of Juan Emilio Cheyre for return to the original design of the generals ranks.

Rank group	General / flag officers				Senior officers			Junior officers
Chilean Army
Chilean Army	General de ejército	General de división	General de brigada	Brigadier	Coronel	Teniente coronel	Mayor	Capitán	Teniente	Subteniente	Alférez
Shirt Raincoat Parka and office
Battle Duty Uniform (Center and South)
Battle Duty Uniform (North)
Abbreviation	CJE	GDD	GDB	BGR	CRL	TCL	MAY	CAP	TTE	STE	ALF	-

Former rank insignia of Capitán general created by Augusto Pinochet in 1982
Full dress uniform	
Grade	Captain General (Note: Inactive since 2008, reserved for President from Military of Chile)
Abbreviation	CGE
NATO pay grade code	OF-10

Rank	English translation	Years of service	US Army Equivalent rank/British Army Equivalent rank
Capitán General	Captain General	now inactive	General of the Army/Field Marshal/Marshal
General de Ejército	Army General		General
General de División	Divisional General		Lieutenant General
General de Brigada	Brigade General	31–32 years	Major General
Brigadier	Brigadier, Colonel Commandant		Brigadier General, Brigadier/ Colonel Commandant (honorary rank for senior Colonels)
Coronel	Colonel	26–30 years	Colonel
Teniente Coronel	Lieutenant Colonel	21–25 years	Lieutenant Colonel
Mayor	Major	16–20 years	Major
Capitán	Captain	10–15 years	Captain
Teniente	Lieutenant	5–9 years	First lieutenant/Lieutenant
Subteniente	Sublieutenant	2–4 years	Second lieutenant
Alférez	Ensign	1 year of service after graduation	Acting Lieutenant/3rd Lieutenant/Ensign
Subalférez	Junior Ensign, Sub-ensign (student)	3–4 years of study	Officer Cadet/Student Officer 1
Cadete	Cadet Officer (student)	1–2 years of stud	Officer Candidate/Student Officer 2

Enlisted ranks

All Privates and Student NCOs studying in the Army NCO School wear no rank insignia.

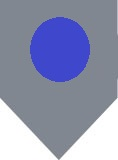
Rank group	Senior NCOs				Junior NCOs			Enlisted
Chilean Army
Chilean Army	Suboficial mayor	Suboficial	Sargento primero	Sargento segundo	Cabo primero	Cabo segundo	Cabo	Soldado de tropa profesional
Battle Duty Uniform
Abbreviation	SOM	SOF	SG1	SG2	CB1	CB2	CBO

Rank	English translation	Years of service	US Army Equivalent rank/British Army Equivalent rank
Suboficial Mayor	Senior Sub-Officer	30 years	Command Sergeant Major/Warrant Officer Class 1
Suboficial	Sub-Officer	27–29 years	Sergeant Major/ Warrant Officer Class 2
Sargento Primero	First Sergeant	24–26 years	Master Sergeant/Staff Sergeant
Sargento Segundo	Second Sergeant	19–23 years	Sergeant First Class/Sergeant
Cabo Primero	First Corporal	11–18 years	Staff Sergeant/Lance Sergeant, Master Corporal
Cabo Segundo	Second Corporal	4–10 years	Sergeant/Corporal
Cabo	Corporal	2–3 years after graduation	Corporal/Lance Corporal
Soldado	Soldier	1–5 years after recruitment, one year after graduation	Private First Class
Cabo Dragonante (student)	Corporal Dragonite (student)	2 years of study	Private
Soldado Dragonante/Alumno (student)	Soldier Dragonite (student)	1 year of study (save when recruited into the Army)	Private Basic/NCO Candidate

== Navy ==
Ranks and rates are shown on the sleeves of all Chilean Navy summer uniforms (and on the shoulder boards on winter or summer service uniforms as well for officers and WOs only). Shoulder and sleeve ranks are inspired by those in the British Royal Navy, the French Navy and the German Navy. Officers, WOs and NCOs of the Marines add the Infante de Marina (Marine Soldier) title to their ranks from Seaman onward, as the Marines are part of the Navy.

All officers, active or reserve, study at the Arturo Prat Naval Academy and later in the Naval Polytechnic Academy and the Naval War Academy receive improved training and education to be promoted as well as training in his/her specialty field while all active and reserve NCOs (known in the Navy through the general term Men of the Sea) study at the Seamen's School of the Navy "Alejandro Navarette Cisnerna" and later in the Naval Polytechnic Academy and its attached and independent colleges for later specialty training.

Officers

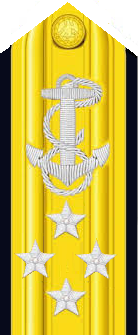
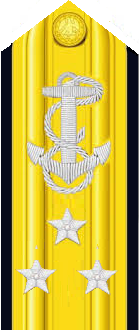
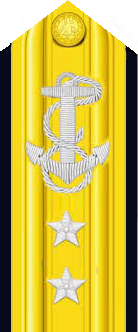
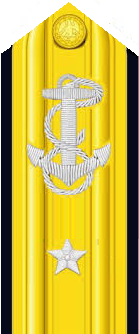
Rank group	General/flag officers				Senior officers			Junior officers
Chilean Navy
Chilean Navy	Almirante	Vicealmirante	Contraalmirante	Comodoro	Capitán de navío	Capitán de fragata	Capitán de corbeta	Teniente 1°	Teniente 2°	Subteniente	Guardiamarina
Shoulder boards
Abbreviations	A	VA	CA	CM	CN	CF	CC	T1	T2	ST	GAMA	-

Enlisted

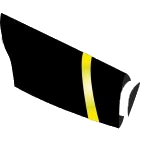
Rank group	Senior NCOs				Junior NCOs		Enlisted
Chilean Navy
Chilean Navy	Suboficial mayor	Suboficial	Sargento primero	Sargento segundo	Cabo primero	Cabo segundo	Marinero primero	Marinero segundo
Sleeve insignia
Abbreviation	SOM	SO	S1	S2	C1	C2	MRO1	MRO2

== Air force ==
Ranks and insignia, similar to the Royal Air Force but adapted to suit the origins of the Chilean Air Force, are worn on shoulder collars and cuffs. General officers have the Condor eagle in their shoulder collars while officer cadets have a unique symbol, that of the Air Force Academy "Captain Manuel Ávalos Prado", on their shoulder collars. On the NCOs and enlistees, only Subofficer Majors and Subofficers wear both shoulder and cuff insignia, while NCO cadets wear a double capital letter E (for the Air Force Specialties School "Flight Sergeant Adolfo Menandier Rojas") on their shoulder collars alongside their unique cuff marking.

Officer ranks (SS.OO.)

The officer ranking system and insignia are similar to the RAF pattern of ranks, save for the General officer ranks, modified to suit the British style ranks, and the Colonel rank. Other ranks with foreign influences are that of Air Brigade General, a general officer rank in the French Air Force, and Air General, a general officer rank in the Spanish Air Force and the Bolivian and Colombian air forces.

Rank group	General / flag officers				Senior officers			Junior officers
Service Cap
Chilean Air Force
Chilean Air Force	General de aire	General de aviación	General de brigada aérea	Comodoro	Coronel de aviación	Comandante de grupo	Comandante de escuadrilla	Capitán de bandada	Teniente	Subteniente	Alférez
Shoulder
Gala Cap
Sleeve (full dress)
Camouflage ranks
Abbreviation	C.J.	G.D.A.	G.B.A.	COM.	C.D.A.	C.D.G.	C.D.E.	C.D.B.	TTE.	STE.	ALF.	-

Noncommissioned and enlisted ranks

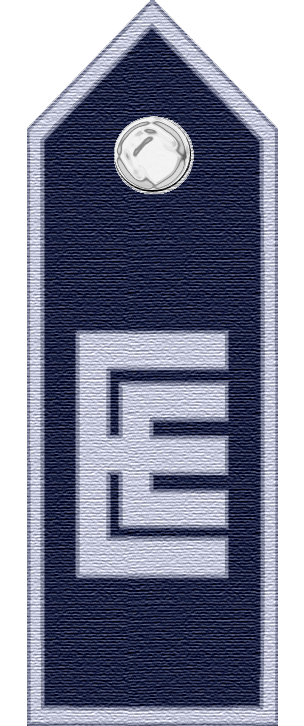
Rank group	Senior NCOs				Junior NCOs			Enlisted
Chilean Air Force								No insignia
Chilean Air Force	Suboficial mayor	Suboficial	Sargento primero	Sargento segundo	Cabo primero	Cabo segundo	Cabo	Soldado de tropa profesional	Alumno
Shoulder				–	–	–	–
Abbreviation	SOM	SOF	SG1	SG2	CBO1	CBO2	CBO	-	-

Officer badges

Line Corps
Badge
Arm of service	Aviation	Engineering	Air Defense	Telecommunications and Information Technology	Administration	Air Base
Abbreviation	(A)	(I)	(DA)	(TI)	(AD)	(BA)
Specialty	Aviators (Fighter, Helicopter) and Air transport officers	Aviation engineers	Air defense	Information and telecommunications engineers	Engineers assigned to administrative duties	Logistics

Services/Staff Corps
Badge
Arm of service	Justice	Medical Corps; Dental Corps	Chaplainancy	Bands Service	General Services Corps
Abbreviation	(J)	(S) y (SD)	(SR)	(B)	(SG)
Specialty	Attorneys and Judges	Doctors, Nurses and Dentists of various specialties	Chaplains	Musicians	Professional workers and civilian employees

Noncommissioned and enlisted badges

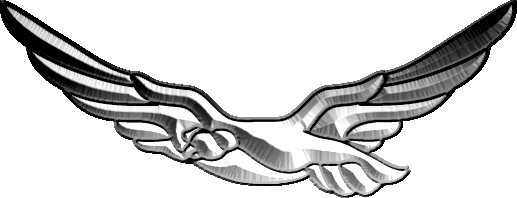
	Line Corps			Services Corps
Badge				-
Arm of service	Weapons	Technical support	Administration	Combat medicine and surgery
Specially	Air Defense; Intelligence personnel Aircrews	Maintenance and armaments Communications, information technology and electronics Air Operations Support	Administrative staff	Combat medics and surgeons

== Carabineros ==
Commissioned officers

Officers of the Carabineros, native born or foreign officers having scholarships, start out as officer aspirants at the Carabinier Officers School "Pres. Gen. Carlos Ibanez del Campo" in Santiago, and after graduating become sublieutenants either in Chile or in their home countries. Later training is provided by the Police Sciences Academy also in Santiago, and in the aforementioned specialty schools of the force.

Rank group	General / flag officers			Senior officers			Junior officers
Carabineros de Chile
Carabineros de Chile	General director	General inspector	General	Coronel	Teniente coronel	Mayor	Capitán	Teniente	Subteniente
Shirt; Raincoat; Parka
Cape
Smock
Operational shirt
Abbreviation	GNRL DIR	GNRL INS	GNRL	CRNL	TTE CRNL	MAY	CAP	TTE	SUB TTE

Enlisted personnel and non-commissioned officers

Chilean and foreign NCOs enter the service through enrollment at the Carabineros Formation School and receive further training as corporals at the Carabineros NCO Academy, both located in the Santiago Metropolitan Region, and some of them have later training at the various service schools of the Carabineros specializing in frontier defense, horsemanship and K-9 training and handling skills.

Rank group	Senior NCOs				Junior NCOs		Enlisted
Carabineros de Chile								No insignia
Carabineros de Chile	Suboficial mayor	Suboficial	Sargento primero	Sargento segundo	Cabo primero	Cabo segundo	Carabinero	Carabinero alumno
Raincoat; Parka
Smock
Operational shirt
Abbreviation	(SOM)	(SuboF)	(SG1)	(SG2)	(CBO1)	(CBO2)	(Carab)

== Gendarmerie ==
Commissioned officers

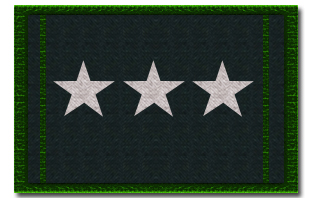
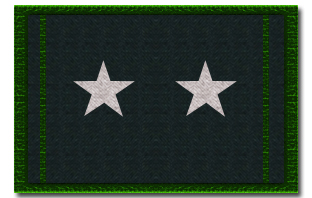
Rank group	General / flag officers		Senior officers			Junior officers
Chilean Gendarmerie
Chilean Gendarmerie	Director nacional	Subdirector operativo	Coronel	Teniente coronel	Mayor	Capitán	Teniente 1°	Teniente 2°	Subteniente
Shirt; Raincoat; Parka
Inside
Abbreviation	DIREC NAC	SDO	CRNL	TTE CRNL	MAY	CAP	TTE 1°	TTE 2°	SUB TTE	A.A.O.O

Enlisted personnel and non-commissioned officers

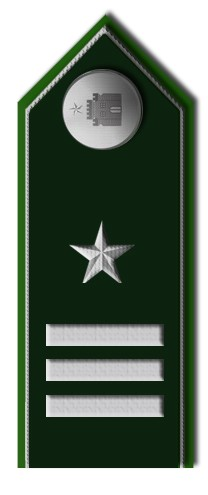
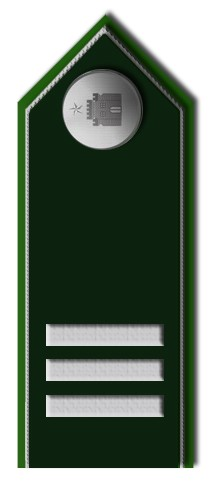
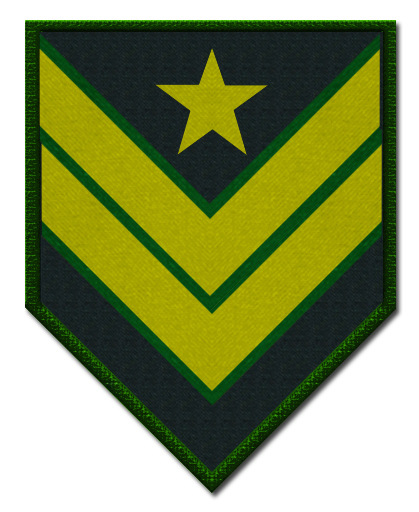
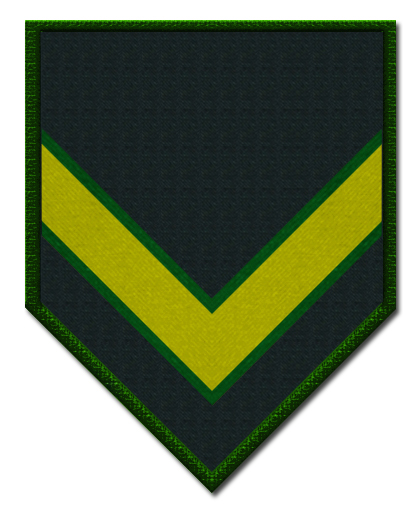
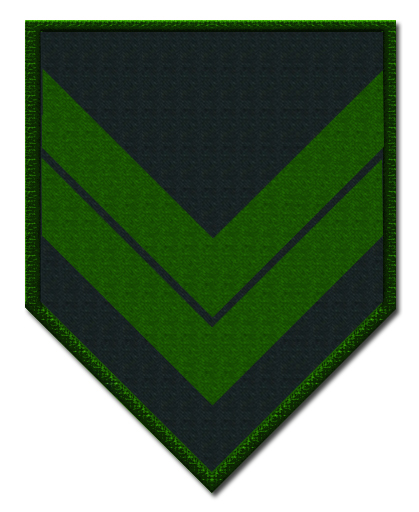
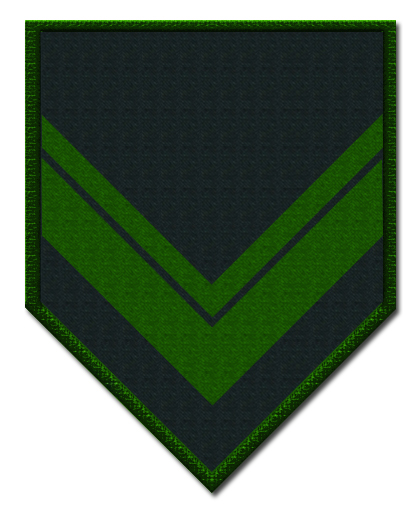
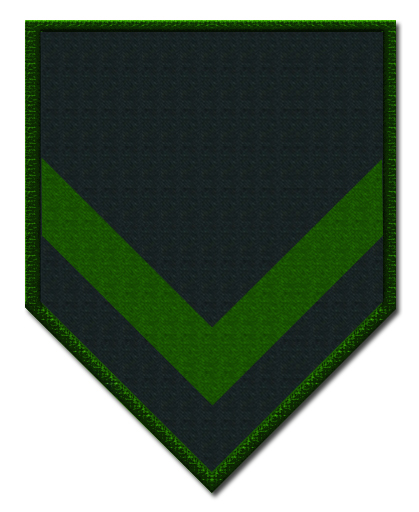
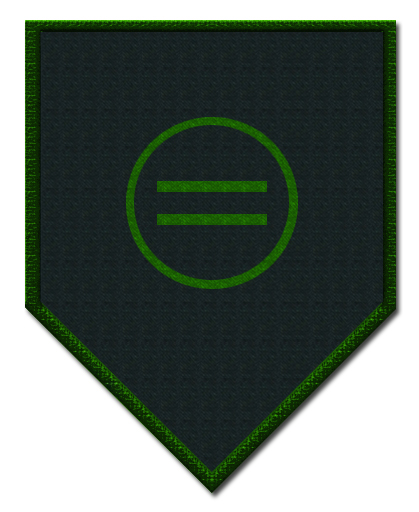
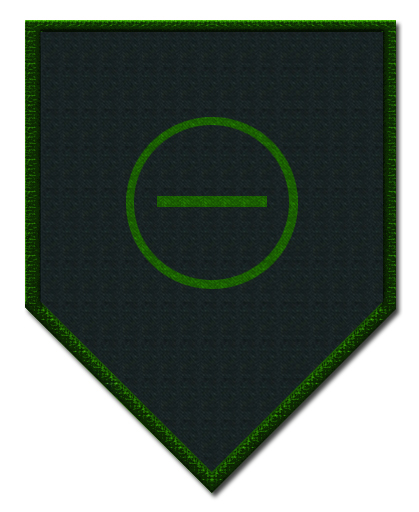
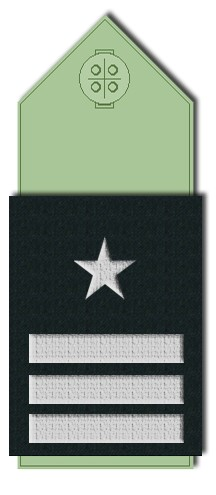
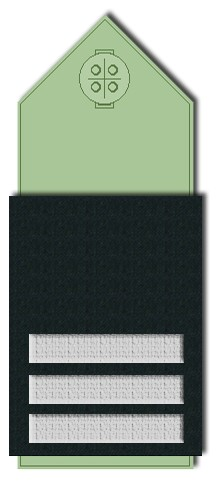
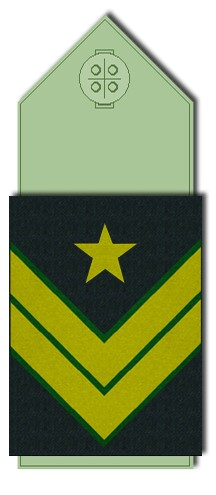
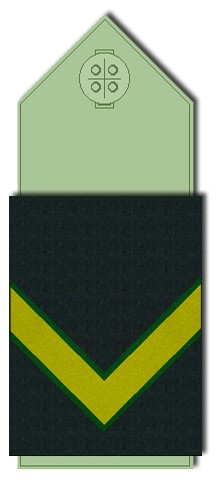
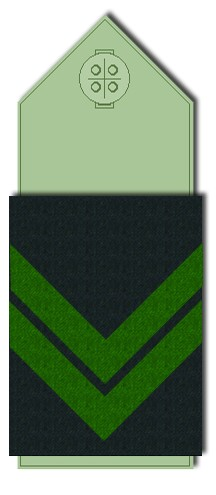
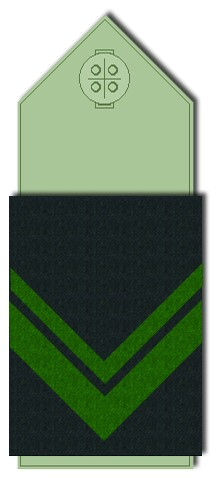
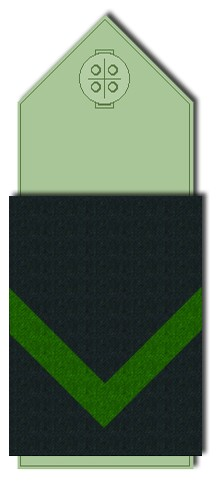
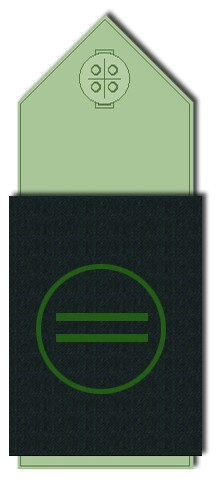
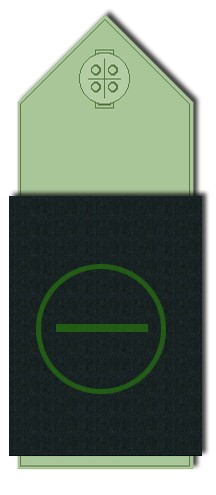
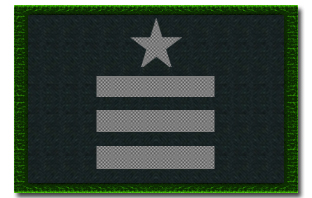
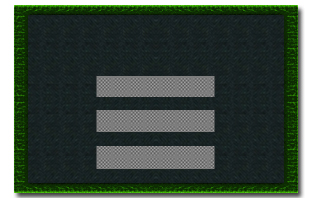
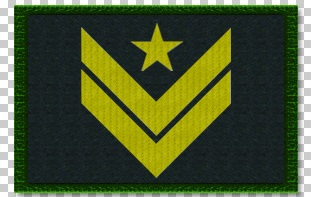
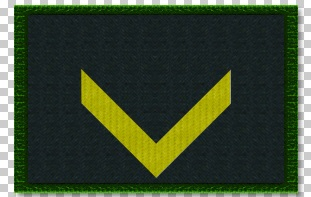
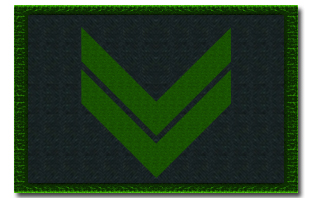
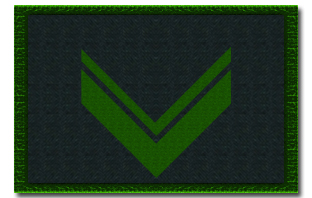
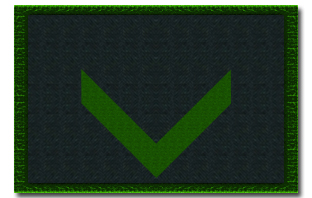
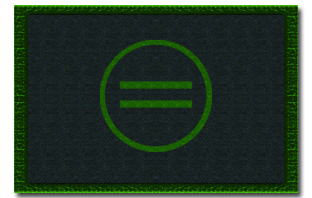
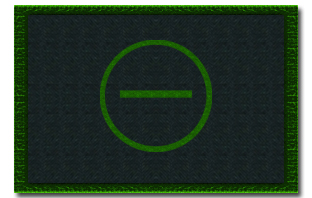
Rank group	Senior NCOs				Junior NCOs			Enlisted
Chilean Gendarmerie
Chilean Gendarmerie	Suboficial mayor	Suboficial	Sargento primero	Sargento segundo	Cabo primero	Cabo segundo	Cabo	Gendarme primero	Gendarme segundo	Gendarme	Gendarme alumno
Shirt; Raincoat; Parka										No insignia
Inside										No insignia
