= Comparative army enlisted ranks of Lusophone countries =

Rank comparison chart of Non-commissioned officer and enlisted ranks for armies/land forces of Lusophone states.

== Other ranks ==
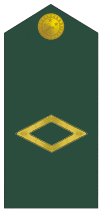
| Rank group | Senior NCOs | | | | | | | | | Junior NCOs | | | Enlisted |
|---|---|---|---|---|---|---|---|---|---|---|---|---|---|---|---|---|
| Angolan Army | | | | | | | | | | | | | | | No insignia |
| Angolan Army | Sargento-mor | | Sargento-chefe | Sargento-ajudante | Primeiro-sargento | Segundo-sargento | | | | Sub-sargento | | | Primeiro-cabo | Segundo-cabo | Soldado |
| Brazilian Army |
| Brazilian Army | Subtenente | | | | Primeiro-sargento | Segundo-sargento | | Terceiro-sargento | | Taifeiro-mor | Cabo | | Taifeiro primeira classe | | Taifeiro segunda classe | Soldado |
| Cape Verdean National Guard | | | | | | | | | | | | | | | | No insignia |
| Cape Verdean National Guard | Sargento-mor | | Sargento-chefe | Sargento-principal | Primeiro-sargento | Segundo-sargento | Sargento | Furriel | Instruendo curso de sargento | Cabo-principal | Cabo de Secção | Cabo-adjunto | Primeiro-cabo | Segundo-cabo | Instruendo curso de cabo | Soldado |
| Army of Guinea-Bissau |
| Army of Guinea-Bissau | | | | | Primeiro-sargento | Segundo-sargento | | | | Terceiro-sargento | | | Primeiro-Soldado | | Soldado |
| Rank group | Senior NCOs | | | | | | | | | Junior NCOs | | | Enlisted |
| Mozambican Army |
| Mozambican Army | | | | Intendente | Primeiro-sargento | Segundo-sargento | | | | Terceiro-sargento | | Cabo | Primeiro soldado |
| Portuguese Army |
| Portuguese Army | Sargento-mor | Sargento-chefe | Sargento-ajudante | Primeiro-sargento | Segundo-sargento | Furriel | | Segundo-furriel | | Cabo de secção | | Cabo-adjunto | Primeiro-cabo | Segundo-cabo | Soldado |
| Army of São Tomé and Príncipe |
| Army of São Tomé and Príncipe | Sargento-mor | | Sargento-chefe | Sargento-ajudante | Primeiro-sargento | Segundo-sargento | Furriel | | Segundo-furriel | Cabo de Secção | | Cabo-adjunto | Primeiro-cabo | Segundo-cabo | Soldado |
| Timor-Leste Army |
| Timor-Leste Army | Sargento-mor | | Sargento-chefe | Sargento-ajudante | Primeiro-sargento | Segundo-sargento | Furriel | | Segundo-furriel | | | Cabo-adjunto | Primeiro-cabo | Segundo-cabo | Soldado |
| Rank group | Senior NCOs | | | | | | | | | Junior NCOs | | | Enlisted |
