= Comparative navy enlisted ranks of Hispanophone countries =

Rank comparison chart of Non-commissioned officer and enlisted ranks for navies of Hispanophone states.

== Other ranks ==
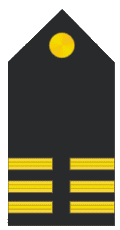
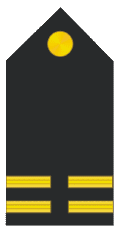
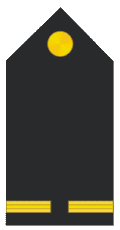
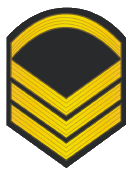
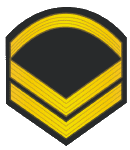
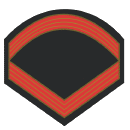
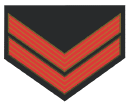
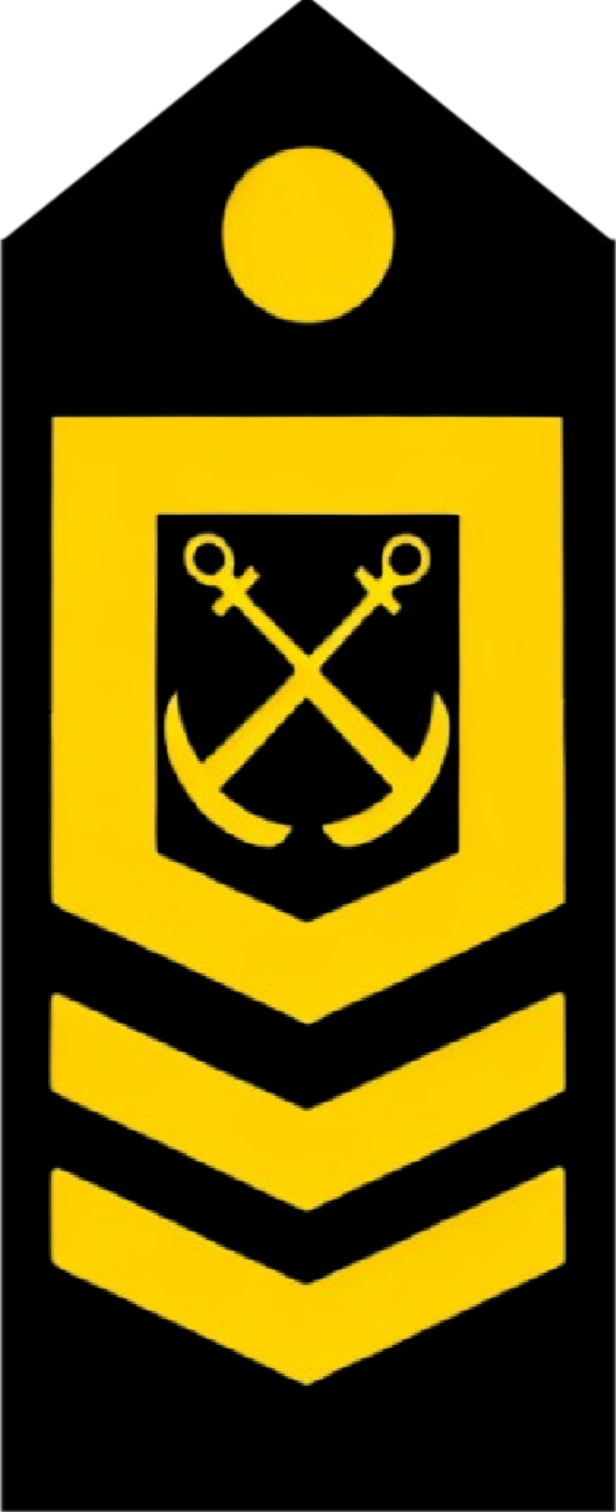
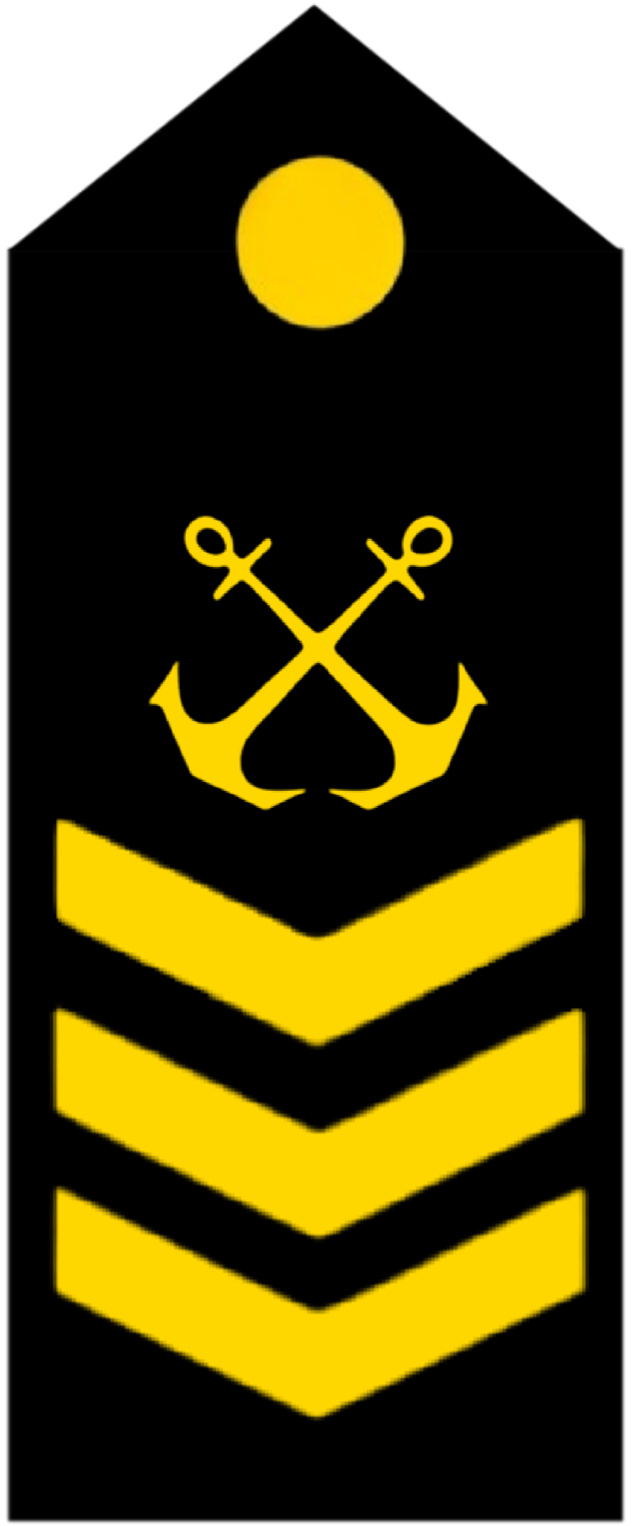
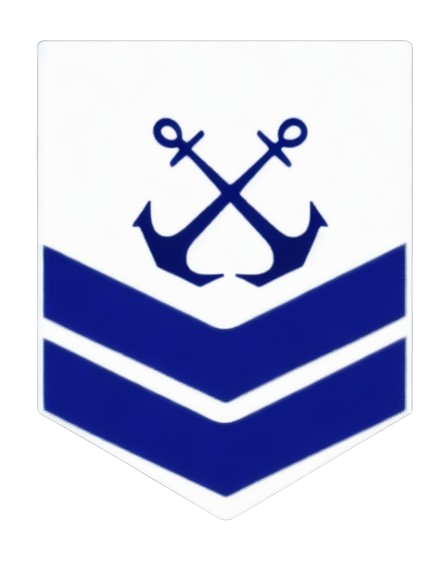
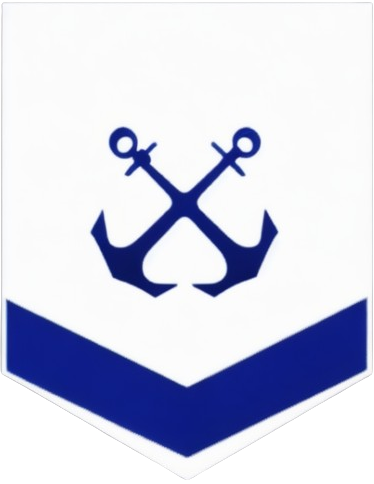
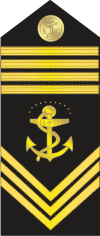
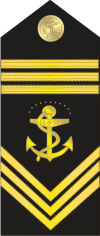
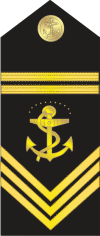
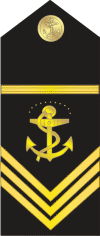
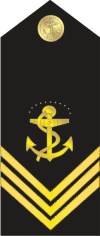
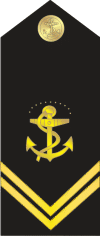
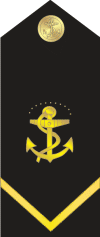
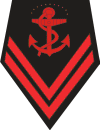
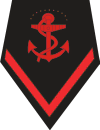
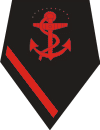
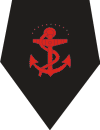
Rank group	Senior NCOs								Junior NCOs		Enlisted
Argentine Navy
Argentine Navy	Suboficial mayor			Suboficial principal	Suboficial primero	Suboficial segundo		Cabo principal	Cabo primero	Cabo segundo	Marinero primero	Marinero segundo
Bolivian Navy												No insignia
Bolivian Navy	Sub-oficial maestre	Sub-oficial mayor	Sub-oficial primero	Sub-oficial segundo	Sub-oficial inicial	Sargento primero		Sargento segundo	Sargento inicial	Cabo conscripto	Marinero de primero	Marinero de segunda
Chilean Navy
Chilean Navy	Suboficial mayor			Suboficial	Sargento primero			Sargento segundo	Cabo primero	Cabo segundo	Marinero primero	Marinero segundo
Colombian National Navy
Colombian National Navy	Suboficial jefe técnico de comando conjunto		Suboficial jefe técnico de comando	Suboficial jefe técnico	Suboficial jefe	Suboficial primero		Suboficial segundo	Suboficial tercero	Marinero primero	Marinero segundo
Costa Rica	No navy
Cuban Revolutionary Navy											No insignia	No insignia
Cuban Revolutionary Navy	Suboficial mayor	Primer suboficial	Segundo suboficial	Suboficial	Sargento primero	Sargento de segunda		Sargento de tercera		Cabo	Marinero de primera	Marinero
Dominican Navy
Dominican Navy				Sargentos mayores		Sargentos				Cabos	Marineros especialista
Ecuadorian Navy
Ecuadorian Navy	Sub-oficial mayor		Sub-oficial primero	Sub-oficial segundo	Sargento primero			Sargento segundo	Cabo primero	Cabo segundo	Marinero	Grumete 2do año	Grumete 1er año
Navy of El Salvador												No insignia
Navy of El Salvador	Maestre de flota	Maestre mayor	Maestre primero	Maestre	Sargento primero maestro	Sargento maestro		Subsargento maestro		Cabo maestro		Marinero
Navy of Equatorial Guinea
Navy of Equatorial Guinea				Brigada		Sarjento			Cabo primero	Cabo		Marinero
Honduran Navy												No insignia
Honduran Navy					Contramaestre I	Contramaestre II		Contramaestre III		Cabo de cubierta		Marino de cubierta
Rank group	Senior NCOs								Junior NCOs		Enlisted
Mexican Navy
Mexican Navy					Segundo maestre			Tercer maestre		Cabo		Marinero
Nicaraguan Navy												No insignia
Nicaraguan Navy					Sargento primero	Sargento segundo		Sargento tercero			Marino de primera	Marino
Panama	No navy
Paraguayan Navy												No insignia
Paraguayan Navy	Sub-oficial principal		Sub-oficial mayor		Sub-oficial de primera	Sub-oficial de segunda		Maestre	Cabo primero	Cabo segundo		Dragoneante
Peruvian Navy										No insignia		No insignia
Peruvian Navy	Oficial de mar primero		Oficial de mar segundo	Oficial de mar tercero	Cabo primero	Cabo segundo				Marinero		Grumete
Spanish Navy
Spanish Navy	Suboficial mayor		Subteniente	Brigada	Sargento primero	Sargento		Cabo mayor	Cabo primero	Cabo	Marinero de primera	Marinero
National Navy of Uruguay												No insignia
National Navy of Uruguay	Sub-oficial de cargo				Sub-oficial de primera	Sub-oficial de segunda			Cabo de primera	Cabo de segunda		Marinero de primera	Aprendiz
Bolivarian Navy of Venezuela
Bolivarian Navy of Venezuela	Sargento supervisor		Sargento ayudante	Sargento mayor de primera	Sargento mayor de segunda	Sargento mayor de tercera	Sargento primero	Sargento segundo	Cabo primero	Cabo segundo	Distinguido	Marinero raso
Rank group	Senior NCOs								Junior NCOs		Enlisted

== See also ==
- Comparative navy enlisted ranks of the Americas
- Ranks and insignia of NATO navies enlisted
