= Military ranks of Cuba =

The ranks of the Cuban Revolutionary Armed Forces are the military insignia used by the Cuban military.

== Current insignia ==
Between 1980-1989, Cuba used ranks and insignia based on the Soviet system, to the extent of copying the embroidery pattern on officers' shoulderboards.

Today, rank insignia are green colored for officers up to senior colonel. The rank insignia used during the early 1970s for junior officers was reinstated. Other rank insignia are now on the sleeve and are similar to those used during the Cuban Revolution by the Rebel Army. Only general rank insignia are still based on the Soviet system.

=== Officers ===
The following are the rank insignia for commissioned officers.

Rank group	Honorary ranks
Shoulder board
	Comandante en Jefe	Comandante de la Revolución

Rank group	General / flag officers				Senior officers				Junior officers
Cuban Revolutionary Army
Cuban Revolutionary Army	General de ejército	General de cuerpo de ejército	General de división	General de brigada	Primer coronel	Coronel	Teniente coronel	Mayor	Capitán	Primer teniente	Teniente	Subteniente
Cuban Revolutionary Navy
Cuban Revolutionary Navy		Almirante	Vicealmirante	Contralmirante	Capitán de flotilla	Capitán de navío	Capitán de fragata	Capitán de corbeta	Teniente de navío	Teniente de fragata	Teniente de corbeta	Alférez
Cuban Air and Air Defense Force
Cuban Air and Air Defense Force	General del Aire	General de cuerpo de ejército	General de división	General de brigada	Primer coronel	Coronel	Teniente coronel	Mayor	Capitán	Primer teniente	Teniente	Subteniente
Rank group	General / flag officers				Senior officers				Junior officers

=== Other ranks ===
The following are the rank insignia for enlisted personnel and NCOs.

Rank group	Senior NCOs							Junior NCOs	Enlisted
Cuban Revolutionary Army										No insignia
Cuban Revolutionary Army	Mayor suboficial	Primer suboficial	Segundo suboficial	Suboficial	Sargento de primera	Sargento de segunda	Sargento de tercera	Cabo		Soldado
Cuban Revolutionary Navy									No insignia	No insignia
Cuban Revolutionary Navy	Suboficial mayor	Primer suboficial	Segundo suboficial	Suboficial	Sargento primero	Sargento de segunda	Sargento de tercera	Cabo	Marinero de primera	Marinero
Cuban Air and Air Defense Force										No insignia
Cuban Air and Air Defense Force	Mayor suboficial	Primer suboficial	Segundo suboficial	Suboficial	Sargento de primera	Sargento de segunda	Sargento de tercera	Cabo		Soldado
Rank group	Senior NCOs							Junior NCOs	Enlisted

== Historical ranks ==
The Cuban system was influenced by Soviet ranks.

=== Officer ranks ===
The rank insignia of commissioned officers.

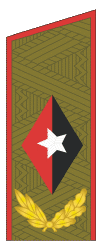
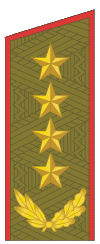
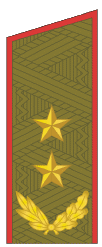
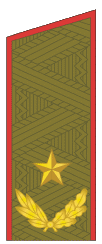
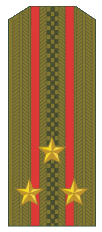
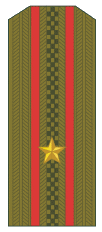
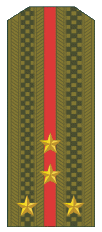
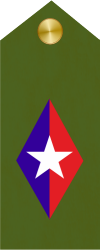
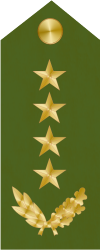
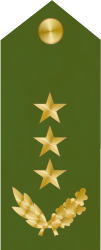
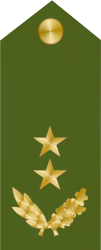
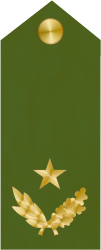
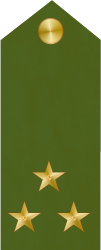
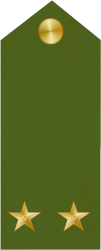
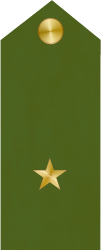
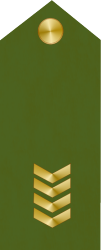
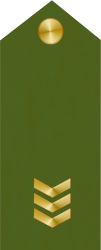
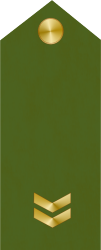
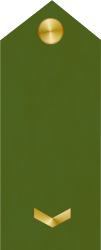
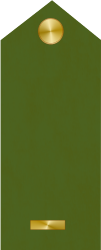
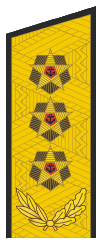
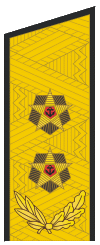
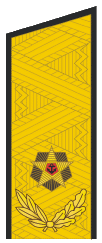
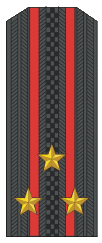
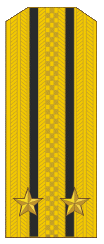
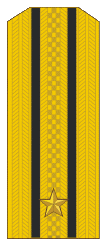
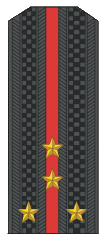
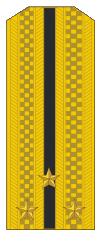
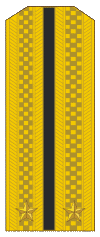
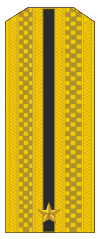
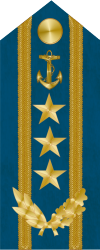
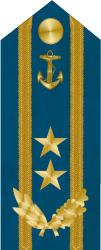
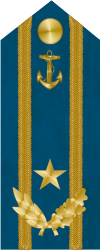
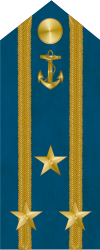
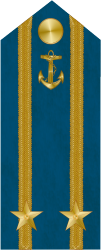
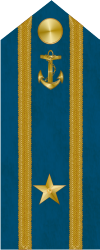
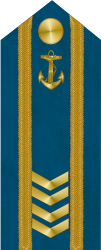
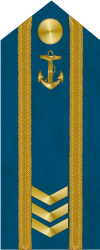
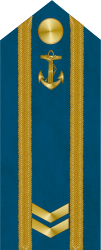
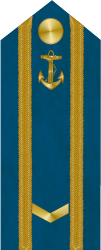
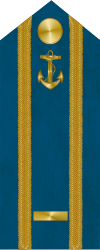
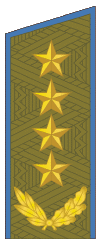
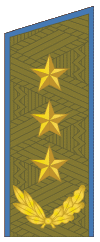
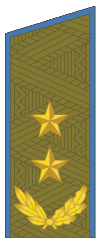
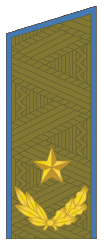
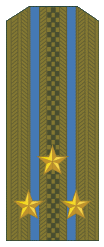
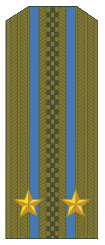
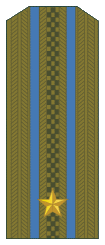
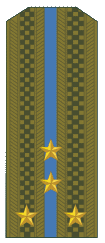
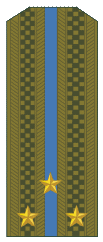
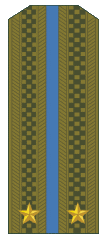
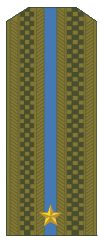
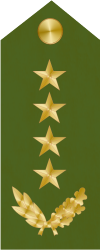
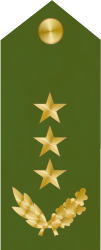
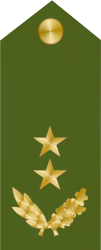
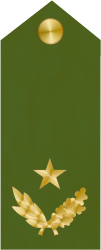
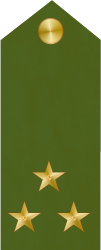
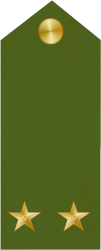
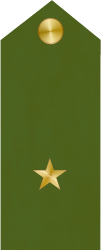
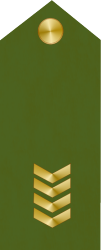
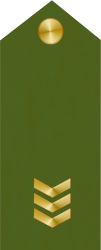
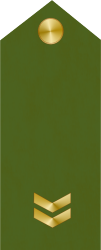
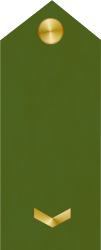
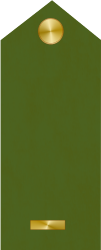
Rank group	General / flag officers					Senior officers			Junior officers
Cuban Revolutionary Army (1976–1985)
Cuban Revolutionary Army (1976–1985)	Comandante en jefe	General de ejército	General de cuerpo de ejército	General de división	General de brigada	Coronel	Teniente coronel	Mayor	Capitán		Primer teniente	Teniente	Subteniente
Cuban Revolutionary Army (1985–1990)
Cuban Revolutionary Army (1985–1990)	Comandante en jefe	General de ejército	General de cuerpo de ejército	General de división	General de brigada	Coronel	Teniente coronel	Mayor	Primer capitán	Capitán	Primer teniente	Teniente	Subteniente
Rank group	General / flag officers					Senior officers			Junior officers
Cuban Revolutionary Navy (1976–1985)
Cuban Revolutionary Navy (1976–1985)			Almirante	Vicealmirante	Contralmirante	Capitán de navío	Capitán de fragata	Capitán de corbeta	Teniente de navío		Teniente de fragata	Teniente de corbeta	Alférez
Cuban Revolutionary Navy (1985–1990)
Cuban Revolutionary Navy (1985–1990)			Almirante	Vicealmirante	Contralmirante	Capitán de navío	Capitán de fragata	Capitán de corbeta	Teniente de flotila	Teniente de navío	Teniente de fragata	Teniente de corbeta	Alférez
Rank group	General / flag officers					Senior officers			Junior officers
Cuban Revolutionary Air and Air Defense Force (1976–1985)
Cuban Revolutionary Air and Air Defense Force (1976–1985)		General del aire	Teniente general	General de división	General de brigada	Coronel	Teniente coronel	Mayor	Capitán		Primer teniente	Teniente	Subteniente
Cuban Revolutionary Air and Air Defense Force (1985–1990)
Cuban Revolutionary Air and Air Defense Force (1985–1990)		General del aire	Teniente general	General de división	General de brigada	Coronel	Teniente coronel	Mayor	Primer capitán	Capitán	Primer teniente	Teniente	Subteniente
Rank group	General / flag officers					Senior officers			Junior officers

=== Other ranks ===
The rank insignia of non-commissioned officers and enlisted personnel.

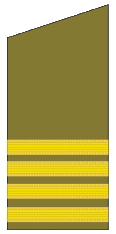
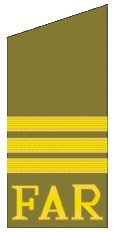
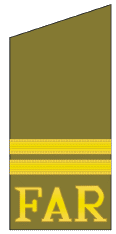
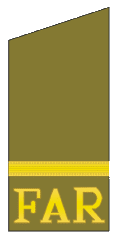
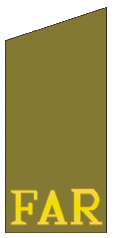
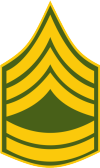
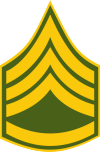
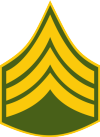
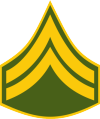
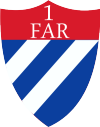
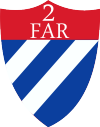
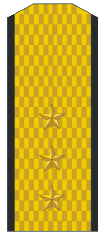
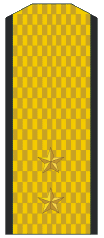
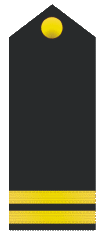
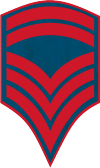
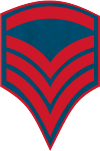
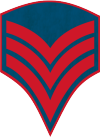
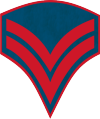
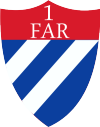
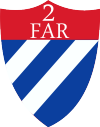
Rank group	Senior NCOs					Junior NCOs	Enlisted
Cuban Revolutionary Army (1970–1985)
Cuban Revolutionary Army (1970–1985)	Primer Sub-oficial	Sub-oficial	Sargento de primera	Sargento de segunda	Sargento de tercera		Soldado de primera	Soldado
Cuban Revolutionary Army (1985–1990)
Cuban Revolutionary Army (1985–1990)			Sargento de primera	Sargento de segunda	Sargento de tercera	Cabo	Soldado de primera	Soldado de segunda
Rank group	Senior NCOs					Junior NCOs	Enlisted
Cuban Revolutionary Navy (1970–1985)
Cuban Revolutionary Navy (1970–1985)	Primer Sub-oficial	Sub-oficial	Sargento de primera	Sargento de segunda	Sargento de tercera		Marinero de primera	Marinero
Cuban Revolutionary Navy (1985–1990)
Cuban Revolutionary Navy (1985–1990)			Sargento de primera	Sargento de segunda	Sargento de tercera	Cabo	Marinero de primera	Marinero de segunda
Rank group	Senior NCOs					Junior NCOs	Enlisted

== Republic of Cuba (1902–1959) ==
=== Commissioned officer ranks ===
The rank insignia of commissioned officers.

Rank group	General / flag officers			Senior officers			Junior officers
Cuban National Army (–1959)
Cuban National Army (–1959)	General	Mayor general	General de brigada	Coronel	Teniente coronel	Comandante	Capitán	Teniente primero	Segundo teniente	Subteniente
Cuban Constitutional Navy
Cuban Constitutional Navy	Almirante	Vicealmirante	Contralmirante	Capitán de navío	Capitán de fragata	Capitán de corbeta	Teniente de navío	Teniente de fragata	Alférez de navío	Alférez

=== Other ranks ===
The rank insignia of non-commissioned officers and enlisted personnel.

Rank group	Senior NCOs				Junior NCOs		Enlisted
Cuban National Army (–1959)								No insignia
Cuban National Army (–1959)	Suboficial	Sargento de primera	Sargento de segunda	Sargento de tercera	Cabo de primera	Cabo	Soldado de primera	Soldado raso
Cuban Constitutional Navy								No insignia
Cuban Constitutional Navy	Suboficial mayor	Sargento de primera	Sargento de segunda	Sargento de tercera	Cabo de primera	Cabo	Marinero de primera	Marinero
