= Comparative army enlisted ranks of Hispanophone countries =

== Other ranks ==
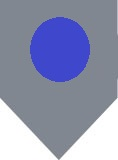
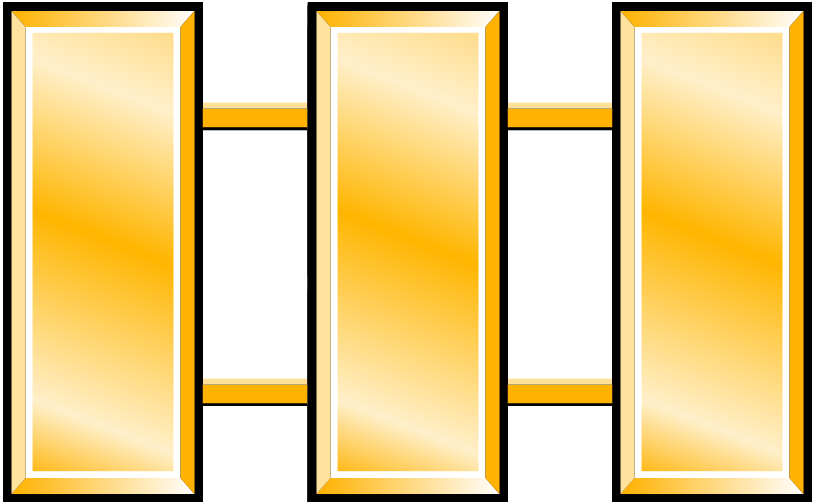
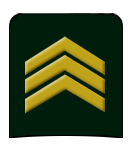
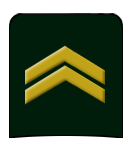
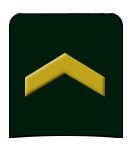
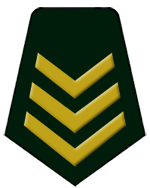
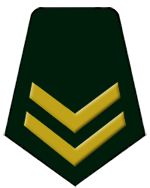
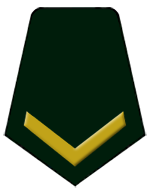
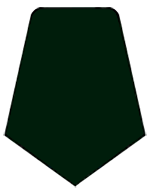
Rank group	Senior NCOs									Junior NCOs			Enlisted
Argentine Army
Argentine Army	Suboficial mayor			Suboficial principal		Sargento ayudante	Sargento primero		Sargento	Cabo primero	Cabo		Voluntario primero		Voluntario segundo	Soldado de segunda en comisión
Bolivian Army
Bolivian Army	Sub-oficial maestre		Sub-oficial mayor	Sub-oficial 1°		Sub-oficial 2°	Sub-oficial inicial		Sargento 1°	Sargento 2°	Sargento inicial°		Cabo	Dragoneante	Soldado raso
Chilean Army
Chilean Army	Suboficial mayor			Suboficial		Sargento primero			Sargento segundo	Cabo primero	Cabo segundo	Cabo			Soldado de tropa profesional
Colombian National Army																No insignia
Colombian National Army	Sargento mayor de comando conjunto	Sargento mayor de ejército	Sargento mayor de comando	Sargento mayor		Sargento primero	Sargento vice primero		Sargento segundo	Cabo primero	Cabo segundo		Cabo tercero		Soldado profesional	Soldado
Costa Rica	No army
Cuban Revolutionary Army															No insignia
Cuban Revolutionary Army	Mayor suboficial	Primer suboficial	Segundo suboficial	Suboficial		Sargento de primera	Sargento de segunda		Sargento de tercera		Cabo				Soldado
Dominican Army													No insignia
Dominican Army	Sub-teniente tercero	Sub-teniente segundo	Sub-teniente primero	Sargento mayor		Sargento de administracion	Sargento				Cabo		Raso
Ecuadorian Army
Ecuadorian Army	Sub-oficial mayor		Sub-oficial primero	Sub-oficial segundo		Sargento primero			Sargento segundo	Cabo primero	Cabo segundo				Soldado
Salvadoran Army															No insignia
Salvadoran Army	Sargento mayor de división	Sargento mayor de brigada	Sargento mayor primero	Sargento mayor		Sargento primero	Sargento		Subsargento		Cabo		Dragoneante		Soldado
Army of Equatorial Guinea
Army of Equatorial Guinea				Brigada		Sargento primero	Sarjento			Cabo primero	Cabo				Soldado
Guatemalan Army															No insignia
Guatemalan Army	Sargento mayor			Sargento técnico		Sargento primero			Sargento segundo		Cabo		Soldado de primera		Soldado
Honduran Army
Honduran Army				Sargento mayor		Sargento primero	Sargento segundo		Sargento raso		Cabo				Soldado
Rank group	Senior NCOs									Junior NCOs			Enlisted
Mexican Army
Mexican Army						Sargento primero			Sargento segundo		Cabo				Soldado
Nicaraguan Army															No insignia
Nicaraguan Army	Suboficial primero		Suboficial segundo	Suboficial		Sargento primero	Sargento segundo		Sargento tercero				Soldado de primera		Soldado
Panama	No army
Paraguayan Army
Paraguayan Army	Sub-oficial principal		Sub-oficial mayor	Sub-oficial	Sargento ayudante	Sargento primero	Vice sargento primero		Sargento segundo	Cabo primero	Cabo segundo				Soldado
Peruvian Army
Peruvian Army	Suboficial primero		Suboficial segundo	Suboficial tercero		Sargento primero	Sargento segundo				Cabo				Soldado
Spanish Army
Spanish Army	Suboficial mayor		Subteniente	Brigada		Sargento primero	Sargento		Cabo mayor	Cabo primero	Cabo		Soldado de primera		Soldado
National Army of Uruguay															No insignia
National Army of Uruguay	Suboficial mayor					Sargento de primera	Sargento			Cabo de primera	Cabo de segunda				Soldado de primera	Aprendiz
Venezuelan Army															No insignia
Venezuelan Army	Sargento supervisor		Sargento ayudante	Sargento mayor de primera		Sargento mayor de segunda	Sargento mayor de tercera	Sargento primero	Sargento segundo	Cabo primero	Cabo segundo		Distinguido		Soldado raso
Rank group	Senior NCOs									Junior NCOs			Enlisted

== See also ==
- Comparative army enlisted ranks of the Americas
- Ranks and insignia of NATO armies enlisted
