= Comparative air force enlisted ranks of Lusophone countries =

Rank comparison chart of Non-commissioned officer and enlisted ranks for air forces of Lusophone states.

== Other ranks ==
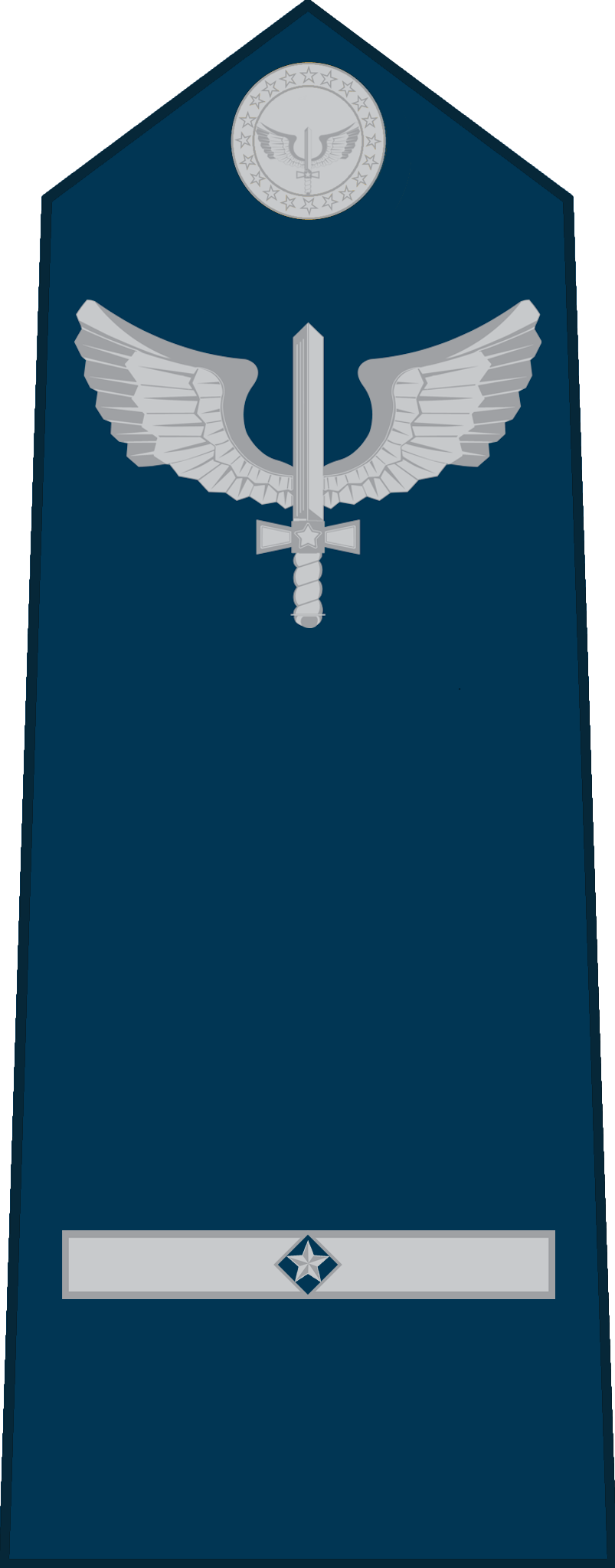
Rank group	Senior NCOs							Junior NCOs			Enlisted
National Air Force of Angola													No insignia
National Air Force of Angola	Sargento-mor		Sargento-chefe	Sargento-ajudante	Primeiro-sargento	Segundo-sargento		Subsargento			Primeiro-cabo	Segundo-cabo	Soldado
Brazilian Air Force
Brazilian Air Force	Suboficial				Primeiro-Sargento	Segundo-Sargento	Terceiro-Sargento	Cabo	Taifeiro-mor		Soldado	Taifeiro primeira classe	Soldado segunda classe	Taifeiro segunda classe
Cape Verde	No air force
Equatorial Guinea Air Force
Equatorial Guinea Air Force			Brigada	Sargento primero	Sarjento			Cabo primero		Cabo			Soldado
Guinea-Bissau	No air force
Mozambique Air Force
Mozambique Air Force				Intendente	Primeiro-sargento	Segundo-sargento		Terceiro-sargento		Cabo	Primeiro soldado
Portuguese Air Force
Portuguese Air Force	Sargento-mor	Sargento-chefe	Sargento-ajudante	Primeiro-sargento	Segundo-sargento	Furriel	Segundo-furriel	Cabo-de-secção		Cabo-adjunto	Primeiro-cabo	Segundo-cabo	Soldado
São Tomé and Príncipe	No air force
Timor-Leste Air Component
Timor-Leste Air Component	Sargento-mor		Sargento-chefe	Sargento-ajudante	Primeiro-sargento	Segundo-sargento					Primeiro-cabo		Soldado
Rank group	Senior NCOs							Junior NCOs			Enlisted
