= Comparative navy enlisted ranks of Lusophone countries =

Rank comparison chart of Non-commissioned officer and enlisted ranks for navies of Lusophone states.

== Other ranks ==
Rank group	Senior NCOs								Junior NCOs			Enlisted
Angolan Navy														No insignia
Angolan Navy	Sargento-mor		Sargento-chefe	Sargento-ajudante	Primeiro-sargento	Segundo-sargento			Sub-sargento			Cabo	Marinheiro	Grumete
Brazilian Navy
Brazilian Navy	Suboficial				Primeiro-sargento	Segundo-sargento		Terceiro-sargento	Cabo			Marinheiro
Brazilian Marine Corps
Brazilian Marine Corps	Suboficial fuzileiro naval				Primeiro-sargento fuzileiro naval	Segundo-sargento fuzileiro naval		Terceiro-sargento fuzileiro naval	Cabo fuzileiro naval			Soldado fuzileiro naval
Cape Verdean Coast Guard
Cape Verdean Coast Guard	Sargento-mor		Sargento-chefe	Sargento-principal	Primeiro-sargento	Segundo-sargento	Furriel	Segundo-furriel	Cabo-principal	Cabo de secção	Cabo-adjunto	Primeiro-cabo	Segundo-cabo
Rank group	Senior NCOs								Junior NCOs			Enlisted
Mozambique Naval Command
Mozambique Naval Command				Intendente	Primeiro-sargento	Segundo-sargento						Primeiro-cabo	Segundo-cabo	Marinheiro
Portuguese Navy													No insignia	No insignia
Portuguese Navy	Sargento-mor	Sargento-chefe	Sargento-ajudante	Primeiro-sargento	Segundo-sargento	Subsargento			Cabo-mor	Cabo	Primeiro-marinheiro	Segundo-marinheiro	Primeiro-grumete	Segundo-grumete
Coast Guard of São Tomé and Príncipe														No insignia
Coast Guard of São Tomé and Príncipe	Sargento-mor		Sargento-chefe	Sargento-ajudante	Primeiro-sargento	Segundo-sargento	Primerio-subsargento	Subsargento	Cabo		Primeiro-marinheiro	Segundo-marinheiro		Grumete
Timor-Leste Navy														Trade insignia in red on a black backing
Timor-Leste Navy	Sargento-mor		Sargento-chefe	Sargento-ajudante	Primeiro-sargento	Segundo-sargento	Primerio-subsargento	Segundo-subsargento	Cabo		Primeiro-marinheiro	Segundo-marinheiro		Grumete
Rank group	Senior NCOs								Junior NCOs			Enlisted
