= Comparative air force enlisted ranks of Francophone countries =

Rank comparison chart of Non-commissioned officer and enlisted ranks for air forces of Francophone states.

== Other ranks ==
Rank group	Senior NCOs								Junior NCOs			Enlisted
Belgian Air Component
Belgian Air Component	Adjudant-Majoor	Adjudant-chef	Adjudant	1ste sergeant-majoor		1ste sergeant-chef	1ste sergeant	Sergeant	1ste korporaal-chef	Korporaal-chef	Korporaal	1ste soldaat	Soldaat
Belgian Air Component	Adjudant-Major	Adjudant-chef	Adjudant	Premier sergent-major		Premier sergent-chef	Premier sergent	Sergent	Premier caporal-chef	Caporal-chef	Caporal	Premier soldat	Soldat
Belgian Air Component	Majoradjutant	Chefadjudant	Adjudant	1er Sergeant Major		1er Sergeant Chef	1er Sergeant	Sergeant	1er Korporal Chef	Korporal Chef	Korporal	1er soldat	Soldat
Benin	No air force
Cameroon Air Force													No insignia
Cameroon Air Force	Adjudant-chef		Adjudant			Sergent-chef		Sergent	Caporal-chef		Caporal	Soldat première	Soldat
Royal Canadian Air Force													No insignia
Royal Canadian Air Force	Chief warrant officer		Master warrant officer	Warrant officer		Sergeant			Master corporal		Corporal	Aviator (trained)	Aviator (basic)
Royal Canadian Air Force	Adjudant(e)-chef		Adjudant(e)-maître	Adjudant(e)		Sergent(e)			Caporal(e)-chef		Caporal(e)	Aviateur (formé)/ Aviatrice (formée)	Aviateur (confirmé)/ Aviatrice (confirmée)
Comoros	No air force
Air Force of the DR Congo													No insignia
Air Force of the DR Congo	Adjudant-chef	Adjudant de première classe	Adjudant	Premier sergent major	Sergent major	Premier sergent		Sergent			Caporal	Soldat de première classe	Soldat de seconde classe	Recrue
Congolese Air Force													No insignia
Congolese Air Force	Adjudant-chef		Adjudant			Sergent-chef		Sergent	Caporal-chef		Caporal	Soldat 1^{ère} classe	Soldat 2^{e} classe
Djibouti Air Force
Djibouti Air Force	Major	Adjudant-chef	Adjudant			Sergent-chef		Sergent	Caporal-chef		Caporal	Soldat de 1^{ère} classe	Soldat de 2^{ème} classe
Equatorial Guinea Air Force
Equatorial Guinea Air Force			Brigada	Sargento primero		Sarjento			Cabo primero		Cabo		Soldado
(France) French Air and Space Force
(France) French Air and Space Force	Major		Adjudant-chef	Adjudant		Sergent-chef		Sergent	Caporal-chef		Caporal	Aviateur 1^{e} classe	Aviateur 2^{e} classe
Gabonese Air Force
Gabonese Air Force	Adjudant-chef major	Adjudant-chef	Adjudant			Sergent-chef		Sergent	Caporal-chef		Caporal	Soldat première	Soldat
Guinea Air Force
Guinea Air Force	Major	Adjudant-chef	Adjudant			Sergent-chef		Sergent	Caporal-chef		Caporal	Soldat de 1^{ère} classe	Soldat de 2^{ème} classe
Haitian Aviation Corps
Ivory Coast Air Force
Ivory Coast Air Force	Adjudant-chef major	Adjudant-chef	Adjudant			Sergent-chef		Sergent	Caporal-chef		Caporal	Soldat de première classe	Soldat de seconde classe
Madagascar Air Force													No insignia
Madagascar Air Force	Adjudant-major	Adjudant-chef	Adjudant	Sergent-major		Sergent-chef		Sergent	Caporal-chef		Caporal		Soldat
Monaco	No air force
Senegalese Air Force													No insignia
Senegalese Air Force	Adjudant-chef		Adjudant			Sergent-chef		Sergent	Caporal-chef		Caporal	Soldat de première classe	Soldat
Seychelles Air Force
Seychelles Air Force	Warrant officer class 1		Warrant officer class 2	Staff sergeant		Sergeant			Corporal		Lance corporal	Private (or equivalent)
(Togo) Togolese Air Force													No insignia
(Togo) Togolese Air Force	Major	Adjudant-chef	Adjudant			Sergent-chef		Sergent	Caporal-chef		Caporal	Soldat de 1^{ère} classe	Soldat de 2^{ème} classe
Vanuatu	No air force
Rank group	Senior NCOs								Junior NCOs			Enlisted
