= Comparative army officer ranks of Lusophone countries =

Rank comparison chart of officers for armies/land forces of Lusophone states.

== Officers ==
Rank group	General / flag officers					Senior officers				Junior officers
Angolan Army
Angolan Army		General de exército	General	Tenente-general	Brigadeiro	Coronel		Tenente-coronel	Mayor	Capitão	Tenente		Sub-tenente
Brazilian Army
Brazilian Army	Marechal	General de exército	General de divisão	General de brigada		Coronel		Tenente-coronel	Major	Capitão	Primeiro tenente		Segundo tenente
Cape Verdean National Guard
Cape Verdean National Guard				Major-general	Brigadeiro-general	Coronel		Tenente-coronel	Major	Capitão	Primeiro tenente	Tenente	Subtenente
Army of Equatorial Guinea
Army of Equatorial Guinea				General de division	General de brigada	Coronel		Teniente coronel	Comandante	Capitán	Teniente		Alférez
Army of Guinea-Bissau
Army of Guinea-Bissau		General	Tenente-general	Major-general	Brigadeir-general	Coronel		Tenente-coronel	Major	Capitão	Primeiro tenente	Tenente	Subtenente
Mozambican Army
Mozambican Army		Coronel-general	Tenente-general	Major-general		Coronel		Tenente-coronel	Major	Capitão	Tenente		Alferes
Portuguese Army
Portuguese Army	Marechal do Exército	General	Tenente-general	Major-general	Brigadeiro-general	Coronel-tirocinado (Note: Colonel who has completed the General Officer training course. Between 1929 and 1937, the Coronel-tirocinado was called Brigadeiro.)	Coronel	Tenente-coronel	Major	Capitão	Tenente		Alferes
Army of São Tomé and Príncipe
Army of São Tomé and Príncipe					Brigadeiro	Coronel		Tenente-coronel	Major	Capitão	Tenente		Alferes
Timor-Leste Army
Timor-Leste Army		General	Tenente-general	Major-general	Brigadeiro-general	Coronel		Tenente-coronel	Major	Capitão	Tenente		Alferes
Rank group	General / flag officers					Senior officers				Junior officers
