= Comparative air force officer ranks of Lusophone countries =

Rank comparison chart of officers for air forces of Lusophone states.

== Officers ==
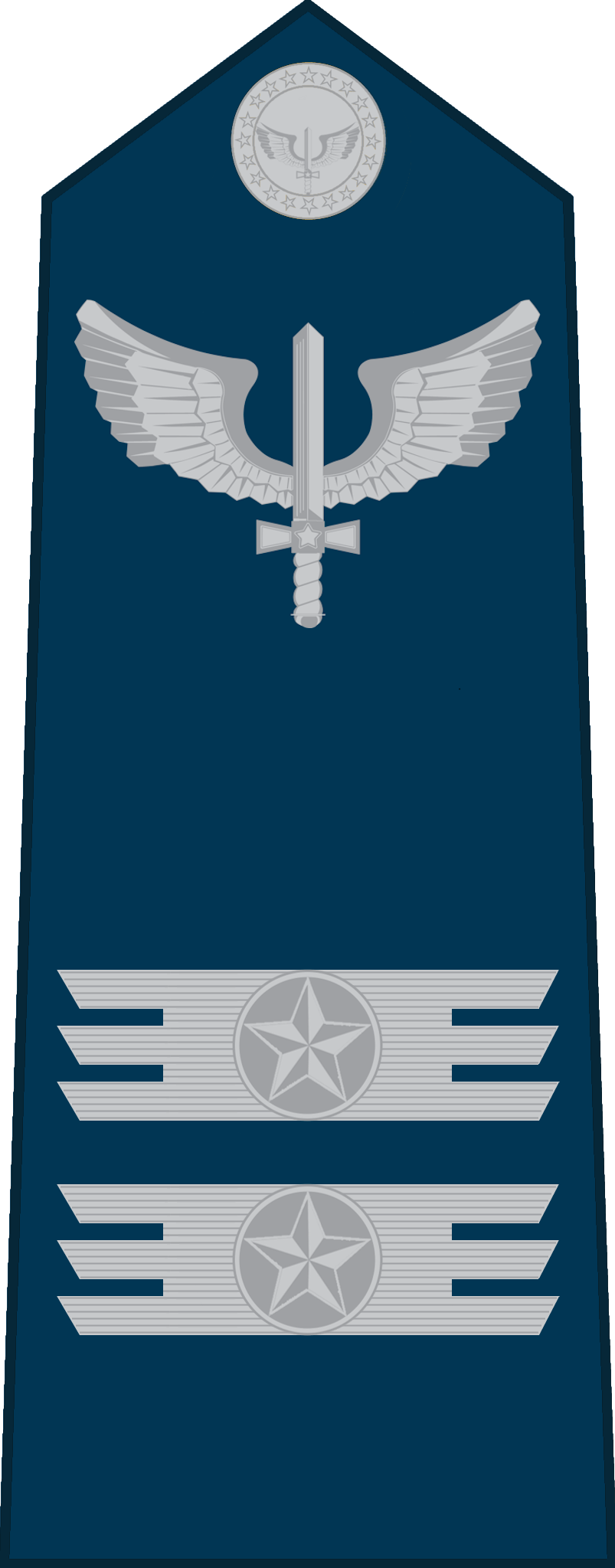
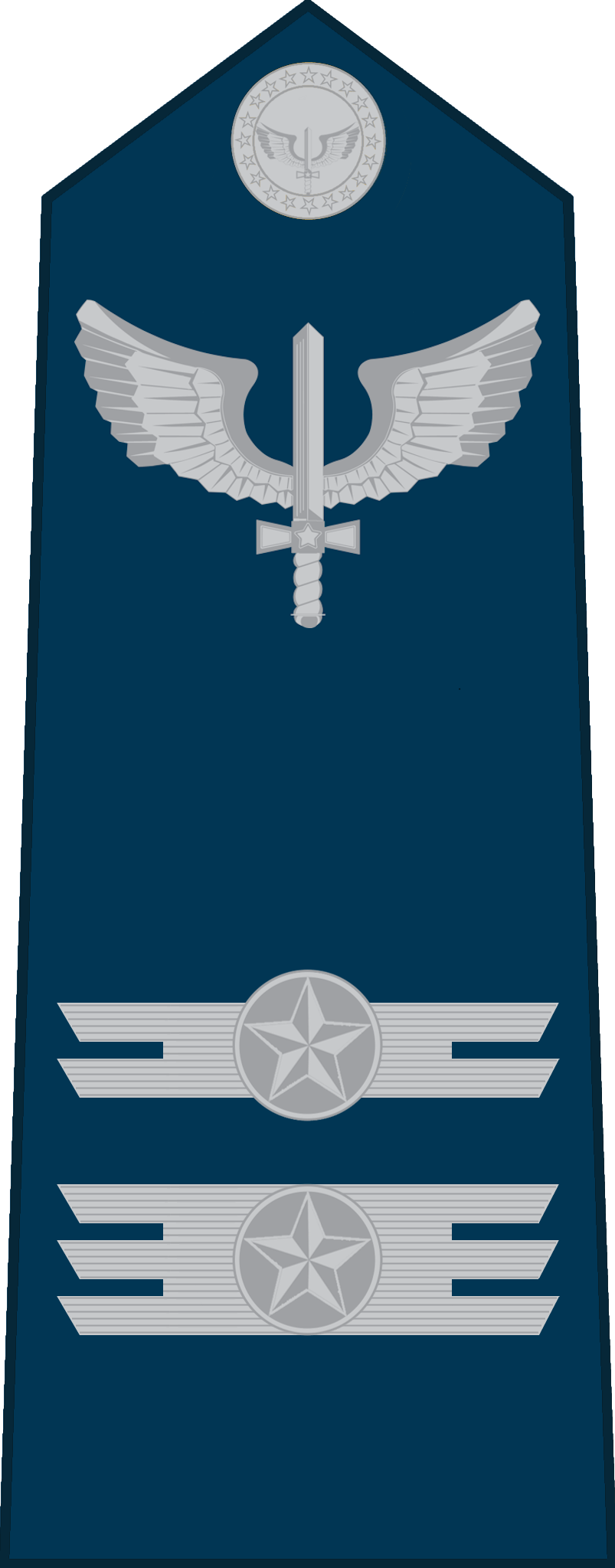
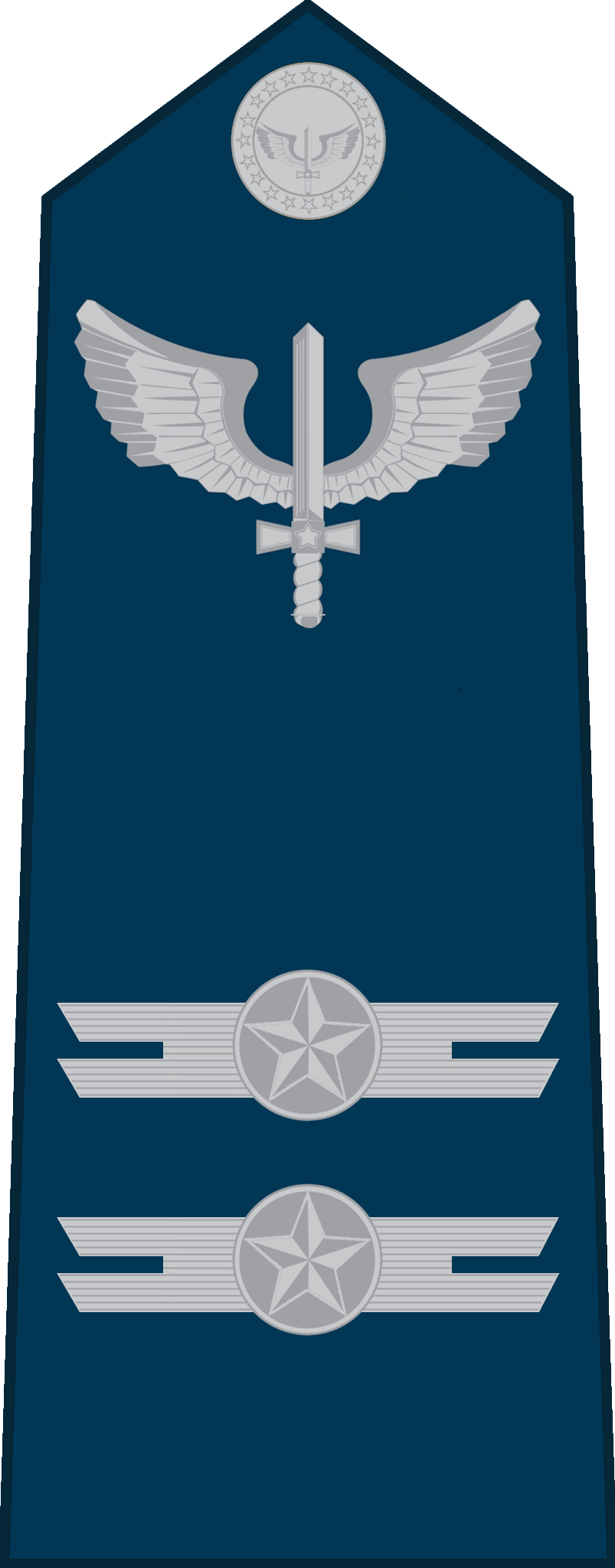
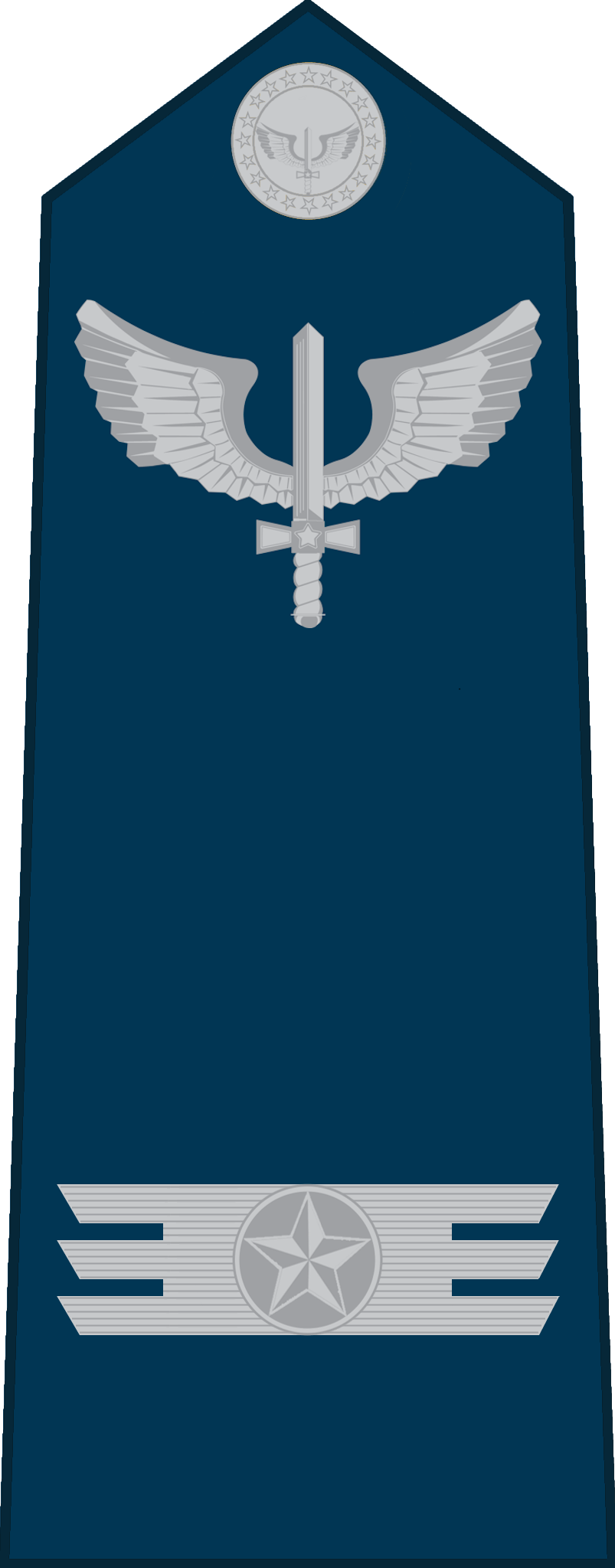
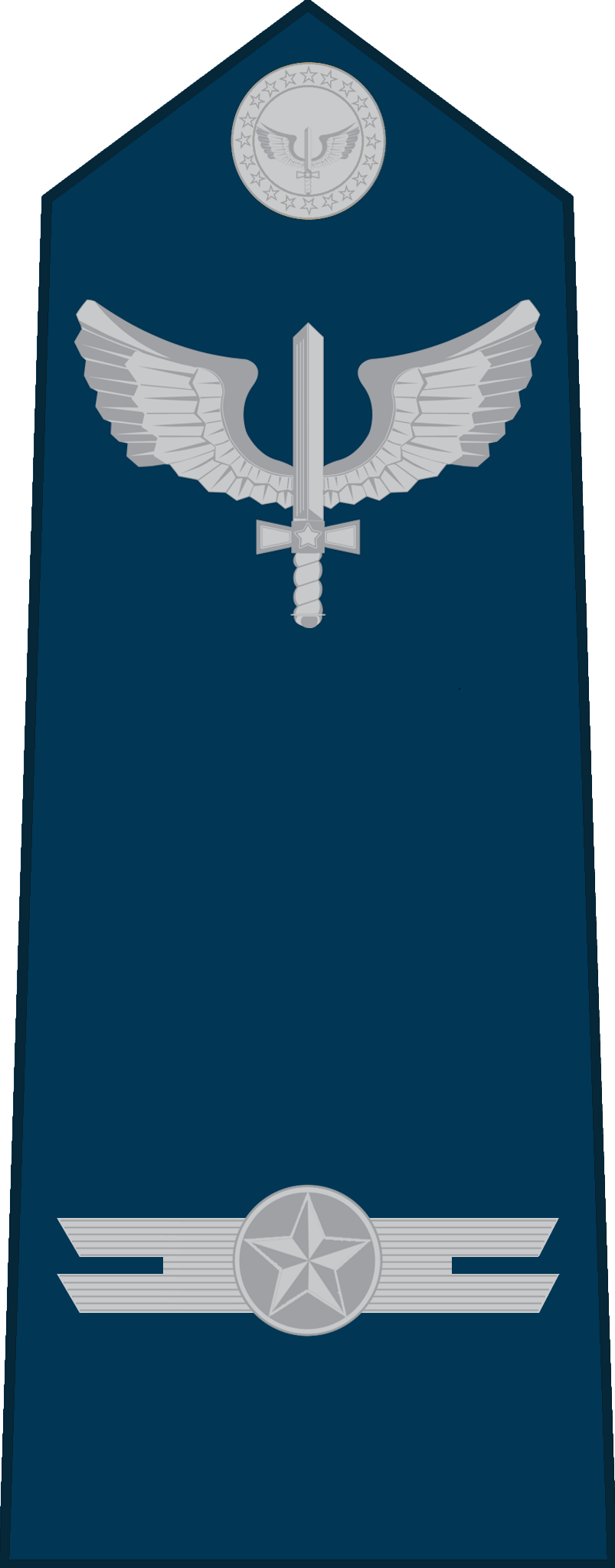
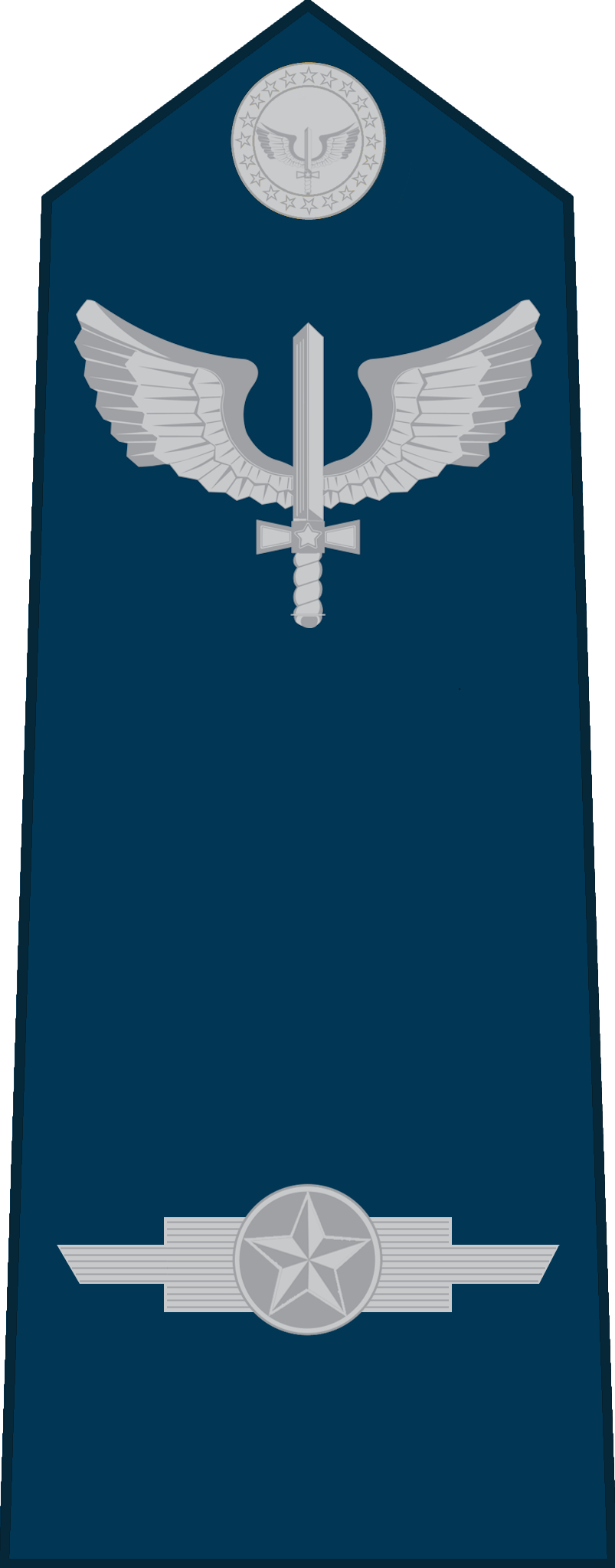
Rank group	General / flag officers					Senior officers			Junior officers
National Air Force of Angola
National Air Force of Angola		General-de-aviação	General	Tenente-general	Brigadeiro	Coronel	Tenente-coronel	Mayor	Capitão	Tenente	Sub-tenente
Brazilian Air Force
Brazilian Air Force	Marechal-do-ar	Tenente-brigadeiro do Ar	Major-brigadeiro	Brigadeiro		Coronel	Tenente-coronel	Major	Capitão	Primeiro-tenente	Segundo-tenente
Cape Verde	No air force
Equatorial Guinea Air Force
Equatorial Guinea Air Force				General de division	General de brigada	Coronel	Teniente coronel	Comandante	Capitán	Teniente	Alférez
Guinea-Bissau	No air force
Mozambique Air Force
Mozambique Air Force		Coronel General	Tenente General	Major General		Coronel	Tenente Coronel	Major	Capitão	Tenente	Alferes
Portuguese Air Force
Portuguese Air Force	Marechal da Força Aérea	General	Tenente-general	Major-general	Brigadeiro-general	Coronel	Tenente-coronel	Major	Capitão	Tenente	Alferes
São Tomé and Príncipe	No air force
Timor-Leste Air Component
Timor-Leste Air Component						Coronel	Tenente-coronel	Major	Capitão	Tenente	Alferes
Rank group	General / flag officers					Senior officers			Junior officers
