= Comparative military police enlisted ranks of Lusophone countries =

Rank comparison chart of Non-commissioned officer and enlisted ranks for military police of Lusophone states.

== Other ranks ==
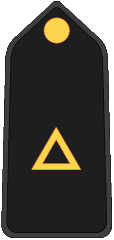
Rank group	Senior NCOs							Junior NCOs			Enlisted
Brazilian Military Police
Brazilian Military Police	Subtenente				Primeiro-sargento	Segundo-sargento	Terceiro-sargento	Cabo			Soldado primeira classe		Soldado segunda classe
(Portugal) National Republican Guard
(Portugal) National Republican Guard	Sargento-mor	Sargento-chefe	Sargento-ajudante	Primeiro-sargento	Segundo-sargento	Furriel		Cabo-mor	Cabo-chefe	Cabo-de-curso	Cabo	Guarda principal	Guarda
Rank group	Senior NCOs							Junior NCOs			Enlisted
