= Comparative military police officer ranks of Lusophone countries =

Rank comparison chart of officers for military police of Lusophone states.

== Officers ==
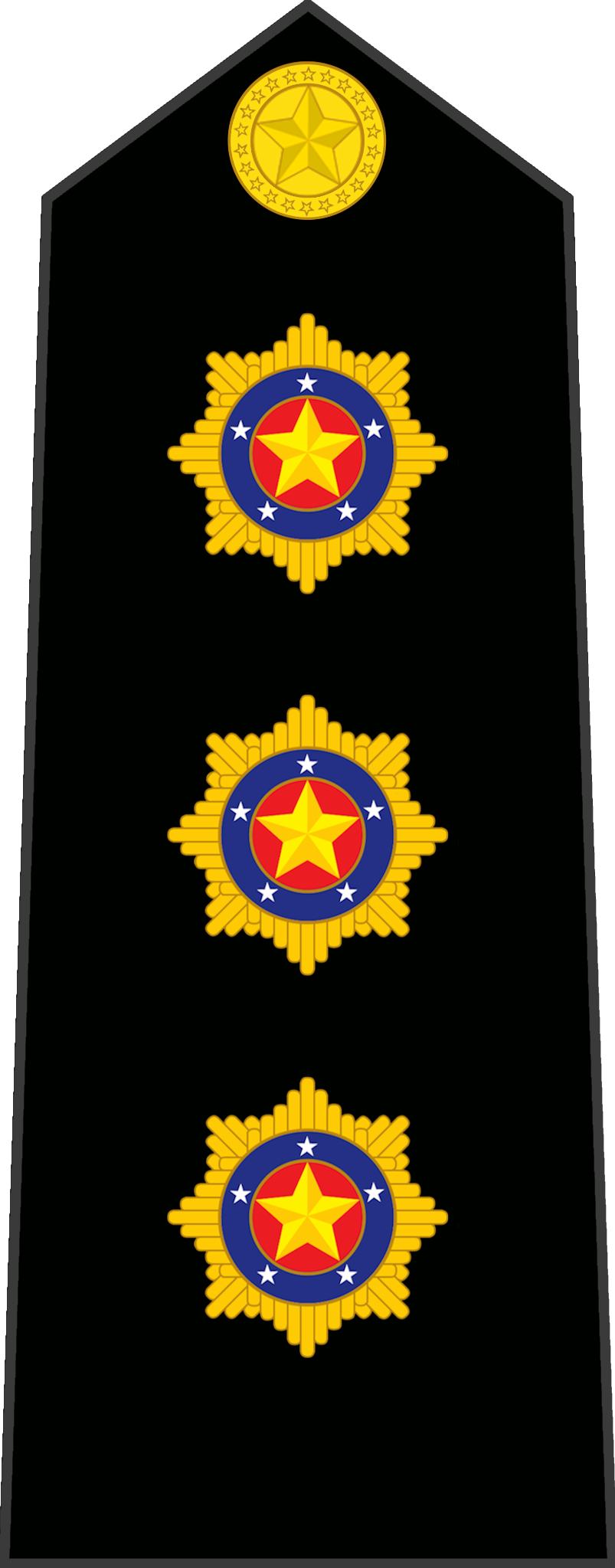
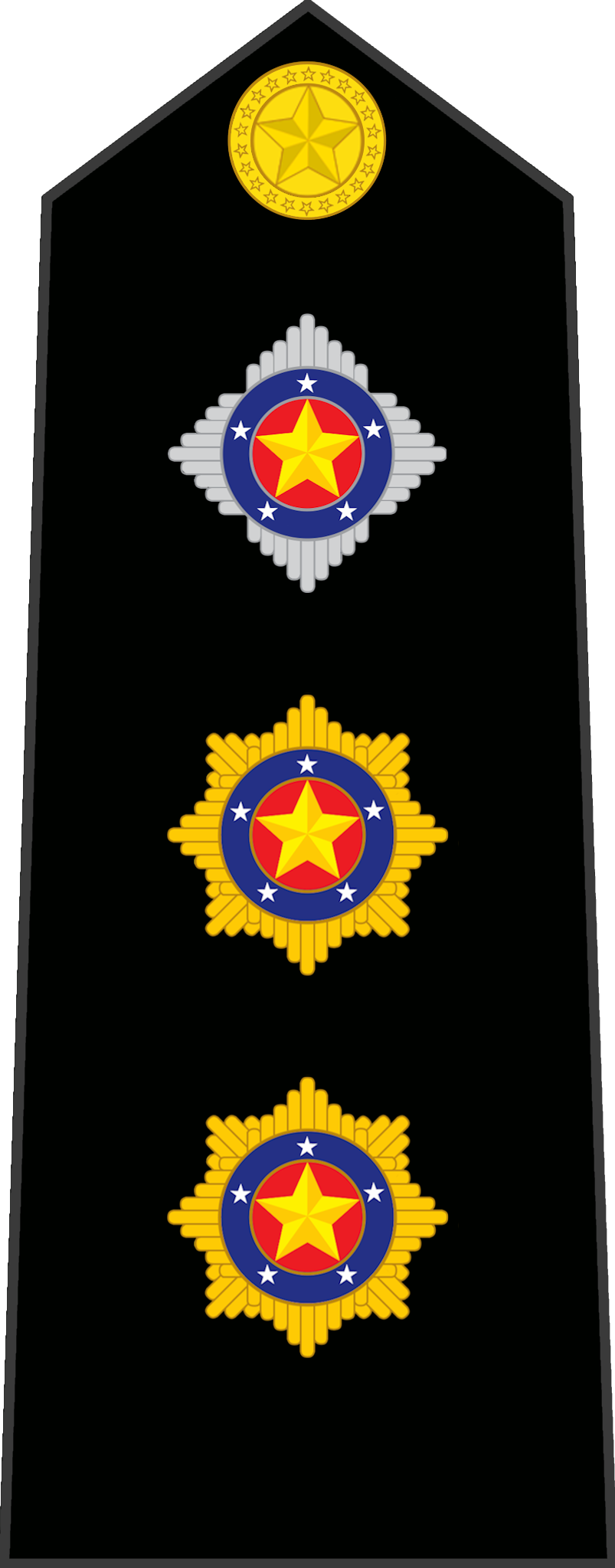
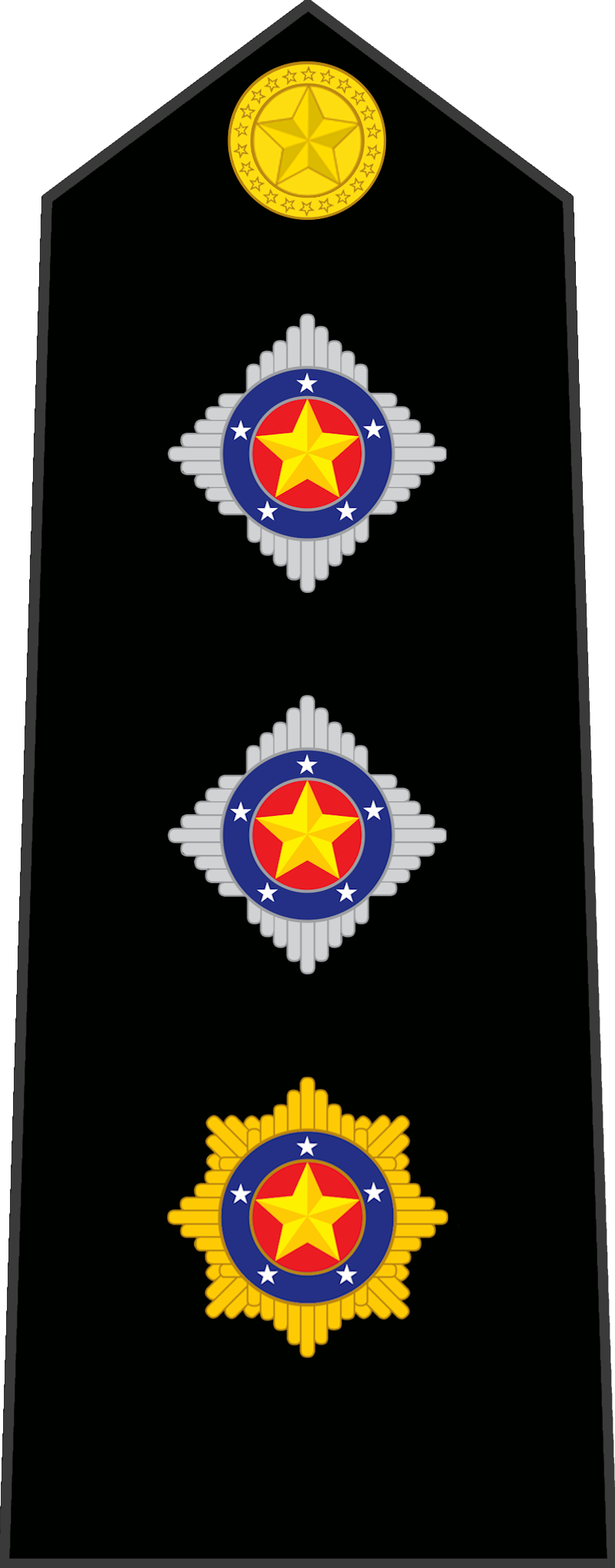
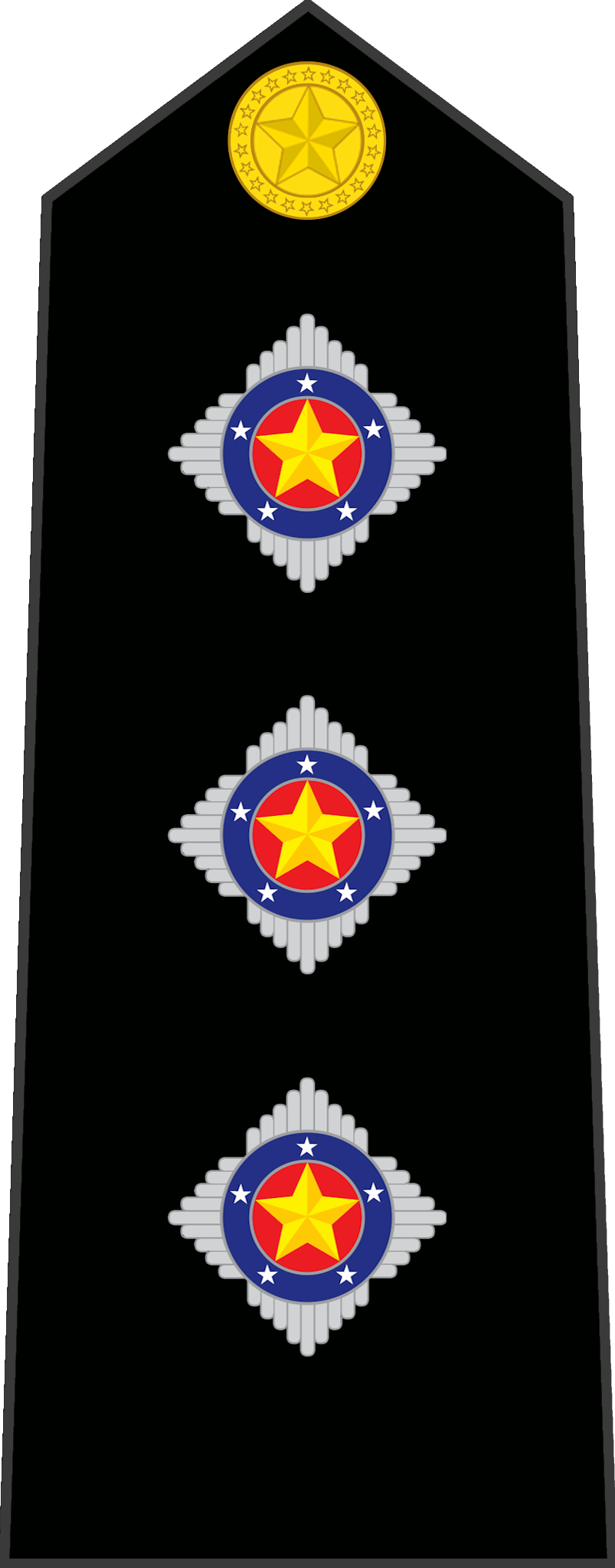
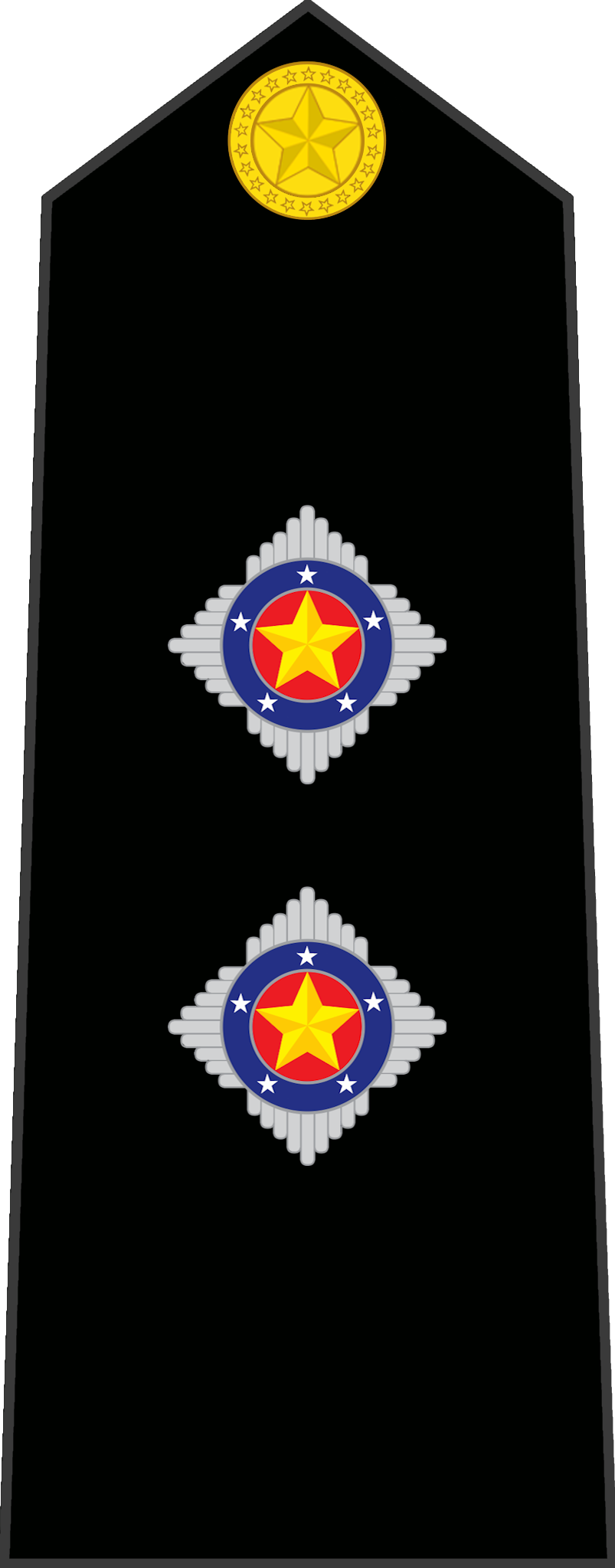
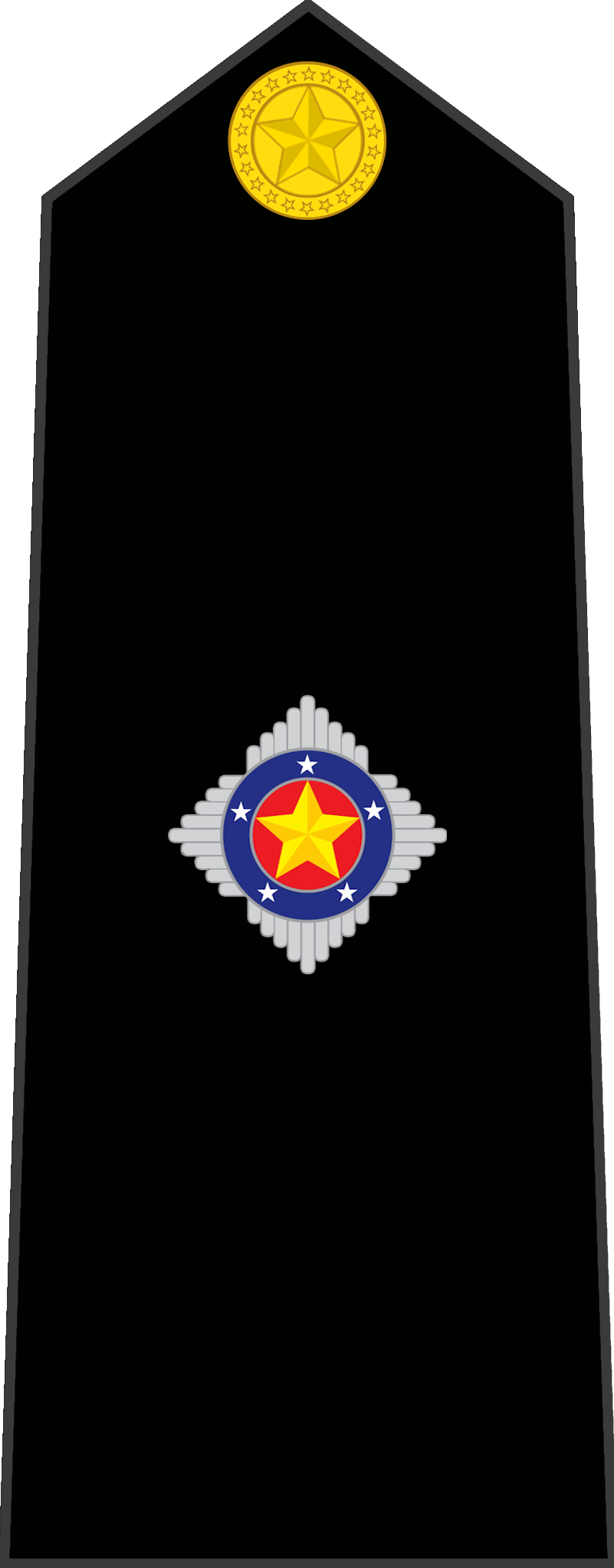
Rank group	General / flag officers			Senior officers			Junior officers
Brazilian Military Police
Brazilian Military Police				Coronel	Tenente-coronel	Major	Capitão	Primeiro tenente	Segundo tenente
National Republican Guard
National Republican Guard	Tenente-general; Comandante-general	Tenente-general	Major-general	Coronel	Tenente-coronel	Major	Capitão	Tenente	Alferes
Rank group	General / flag officers			Senior officers			Junior officers
