= Comparative navy officer ranks of Lusophone countries =

Rank comparison chart of officers for navies of Lusophone states.

== Officers ==
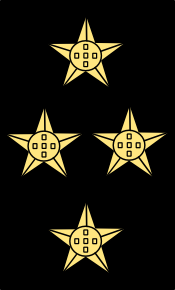
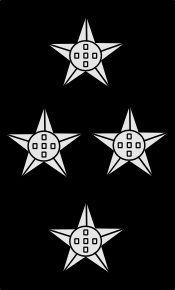
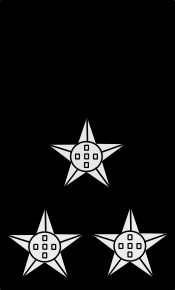
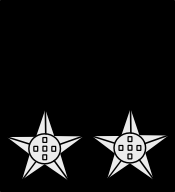
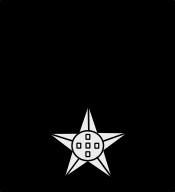
Rank group	General / flag officers					Senior officers			Junior officers
Angolan Navy
Angolan Navy		Almirante-da-Armada	Almirante	Vice-almirante	Contra-almirante	Capitão-de-mar-e-guerra	Capitão-de-fragata	Capitão-de-corveta	Tenente-de-navio	Tenente-de-fragata		Tenente-de-corveta
Brazilian Navy
Brazilian Navy	Almirante	Almirante de esquadra	Vice-almirante	Contra-almirante		Capitão de mar e guerra	Capitão de fragata	Capitão de corveta	Capitão-tenente	Primeiro-tenente		Segundo-tenente
Brazilian Marine Corps
Brazilian Marine Corps		Almirante-de-esquadra fuzileiro naval	Vice-almirante fuzileiro naval	Contra-almirante fuzileiro naval		Capitão-de-Mar-e-Guerra fuzileiro naval	Capitão-de-Fragata fuzileiro naval	Capitão-de-corveta fuzileiro naval	Capitão-tenente fuzileiro naval	Primeiro-tenente fuzileiro naval		Segundo-tenente fuzileiro naval
Cape Verdean Coast Guard
Cape Verdean Coast Guard				Contra-almirante	Comodoro	Capitão–de–mar	Capitão–de–navio	Capitão-de–patrulha	Capitão-tenente	Primeiro-tenente	Tenente	Guarda-marinha
Rank group	General / flag officers					Senior officers			Junior officers
Mozambique Naval Command
Mozambique Naval Command		Almirante	Vice-almirante	Contra-almirante		Capitão de mar e guerra	Capitão de fragata	Capitão-tenente	Primeiro-tenente	Segundo-tenente		Guarda-marinha
Portuguese Navy
Portuguese Navy	Almirante da Armada	Almirante	Vice-almirante	Contra-almirante	Comodoro	Capitão de mar e guerra	Capitão de fragata	Capitão-tenente	Primeiro-tenente	Segundo-tenente		Guarda-marinha/ Subtenente
Coast Guard of São Tomé and Príncipe
Coast Guard of São Tomé and Príncipe						Capitão de mar e guerra	Capitão de fragata	Capitão-tenente	Primeiro-tenente	Segundo-tenente		Guarda-marinha/ Subtenente
Timor-Leste Navy
Timor-Leste Navy						Capitão de Mar e Guerra	Capitão de Fragata	Capitão-tenente	Primeiro-tenente	Segundo-tenente		Guarda-marinha
Rank group	General / flag officers					Senior officers			Junior officers
