= List of Marshals of Portugal =

Marshal of Portugal Marechal
- Army rank flag

- Army and Air force sleeve insignia
- Country: Portugal
- Service branch: Portuguese Army; Portuguese Air Force
- Rank group: General officer
- NATO rank code: OF-10
- Next higher rank: None
- Equivalent ranks: Almirante da Armada

This List of Marshals of Portugal contains the names of people who received the title of Marshal-General (Portuguese: Marechal-general), Army Marshal (Marechal do Exército), or Air Marshal (Marechal da Força Aérea) in the history of the Portuguese Armed Forces.

== Marshal-Generals ==
- William, Count of Schaumburg-Lippe (1762)
- José António Francisco Lobo da Silveira, Marquis of Alvito (1768)
- João Carlos de Bragança, Duke of Lafões (1791)
- Arthur Wellesley, 1st Duke of Wellington (1809)
- William Beresford, 1st Viscount Beresford (1816)
- Nuno Caetano Álvares Pereira de Melo, Duke of Cadaval (1832)
- Louis-Auguste-Victor, Count de Ghaisnes de Bourmont (1833)
- Prince-consort Auguste de Beauharnais (1835)
- King-consort Ferdinand II of Portugal (1836)
- King Pedro V of Portugal (1855)
- King Luís I of Portugal (1861)
- King Carlos I of Portugal (1889)
- King Manuel II of Portugal (1908)

== Army Marshals ==
- José António Francisco Lobo da Silveira, Marquis of Alvito (1762)
- Christian August, Prince of Waldeck and Pyrmont (1792)
- Karl Alexander von der Goltz (1800)
- Charles du Houx de Vioménil (1801)
- William Beresford, 1st Viscount Beresford (1809)
- Manuel Pamplona Carneiro Rangel, Viscount of Beire (1833)
- Jean-Baptiste Solignac (1833)
- António José Severim de Noronha, 1st Duke of Terceira (1833)
- João Carlos de Saldanha Oliveira e Daun, 1st Duke of Saldanha (1833)
- António Vicente de Queirós, Count of Ponte de Santa Maria (1860)
- President Manuel Gomes da Costa (1926)
- President Óscar Carmona (1947)
- President António de Spínola (1981)
- President Francisco da Costa Gomes (1982)

== Air Marshals ==
- President Francisco Craveiro Lopes (1958)
- Humberto Delgado (1990 – posthumously)

== See also ==
- Marshal of Portugal

== Sources ==
- SOBRAL, José J. X., Marechais portugueses, Audaces, 2008
