= Third sergeant =

Military non-commissioned offer rank

Third sergeant is typically a non-commissioned officer rank, used in some countries.

== Brazil ==
Third sergeant is a rank in the armed forces of Brazil.

Terceiro-sargento
(Brazilian Army)

Terceiro-sargento
(Brazilian Navy)

Terceiro-sargento fuzileiro naval
(Brazilian Marine Corps)

Terceiro-sargento
(Brazilian Air Force)

Terceiro-sargento
(Brazilian Military Police)

Terceiro-sargento
(Military Firefighters Corps)

== Singapore ==
Third sergeant is a specialist rank in the Singapore Armed Forces. Third sergeants are the most junior of specialists (Non-commissioned officer). The 3SG rank insignia is three chevrons pointing down, common by all specialists, without any chevrons pointing up.

In combat units, third sergeants are usually section commanders working with the supervision of a commissioned officer holding the appointment of platoon commander, and under the supervision of a senior specialist holding the appointment of platoon sergeant.

Third sergeants in the SAF also hold equivalent junior commander appointments, assisting a platoon section of enlistees. For example, transport supervisors, commonly known as the MT (motor transport) section commanders, and such as battalion company quartermaster sergeant. In other armies, this position is usually held by staff sergeants and above, while in Singapore, conscript soldiers holding these appointments are of the rank of third sergeant due to competency and manpower.

Specialist ranks of the Singapore Armed Forces
Insignia					
Rank	Third sergeant	Second sergeant	First sergeant	Staff sergeant	Master sergeant
Abbreviation	3SG	2SG	1SG	SSG	MSG

== Gallery ==
Terceiro-sargento
(Brazilian Army)

Sargento de tercera
(Cuban Revolutionary Army)

Terceiro-sargento
(Army of Guinea-Bissau)

Terceiro-sargento
(Mozambican Army)

Sargento tercero
(Nicaraguan Army)

Third sergeant
(Singapore Army)

== See also ==
- Sergeant
- First sergeant
- Second sergeant
