= Sailor first class =

Naval rank

Sailor first class (French: Matelot de 1^{re} classe) is a rank used in the navies of many countries.

== Canada ==
As of August 2020, the Royal Canadian Navy replaced the term seaman with the gender-neutral term sailor. Leading seamen are now referred to as "sailor first class" (often abbreviated as "S1").

== NATO code ==
While the rank is used in a number of NATO countries, it is ranked differently depending on the country.

NATO code	Country	English equivalent	
NATO code	Country	UK	US
OR-3	Canada, Portugal	—N/a	Seaman
OR-2	Belgium, Netherlands, Spain	Able seaman	Seaman apprentice

== Insignia ==
Marinero primero
(Argentine Navy)

Eerste matroos
French: Premier matelot
German: Erster matrose
(Belgian Navy)

Matelot de 1^{ère} classe
(Benin Navy)

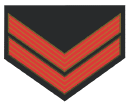
Marinero de primero
(Bolivian Naval Force)

Matelot de 1^{ère} classe
(Cameroon Navy)

Sailor 1st class
French: Matelot de 1^{ère} classe
(Royal Canadian Navy)

Marinero primero
(Chilean Navy)

Marinero primero
(Colombian National Navy)

Premier matelot
(Navy of the DR Congo)

Matelot 1^{ère} classe
(Congolese Navy)

Matelot de 1^{ère} classe
(Navy of Ivory Coast)

Matelot de 1^{ère} classe
(Royal Moroccan Navy)

Matroos der 1e klasse
(Royal Netherlands Navy)

Primeiro-marinheiro
(Portuguese Navy)

Primeiro-marinheiro
(Coast Guard of São Tomé and Príncipe)

Marinero de primera
(Spanish Navy)

Matelot de 1^{ère} classe
(Togolese Navy)
