= Alférez (rank) =

Junior officer rank in the militaries of Spain, Argentina, Chile and Uruguay

Alférez or alferes is a junior officer rank in the militaries of some Hispanophone and Lusophone countries.

The name originates from al-fāris (Arabic: الفارس), meaning "the knight", "the horseman" or "the cavalryman". However, today the rank is often translated as ensign, sub-lieutenant or second lieutenant.

The rank was first used by Iberian armies during the reconquista in the Middle Ages, being associated to the officer responsible for the carrying of a unit flag. During that time alférez was the leader of the retinue of a king or high-ranking nobleman. The famous warrior El Cid was the alférez of King Alfonso VI of Castile and Alfonso Núñez was the alférez of Duke Raymond of Galicia.

== Argentina ==
In Argentina, the rank of alférez is used by both the air force and the gendarmerie. It is, however, used differently in the two services. The air force uses the rank for newly qualified officers, while the gendarmerie uses alférez ranks as an equivalent for the army's "lieutenant" ranks.

The other armed forces of Argentina do not use the rank of ensign.

== Chile ==
In Chile, an officer cadet is known as a sub-alférez. On graduating from officer training, he becomes an alférez for a year while carrying out training specific to his branch. After this, the alférez is promoted to sub-lieutenant.

== Philippines ==
Alpéres shoulder insignia

The rank of alférez, locally spelled as alpéres, was also used by the Philippine Revolutionary Army during the Philippine Revolution and Philippine–American War. It is the lowest commissioned officer rank and is interchangeable with second lieutenant (Spanish: segundo teniente; Tagalog: ikalawang tenyente) on the service.

== Spain ==
Alférez is the lowest officer rank in Spain, immediately below lieutenant. It's also the entry level for Voluntary Reservists.

	OF-1	
Spanish Army		Alférez
Spanish Army		Alférez
Spanish Navy		
Spanish Navy	Alférez de navío	Alférez de fragata
(Spain) Spanish Air and Space Force		
(Spain) Spanish Air and Space Force		Alférez

== Gallery ==
=== Army insignia ===
Alférez
(Chilean Army)

Alférez
(Army of Equatorial Guinea)

Alferes
(Mozambican Army)

Alferes
(Portuguese Army)

Alferes
(Army of São Tomé and Príncipe)

Alférez
(Spanish Army)

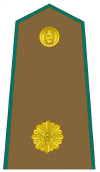
Alférez
(National Army of Uruguay)
