= Chief sergeant =

Military rank

Chief sergeant is a rank used in the armed forces of many countries. It is also a police rank in some police forces.

== NATO code ==
While the rank of chief sergeant is used in a number of NATO countries, it is ranked differently depending on the country.

NATO code	Country	English equivalent	
NATO code	Country	UK	US
OR-9	Denmark	Warrant officer class 1	Sergeant major
OR-8	Portugal	Warrant officer class 2	Master sergeant
OR-6	France	Sergeant	Staff sergeant

== Insignia of chief sergeants ==
=== Army ===
Sergent chef
(Arabic: رقيب أول, romanized: Raqib awwal)
(Algerian Land Forces)

Sargento-chefe
(Angolan Army)

Sergent-chef
(Benin Army)

Sergent-chef
(Burkina Faso Ground Forces)

Sergent-chef
(Congolese Ground Forces)

Chefsergent
(Royal Danish Army)

Sergent-chef
(French Army)

Sergent-chef
(Luxembourg Army)

Sergent-chef
(Madagascar Ground Forces)

Sergent-chef
(Mali Army)

Sergent-chef
(Royal Moroccan Army)

Sergent-chef
(Niger Army)

Sargento-chefe
(Portuguese Army)

Sergent-chef
(German: Oberwachtmeister)
(Swiss Army)

Головний сержант
Holovnyi serzhant
(Ukrainian Ground Forces)
- Royal Papua New Guinea Constabulary: Chief sergeant.
