= Second sergeant =

Military rank in several countries

Second sergeant is typically a non-commissioned officer rank, used in many countries.

== Singapore ==
Second Sergeant is a specialist rank in the Singapore Armed Forces. Second sergeants are rank above third sergeants, but below first sergeants. The rank insignia for a second sergeant features the three chevrons pointing down shared by all specialists, and one chevron pointing up.

== Gallery ==
Segundo-sargento
(Angolan Army)

Sargento segundo
(Bolivian Army)

Segundo-sargento
(Brazilian Army)

Segundo-sargento
(Cape Verdean National Guard)

Sargento segundo
(Chilean Army)

Sargento segundo
(Colombian National Army)

Sargento de segunda
(Cuban Revolutionary Army)

Sargento segundo
(Ecuadorian Army)

Sargento segundo
(Guatemalan Army)

Segundo-sargento
(Army of Guinea-Bissau)

Sargento segundo
(Honduran Army)

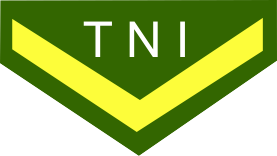
Sersan dua
(Indonesian Army)

Sargento segundo
(Mexican Army)

Segundo-sargento
(Mozambican Army)

Sargento segundo
(Nicaraguan Army)

Sargento segundo
(Paraguayan Army)

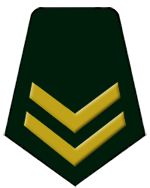
Sargento segundo
(Peruvian Army)

Segundo-sargento
(Portuguese Army)

Segundo-sargento
(Army of São Tomé and Príncipe)

Second sergeant
(Singapore Army)

Segundo-sargento
(Timor-Leste Army)

Sargento segundo
(Venezuelan Army)

== See also ==
- Sergeant
- First sergeant
- Third sergeant
