= Corporal first class =

Military rank

Corporal first class is a military rank in use by many militaries and is usually a non-commissioned officer.

== Norway ==
Corporal first class Korporal 1. klasse
- Service uniform insignia
- Country: Norway
- Service branch: Norwegian Army
- NATO rank code: OR-4
- Formation: 2015
- Abolished: 2023
- Next higher rank: Sersjant
- Next lower rank: Korporal

The rank of Corporal first class (Norwegian: korporal 1. klasse) was a military rank used by the Norwegian Army, introduced in 2015 and was used until 2023.

It was equal to ledende konstabel of the Royal Norwegian Navy and seniorspesialist of the Royal Norwegian Air Force.

== Singapore ==
Corporal first class (CFC) is the highest enlistee rank in the Singapore Armed Forces, ranking above corporal. This honourable rank is conferred on proficient and competent corporals by recommendation to the formation or division HQ. Since CFCs are groomed to be Strategic Corporals, they are usually given higher appointments or other equivalent responsibilities.

The rank was first introduced in the Singapore Armed Forces on 1 September 1988. At that time, its insignia was indicated by two downward chevrons on the arm, with a horizontal bar above the chevrons. However, the CFC rank was phased out from the NS ranks shortly after the revamp of the NS sergeant ranks in the 1990s. Reintroduced in 2008, the CFC rank insignia was redesigned with an additional arc on top of the rank insignia for a corporal.

== Gallery ==
=== Army ===
Primeiro-cabo
(Angolan Army)

Cabo primero
(Argentine Army)

Primeiro-cabo
(Cape Verdean National Guard)

Cabo primero
(Chilean Army)

Cabo primero
(Colombian National Army)

Cabo primero
(Ecuadorian Army)

Cabo primero
(Army of Equatorial Guinea)

Caporal de première classe
(Luxembourg Army)

Korporaal der 1e klasse
(Royal Netherlands Army)

Cabo primero
(Paraguayan Army)

Starszy kapral
(Polish Land Forces)

Corporal first class
(Singapore Armed Forces)

Cabo primero
(Spanish Army)

Korporaal der 1e klasse
(Suriname Army)

Primeiro-cabo
(Timor-Leste Army)

Cabo de primera
(National Army of Uruguay)

Cabo primero
(Venezuelan Army)

=== Navy ===
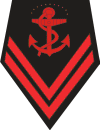
Cabo primero
(Bolivarian Navy of Venezuela)

=== Air force ===
Primeiro-cabo
(National Air Force of Angola)

Cabo primero
(Argentine Air Force)

Cabo primero
(Chilean Air Force)

Cabo primero
(Ecuadorian Air Force)

Cabo primero
(Paraguayan Air Force)

Cabo de primera
(Uruguayan Air Force)

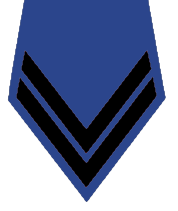
Cabo primero
(Venezuelan Air Force)

=== Marines ===
Cabo primero
(Colombian Naval Infantry)

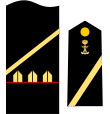
Cabo primero
(Spanish Marine Infantry)

== See also ==
- Corporal
- Second corporal
