= Second corporal =

Military rank

Second corporal is a military rank, used in some countries.

== National use ==
=== Portugal ===
Second corporal (Portuguese: segundo cabo) is an enlisted rank of the army and the air force. Its rank insignia is a single chevron. The rank is immediately below first corporal (primeiro cabo). The rank of second corporal was created in the late 19th century to replace the former rank of lance-corporal (anspeçada).

=== United Kingdom ===
Second corporal was a former rank in the Royal Engineers and Army Ordnance Corps of the British Army. Second corporals wore one rank chevron like lance-corporals, but unlike the latter, which was an appointment, they held full non-commissioned officer rank. They were thus equivalent to bombardiers in the Royal Artillery. The rank was abolished in 1920.

== Gallery ==
Segundo-cabo
(Angolan Army)

Segundo-cabo
(Cape Verdean National Guard)

Cabo segundo
(National Army of Colombia)

Cabo segundo
(Ecuadorian Army)

Cabo segundo
(Paraguayan Army)

Segundo-cabo
(Portuguese Army)

Segundo-cabo
(Timor-Leste Army)

Cabo de segunda
(National Army of Uruguay)

Cabo segundo
(Venezuelan Army)
