= Comparative army officer ranks of Francophone countries =

Rank comparison chart of officers for armies/land forces of Francophone states.

== Officers ==
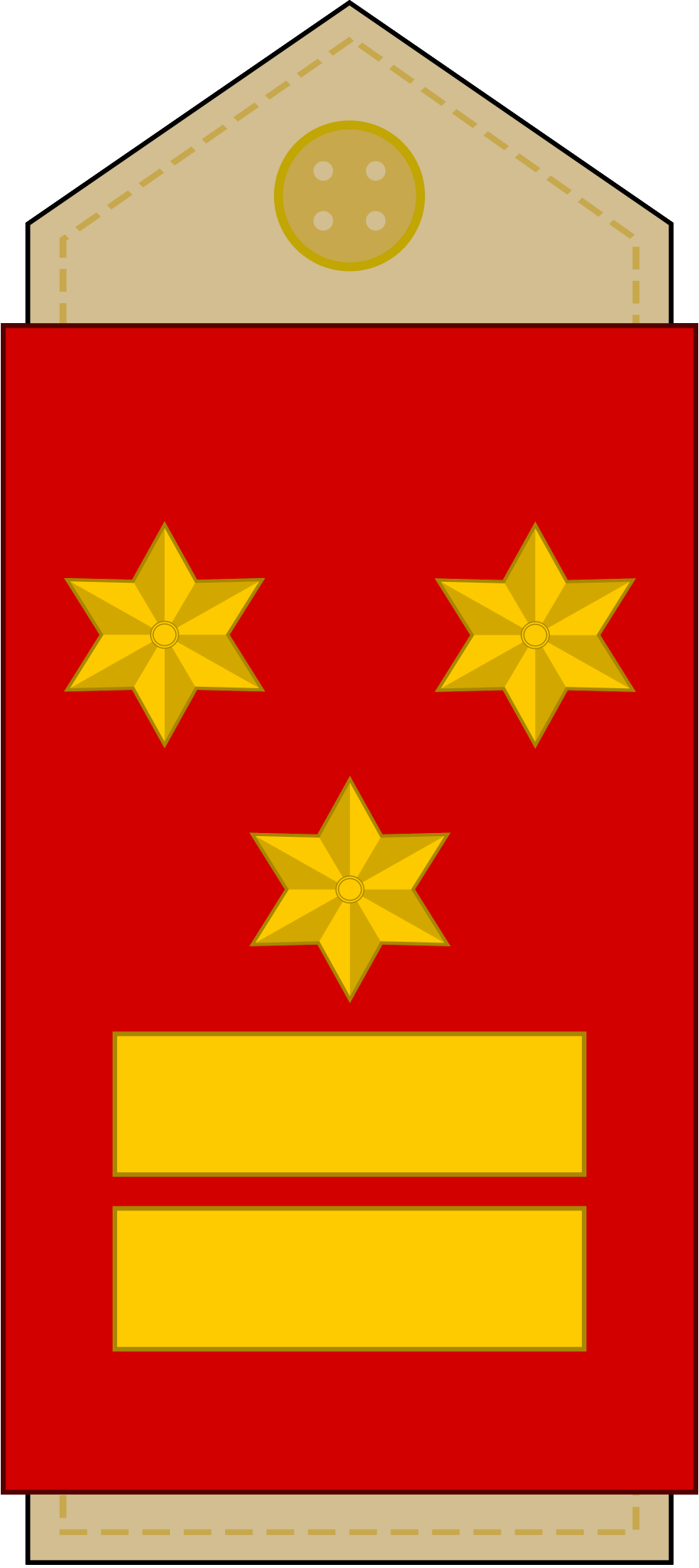
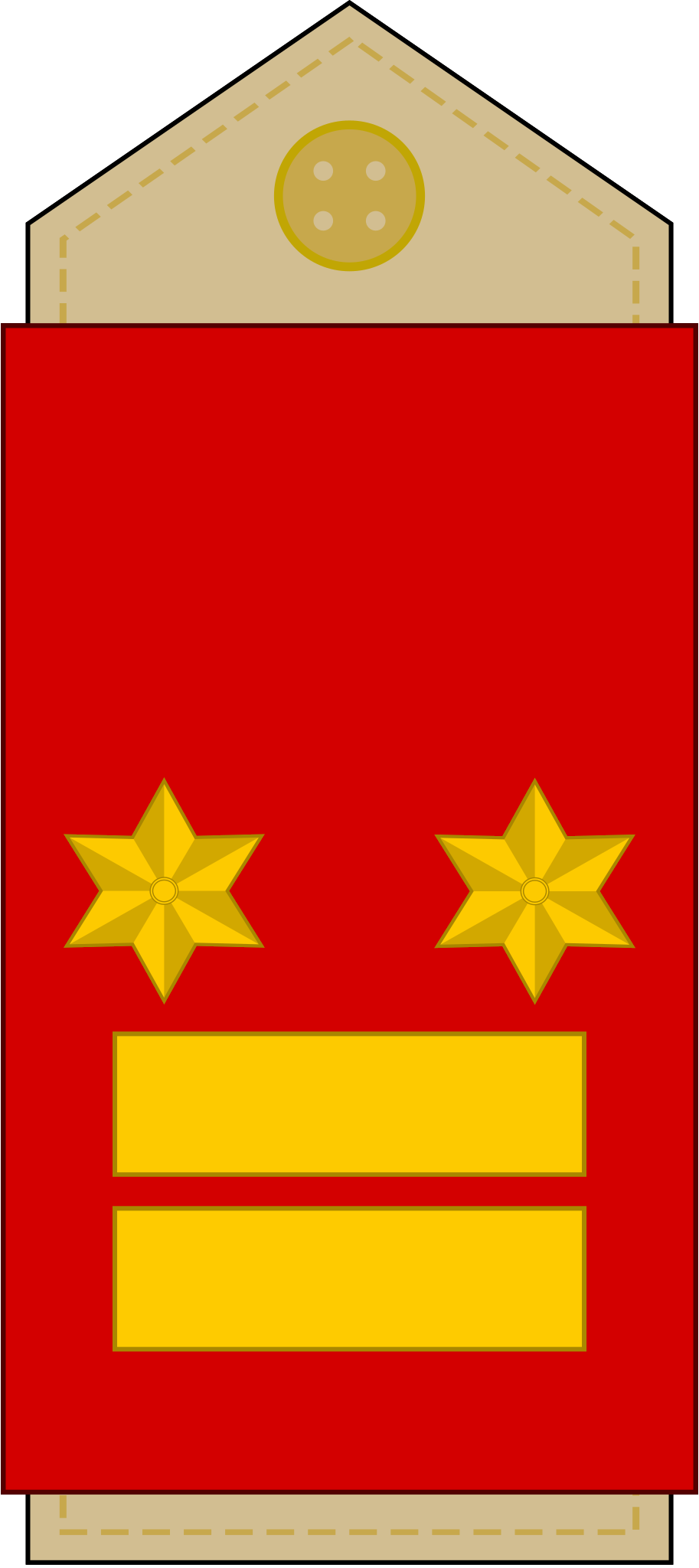
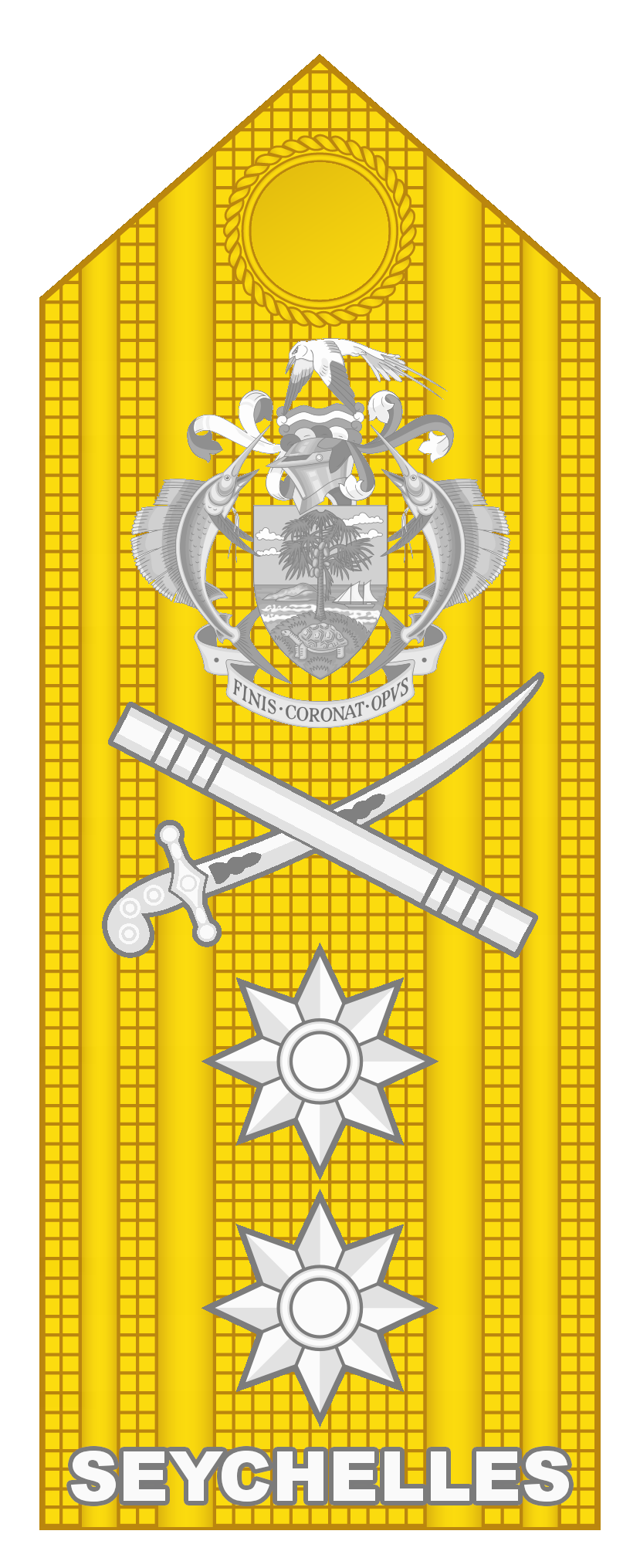
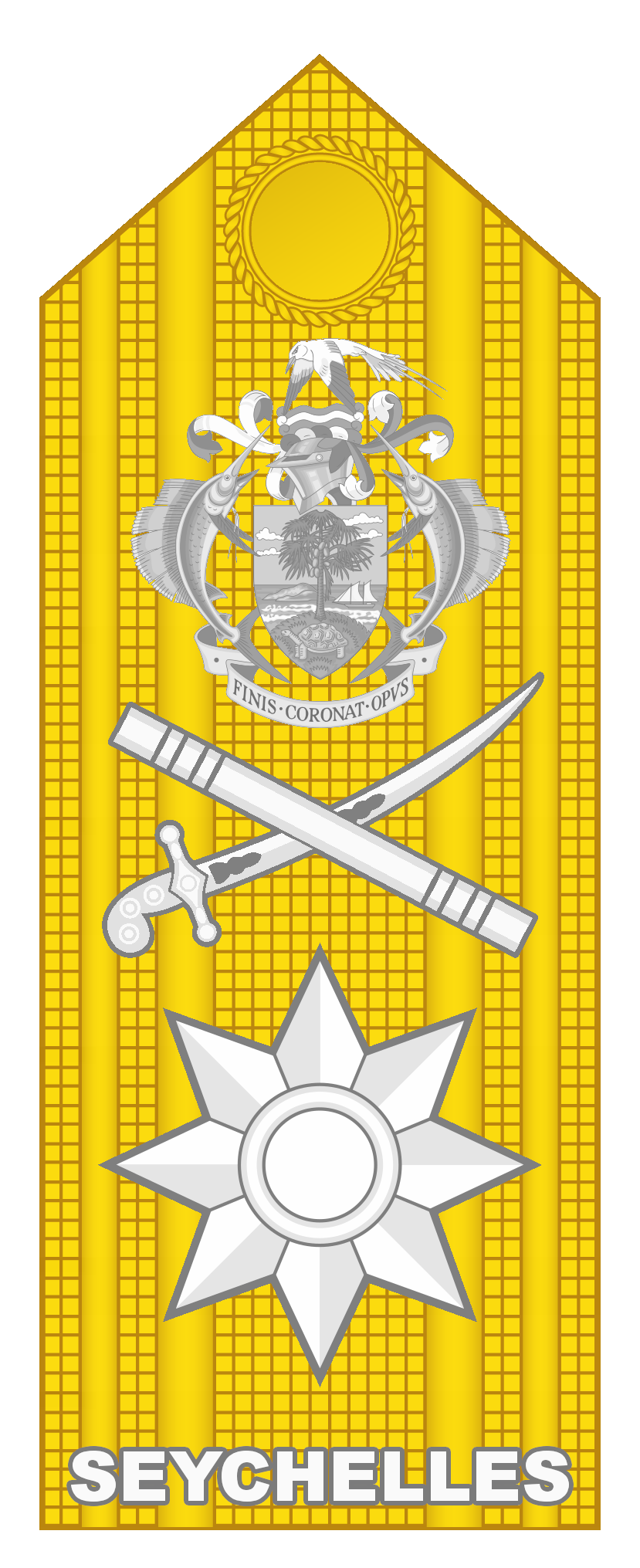
Rank group	General / flag officers					Senior officers					Junior officers
Belgian Land Component
Belgian Land Component		Generaal	Luitenant-generaal	Generaal-majoor	Brigadegeneraal	Kolonel		Luitenant-kolonel	Majoor	Kapitein-commandant	Kapitein	Luitenant		Onderluitenant
Belgian Land Component		Général	Lieutenant général	Général-major	Général de Brigade	Colonel		Lieutenant-colonel	Major	Capitaine-commandant	Capitaine	Lieutenant		Sous-lieutenant
Belgian Land Component		General	Generalleutnant	Generalmajor	Brigadegeneral	Oberst		Oberstleutnant	Major	Stabshauptmann	Hauptmann	Leutnant		Unterleutnant
Benin Army
Benin Army		Général d'armée	Général de corps d'armée	Général de division	Général de brigade	Colonel		Lieutenant-colonel	Commandant		Capitaine	Lieutenant		Sous-lieutenant
Burundi Army
Burundi Army		Général	Lieutenant-général	Général-major	Général de brigade	Colonel		Lieutenant-colonel	Major		Capitaine	Lieutenant		Sous-lieutenant
Burundi Army		Jenerai	Riyetena jenerai	Jenerai majoro	Jenerai wa birigade	Koroneri		Riyetena koroneri	Majoro		Kapitene	Riyetena		Suriyetena
Cameroon Ground Forces
Cameroon Ground Forces		Général d'armée	Général de corps	Général de division	Général de brigade	Colonel		Lieutenant-colonel	Commandant		Capitaine	Lieutenant		Sous-lieutenant
Canadian Army
Canadian Army		General	Lieutenant-general	Major-general	Brigadier-general	Colonel		Lieutenant-colonel	Major		Captain	Lieutenant		Second lieutenant
Canadian Army		Général(e)	Lieutenant(e)-général(e)	Major(e)-général(e)	Brigadier(ère)-général(e)	Colonel(le)		Lieutenant(e)-colonel(le)	Major(e)		Capitaine	Lieutenant(e)		Sous-lieutenant(e)
(Central African Republic) Central African Ground Forces
(Central African Republic) Central African Ground Forces		Général d'armée	Général de corps d'armée	Général de division	Général de brigade	Colonel		Lieutenant-colonel	Commandant		Capitaine	Lieutenant		Sous-Lieutenant
Chadian Ground Forces
Chadian Ground Forces	Maréchal	Général d'armée	Général de corps	Général de division	Général de brigade	Colonel		Lieutenant-Colonel	Commandant		Capitaine	Lieutenant		Sous-Lieutenant
Comorian Army
Comorian Army				Général de division	Général de brigade	Colonel		Lieutenant-colonel	Commandant		Capitaine	Lieutenant		Sous-Lieutenant
Land Forces of the DR Congo
Land Forces of the DR Congo		Général d'armée	Lieutenant-général	Général-major	Général de brigade	Colonel		Lieutenant-colonel	Major		Capitaine	Lieutenant		Sous-lieutenant
Congolese Ground Forces
Congolese Ground Forces		Général d'armée	Général de corps	Général de division	Général de brigade	Colonel		Lieutenant-Colonel	Commandant		Capitaine	Lieutenant		Sous-lieutenant
Djiboutian Army
Djiboutian Army				Général de division	Général de brigade	Colonel-major	Colonel	Lieutenant-colonel	Commandant		Capitaine	Lieutenant		Sous-lieutenant
Army of Equatorial Guinea
Army of Equatorial Guinea				General de division	General de brigada	Coronel		Teniente coronel	Comandante		Capitán	Teniente		Alférez
French Army
French Army	Maréchal de France	Général d'armée	Général de corps d'armée	Général de division	Général de brigade	Colonel		Lieutenant-colonel	Commandant		Capitaine	Lieutenant		Sous-lieutenant
Gabonese Army
Gabonese Army		Général d'armée	Général de corps d'armée	Général de division	Général de brigade	Colonel		Lieutenant-colonel	Commandant		Capitaine	Lieutenant		Sous-Lieutenant
Guinea Ground Forces
Guinea Ground Forces		Général d'armée	Général de corps d'armée	Général de division	Général de brigade	Colonel		Lieutenant-colonel	Commandant		Capitaine	Lieutenant		Sous-lieutenant
Haitian Army
Haitian Army			Lieutenant général	Major général	Général de brigade	Colonel		Lieutenant-colonel	Major		Capitaine	Lieutenant	Sous-lieutenant	Adjutant
Haitian Army			Lyetnan jeneral	Majò jeneral	Jeneral brigad	Kolonèl		Lyetnan kolonèl	Majò		Kapitèn	Lyetnan	Soulyetnan	Adjitan
Ivory Coast Ground Forces
Ivory Coast Ground Forces		Général d'armée	Général de corps d'armée	Général de division	Général de brigade	Colonel-major	Colonel	Lieutenant-colonel	Commandant		Capitaine	Lieutenant		Sous-lieutenant
Luxembourg Army
Luxembourg Army					Général	Colonel		Lieutenant-colonel	Major		Capitaine	Lieutenant en premier		Lieutenant
Madagascar Ground Forces
Madagascar Ground Forces		Général d'armée	Général de corps d'armée	Général de division	Général de brigade	Colonel		Lieutenant-colonel	Commandant		Capitaine	Lieutenant		Sous-lieutenant
Army of Monaco
Army of Monaco	Général en chef des armées					Colonel		Lieutenant-colonel	Commandant		Capitaine	Lieutenant		Sous-Lieutenant
Rwandan Land Forces
Rwandan Land Forces		General	Lieutenant general	Major general	Brigadier general	Colonel		Lieutenant colonel	Major		Captain	Lieutenant		Second lieutenant
Senegalese Army
Senegalese Army			Général de corps d'armée	Général de division	Général de brigade	Colonel		Lieutenant-colonel	Commandant		Capitaine	Lieutenant		Sous-lieutenant
Seychelles Army
Seychelles Army				Major general (Note: Introduced December 2024)	Brigadier general	Colonel		Lieutenant colonel	Major		Captain	Lieutenant		Second lieutenant
Swiss Army		General[1]	Corps General	Division General	Brigade General	Colonel		Lieutenant Colonel	Major		Captain	First Lieutenant		Lieutenant
Swiss Army		General	Korpskommandant	Divisionär	Brigadier	Oberst		Oberstleutnant	Major		Hauptmann	Oberleutnant		Leutnant
Swiss Army		Général	Commandant de corps	Divisionnaire	Brigadier	Colonel		Lieutenant-colonel	Major		Capitaine	Premier-lieutenant		Lieutenant
Togolese Army
Togolese Army				Général de division	Général de brigade	Colonel		Lieutenant-colonel	Commandant		Capitaine	Lieutenant		Sous-lieutenant
Vanuatu Mobile Forces
Vanuatu Mobile Forces				Major general Bigfala Jenerol	Brigadier	Colonel; Kolonel		Lieutenant colonel Lietnen Kolonel	Major; Bigfala		Captain; Kapten	First lieutenant Fas Lietnen		Second lieutenant Seken Lietnen
Rank group	General / flag officers					Senior officers					Junior officers
