= Comparative air force officer ranks of Francophone countries =

Rank comparison chart of officers for air forces of Francophone states.

== Officers ==
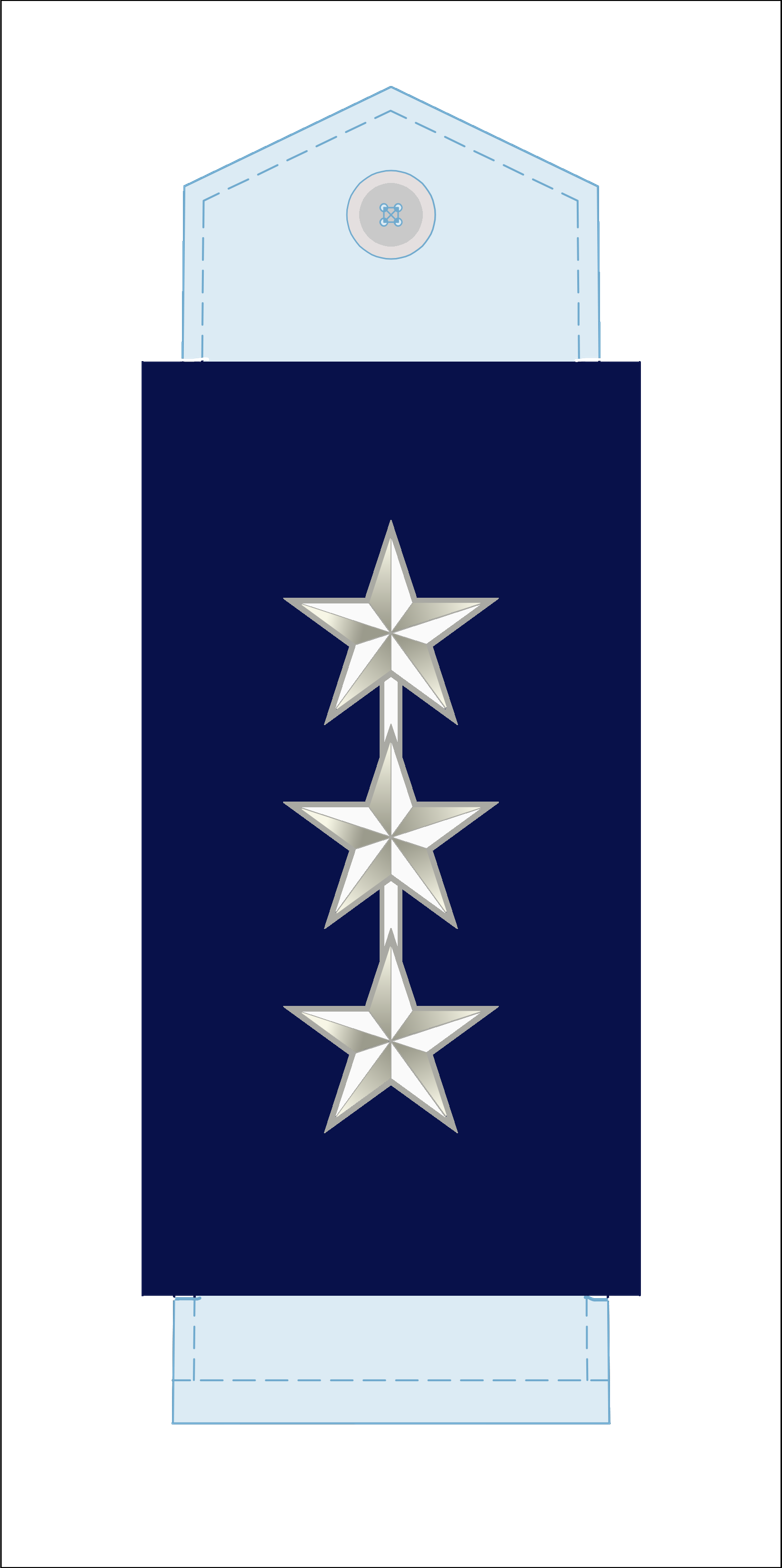
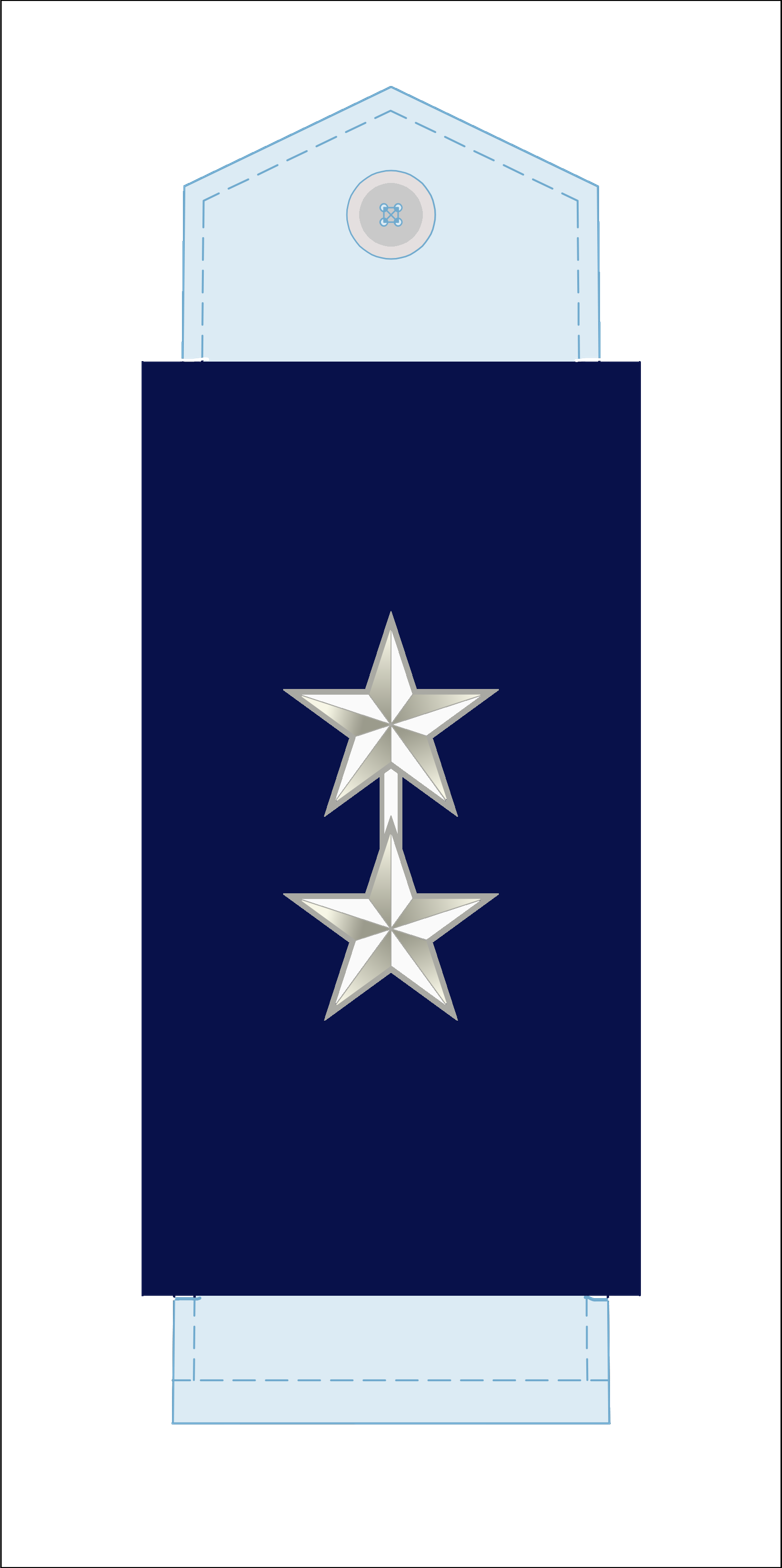
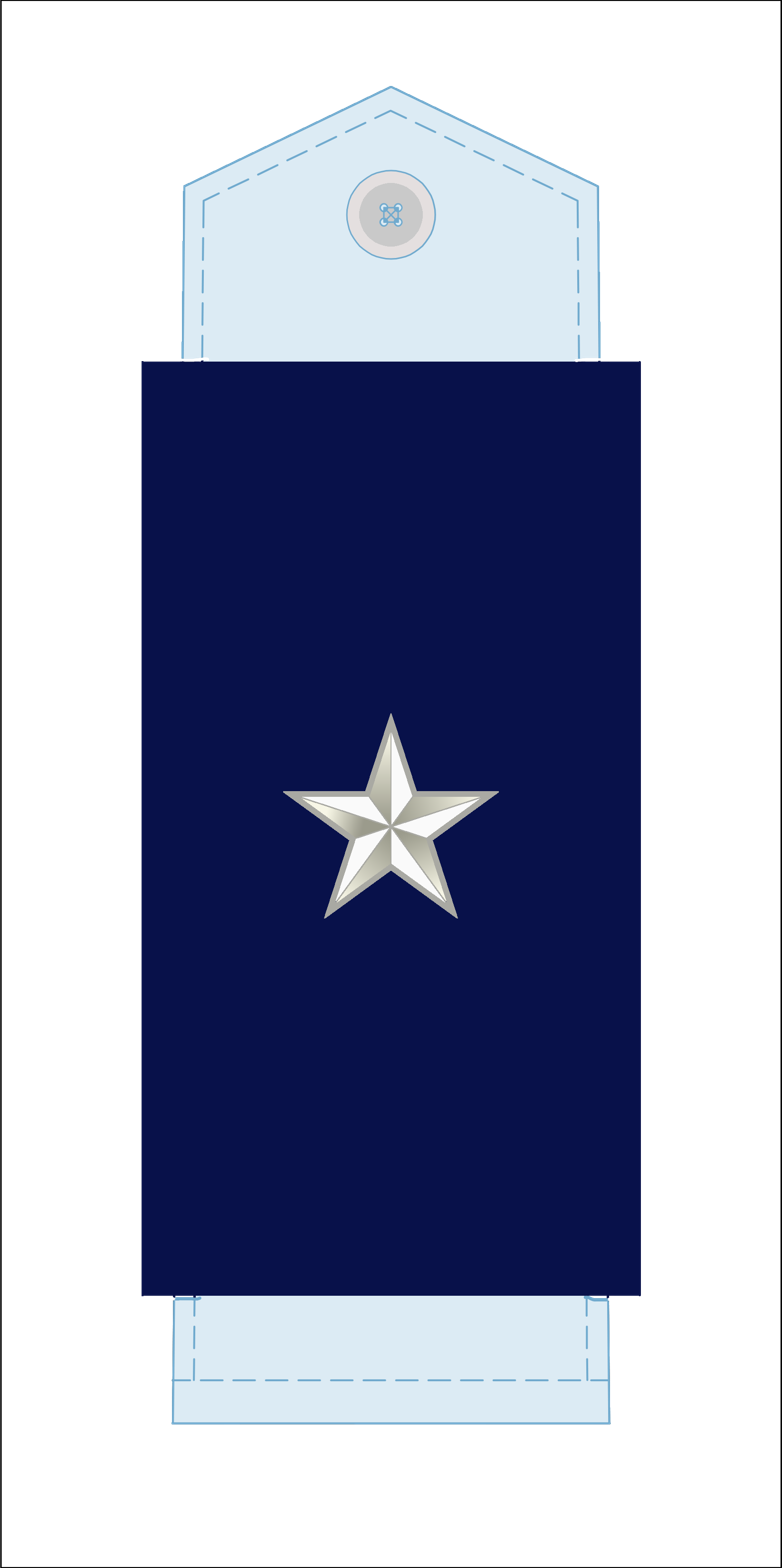
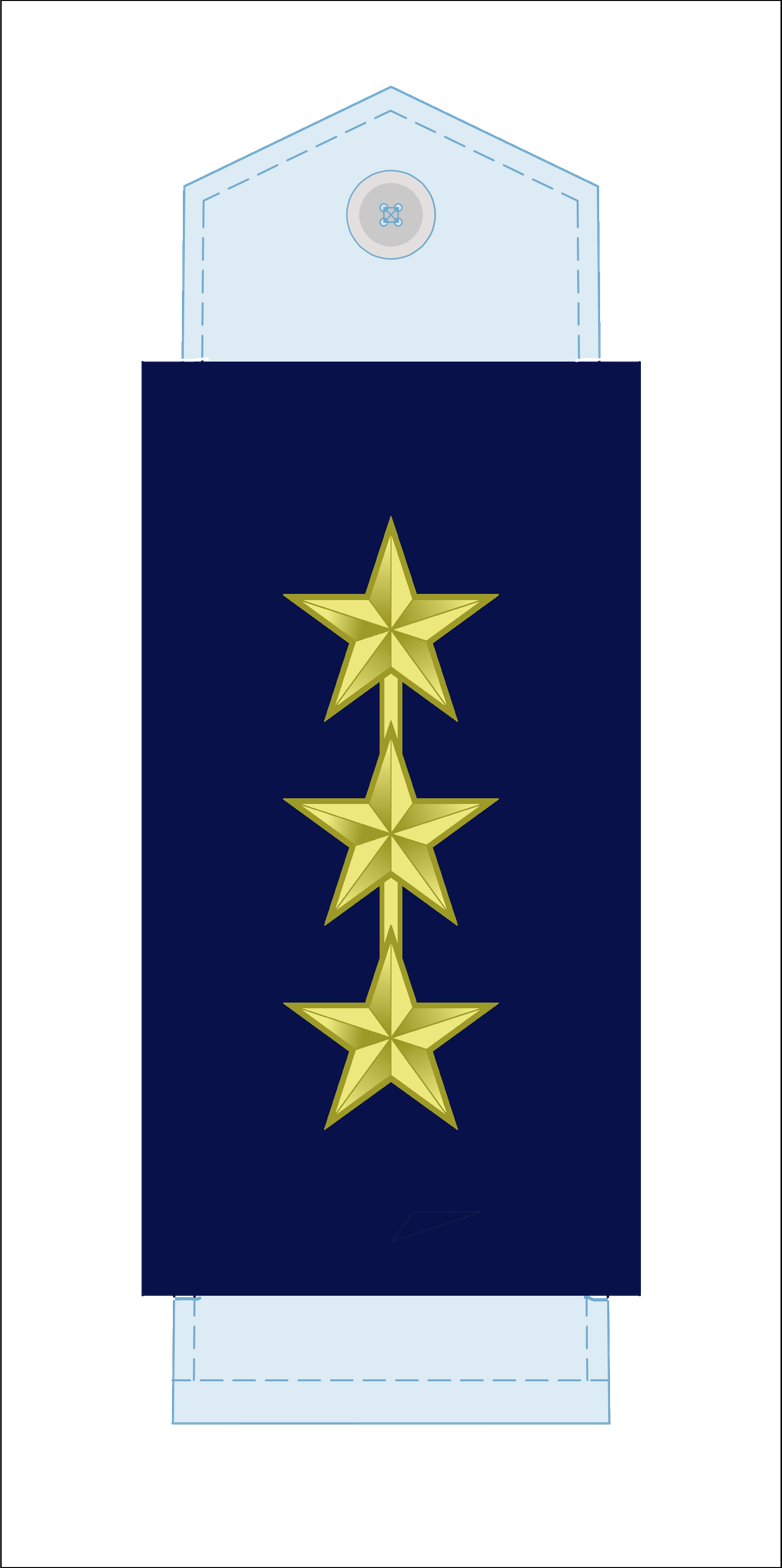
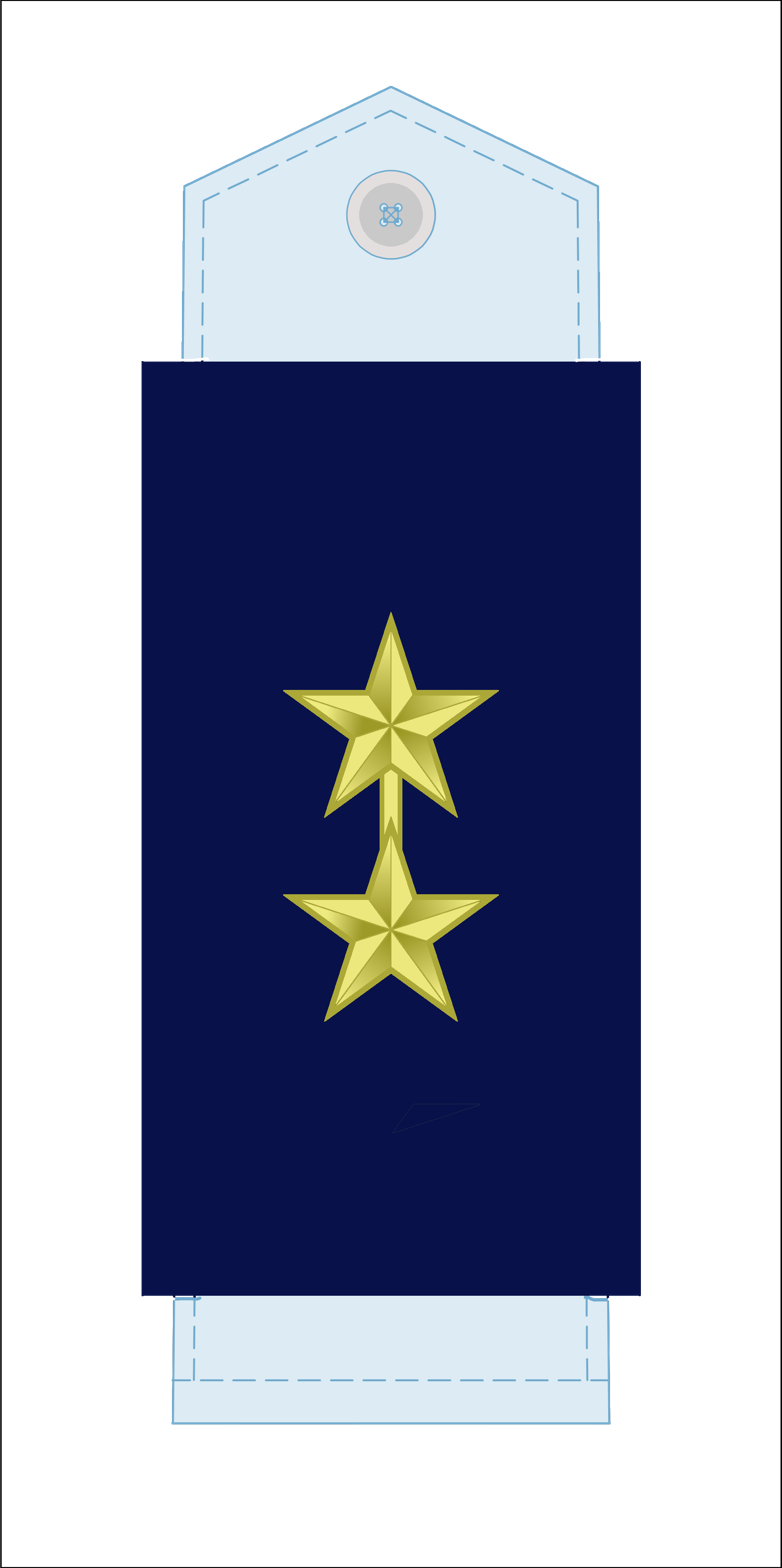
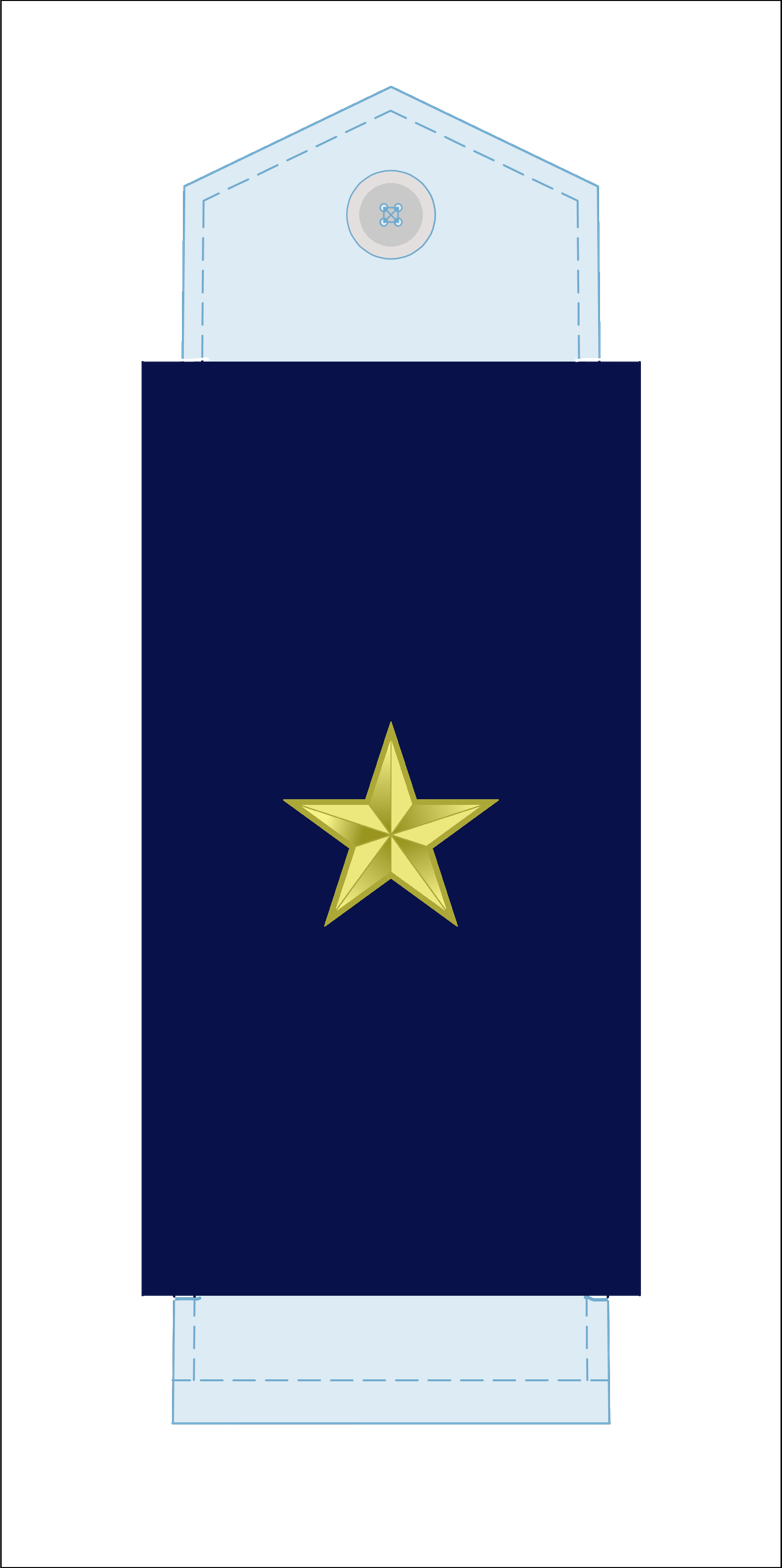
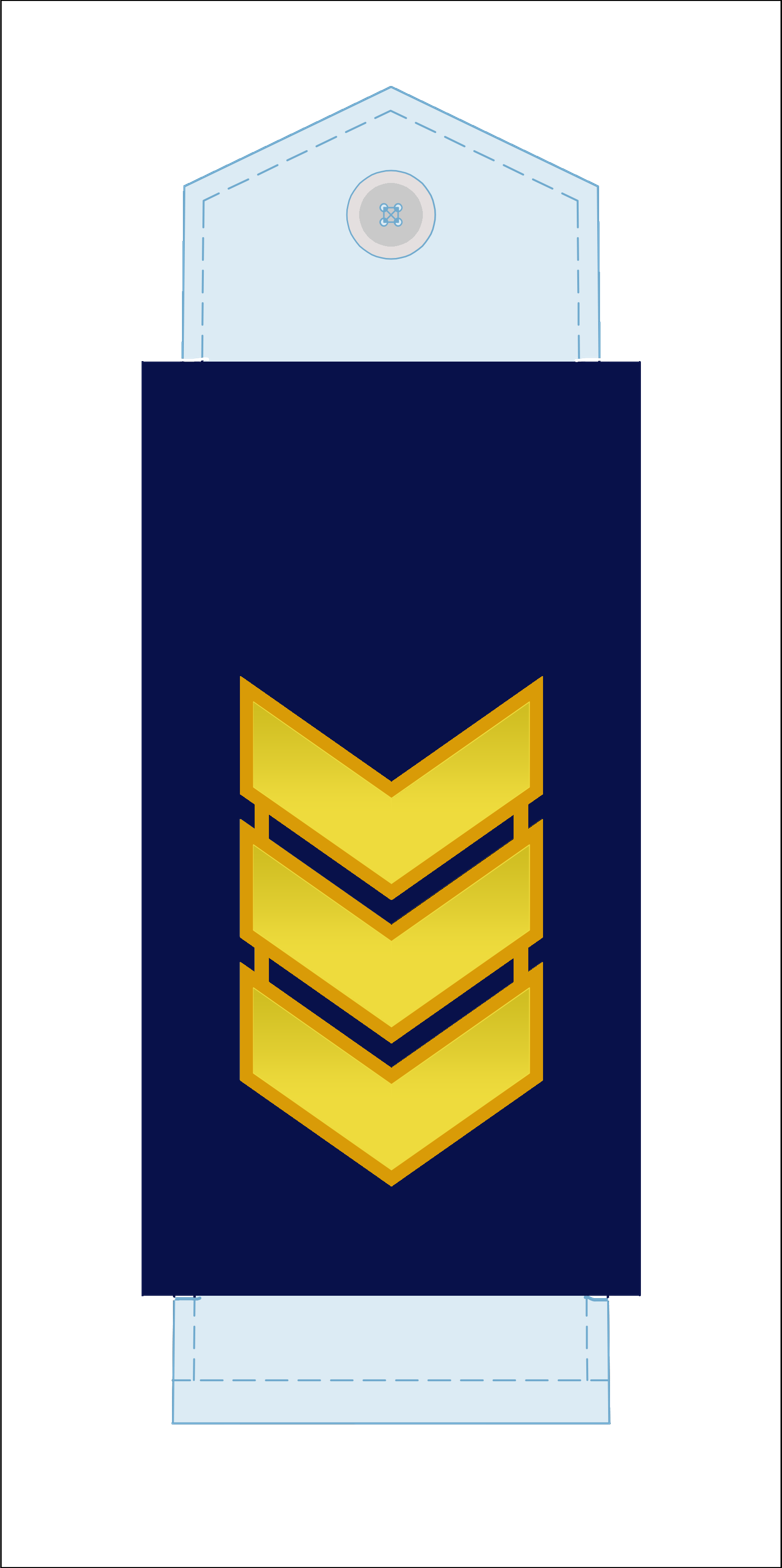
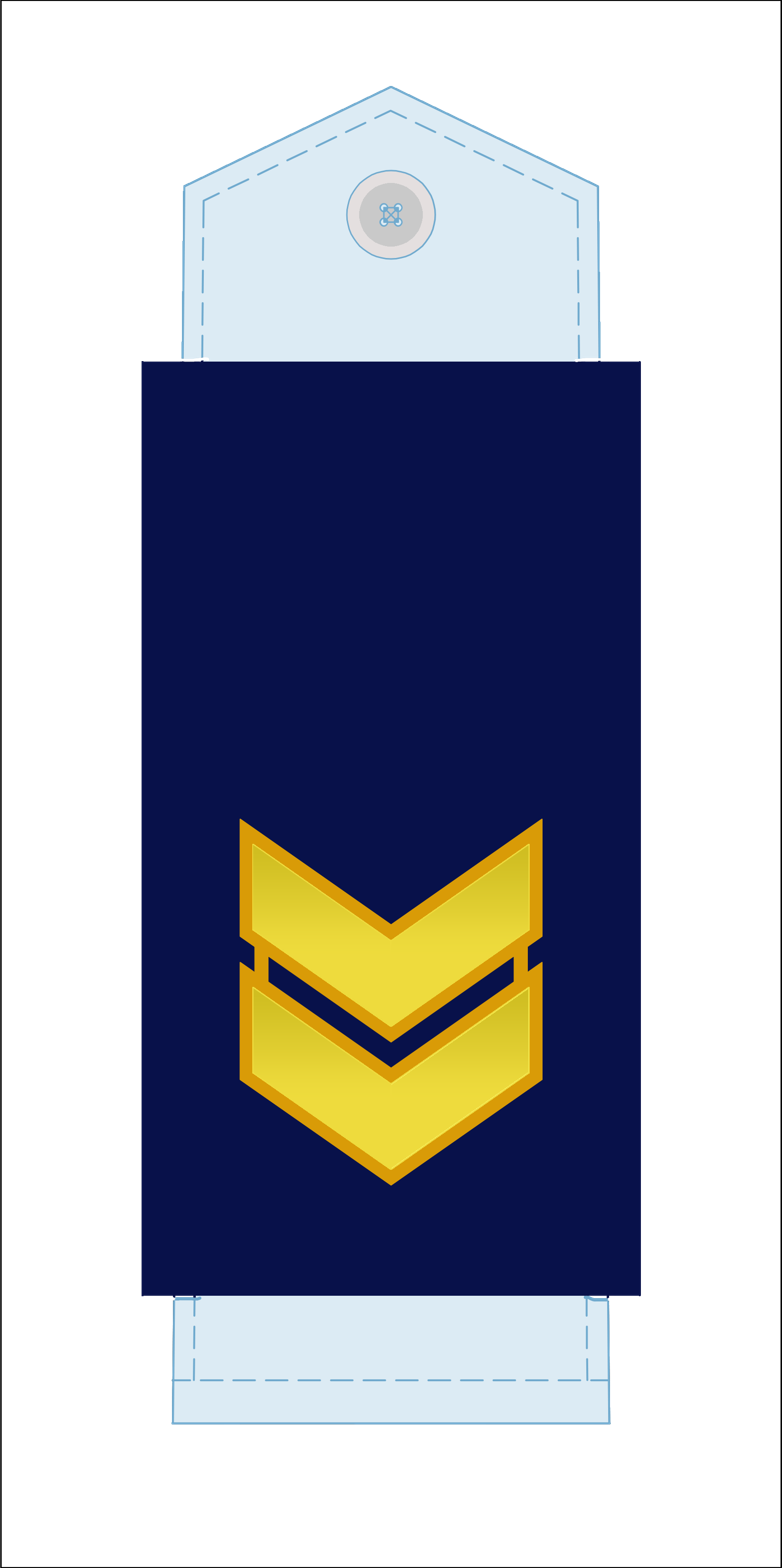
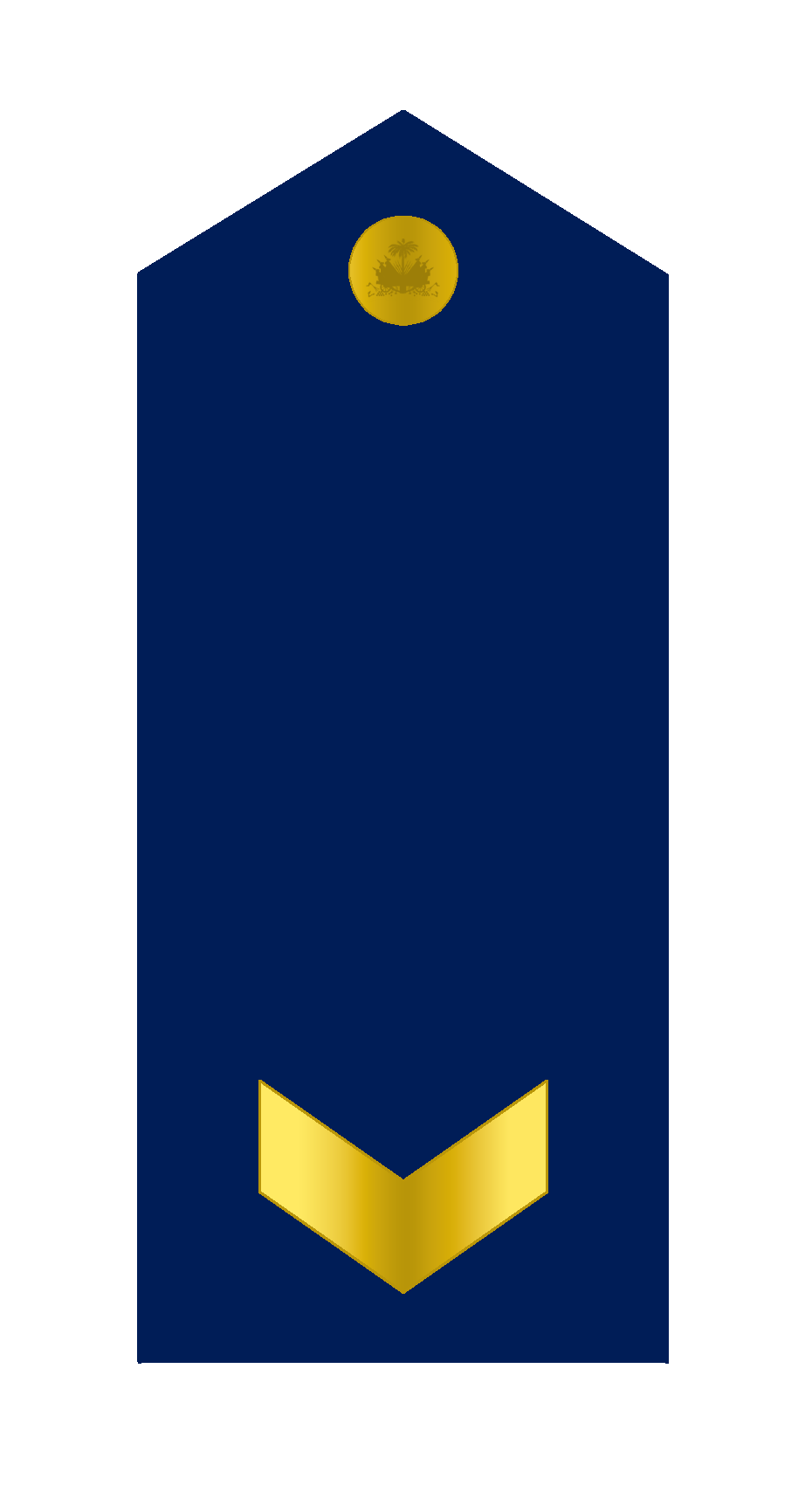
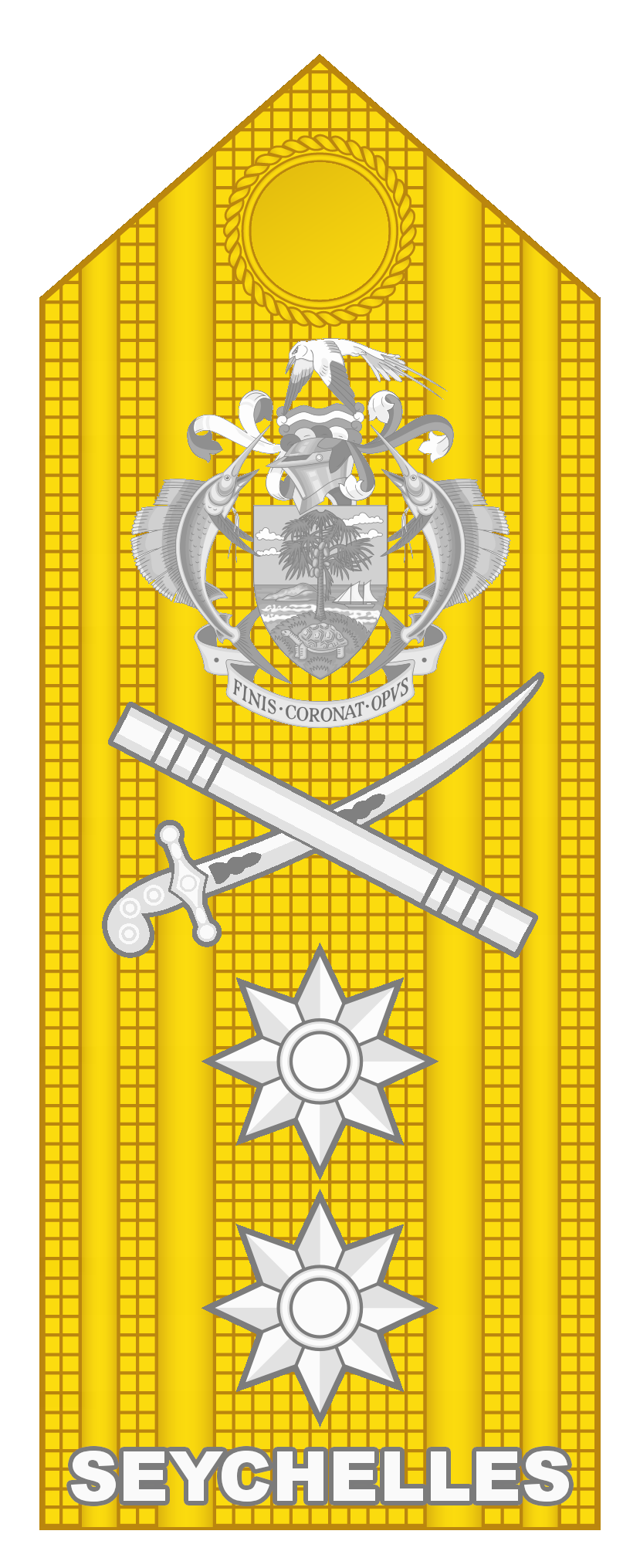
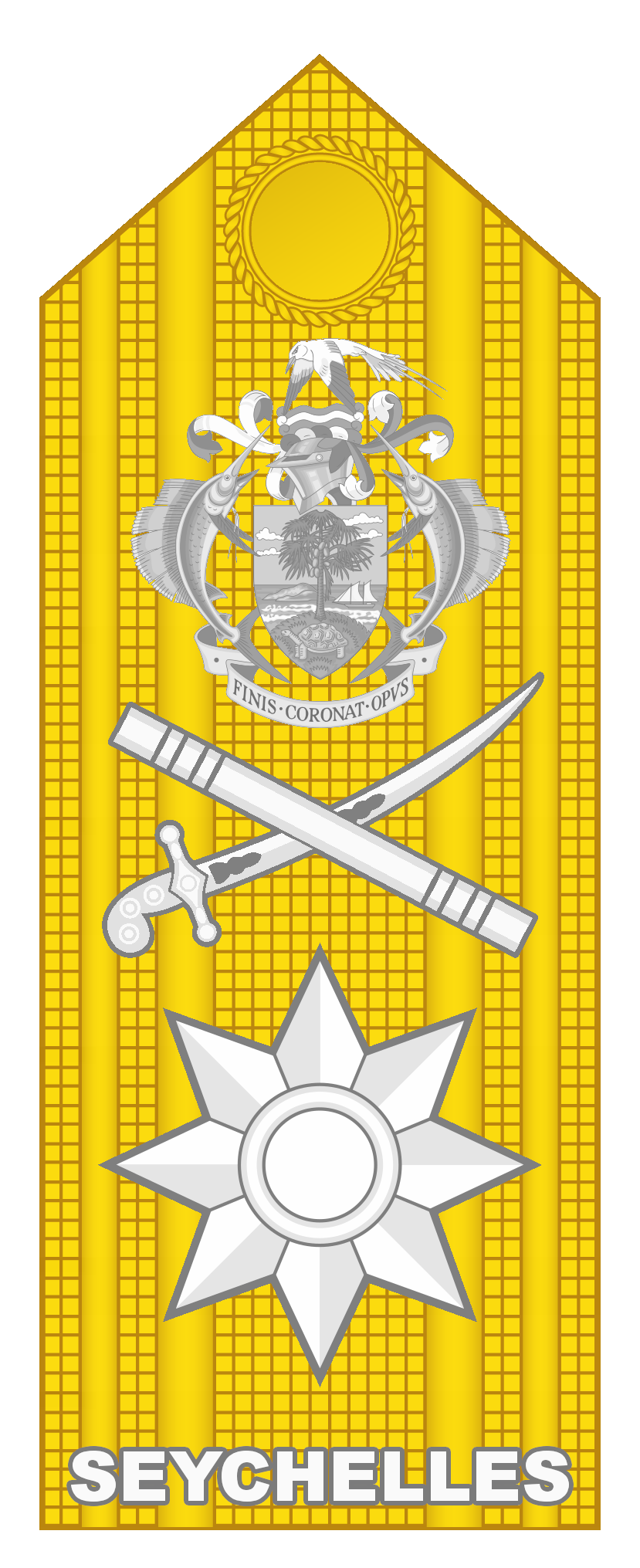
Rank group	General/Flag/Air officers				Senior officers					Junior officers
Belgian Air Component
Belgian Air Component	Generaal	Luitenant-generaal	Generaal-majoor	Brigadegeneraal	Kolonel		Luitenant-kolonel	Majoor	Kapitein-commandant	Kapitein	Luitenant	Onderluitenant
Belgian Air Component	Général	Lieutenant général	Général-major	Général de Brigade	Colonel		Lieutenant-colonel	Major	Capitaine-commandant	Capitaine	Lieutenant	Sous-lieutenant
Belgian Air Component	General	Generalleutnant	Generalmajor	Brigadegeneral	Oberst		Oberstleutnant	Major	Stabshauptmann	Hauptmann	Leutnant	Unterleutnant
Benin	No air force
Cameroon Air Force
Cameroon Air Force	Général d'armée aérienne	Général de corps aérien	Général de division aérienne	Général de brigade aérienne	Colonel		Lieutenant-Colonel	Commandant		Capitaine	Lieutenant	Sous-Lieutenant
Royal Canadian Air Force
Royal Canadian Air Force	General	Lieutenant-general	Major-general	Brigadier-general	Colonel		Lieutenant-colonel	Major		Captain	Lieutenant	Second lieutenant
Royal Canadian Air Force	Général(e)	Lieutenant(e)-général(e)	Major(e)-général(e)	Brigadier(ère)-général(e)	Colonel(le)		Lieutenant(e)-colonel(le)	Major(e)		Capitaine	Lieutenant(e)	Sous-lieutenant(e)
Comoros	No air force
Air Force of the DR Congo
Air Force of the DR Congo	Général d'armée	Lieutenant-général	Général-major	Général de brigade	Colonel		Lieutenant-colonel	Major		Capitaine	Lieutenant	Sous-Lieutenant
Congolese Air Force
Congolese Air Force	Général d'armée	Général de corps	Général de division	Général de brigade	Colonel		Lieutenant-Colonel	Commandant		Capitaine	Lieutenant	Sous-lieutenant
Djibouti Air Force
Djibouti Air Force				Général de brigade	Colonel-major	Colonel	Lieutenant-colonel	Commandant		Capitaine	Lieutenant	Sous-lieutenant
Equatorial Guinea Air Force
Equatorial Guinea Air Force			General de division	General de brigada	Coronel		Teniente coronel	Comandante		Capitán	Teniente	Alférez
French Air and Space Force
French Air and Space Force	Général d´armée aérienne	Général de corps aérien	Général de division aérienne	Général de brigade aérienne	Colonel		Lieutenant-colonel	Commandant		Capitaine	Lieutenant	Sous-lieutenant
Gabonese Air Force
Gabonese Air Force	Général d'armée	Général de corps d'armée	Général de division	Général de brigade	Colonel		Lieutenant-colonel	Commandant		Capitaine	Lieutenant	Sous-Lieutenant
Guinea Air Force
Guinea Air Force	Général d'armée	Général de corps d'armée	Général de division	Général de brigade	Colonel		Lieutenant-colonel	Commandant		Capitaine	Lieutenant	Sous-lieutenant
Haitian Aviation Corps
Haitian Aviation Corps		Lieutenant général	Major général	Général de brigade	Colonel		Lieutenant-colonel	Major		Capitaine	Lieutenant	Sous-lieutenant
Haitian Aviation Corps		Lyetnan jeneral	Majò jeneral	Jeneral brigad	Kolonèl		Lyetnan kolonèl	Majò		Kapitèn	Lyetnan	Soulyetnan
Ivory Coast Air Force
Ivory Coast Air Force	Général d'armée	Général de corps d'armée	Général de division	Général de brigade	Colonel-major	Colonel	Lieutenant-colonel	Commandant		Capitaine	Lieutenant	Sous-lieutenant
Madagascar Air Force
Madagascar Air Force	Général d'armée	Général de corps d'armée	Général de division	Général de brigade	Colonel		Lieutenant-colonel	Commandant		Capitaine	Lieutenant	Sous-lieutenant
Monaco	No air force
Senegalese Air Force
Senegalese Air Force			Général de division	Général de brigade	Colonel		Lieutenant-colonel	Commandant		Capitaine	Lieutenant	Sous-lieutenant
Seychelles Air Force
Seychelles Air Force			Major general (Note: Introduced December 2024)	Brigadier general	Colonel		Lieutenant colonel	Major		Captain	Lieutenant	Second lieutenant
(Togo) Togolese Air Force
(Togo) Togolese Air Force			Général de division aérienne	Général de brigade aérienne	Colonel-major	Colonel	Lieutenant-colonel	Commandant		Capitaine	Lieutenant	Sous-lieutenant
Vanuatu	No air force
Rank group	General/Flag/Air officers				Senior officers					Junior officers
