= Comparative army officer ranks of Hispanophone countries =

Rank comparison chart of officers for armies/land forces of Hispanophone states.

== Officers ==
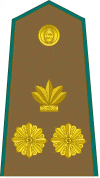
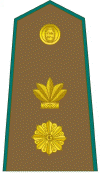
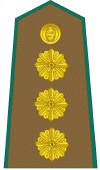
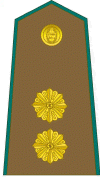
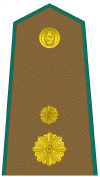
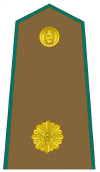
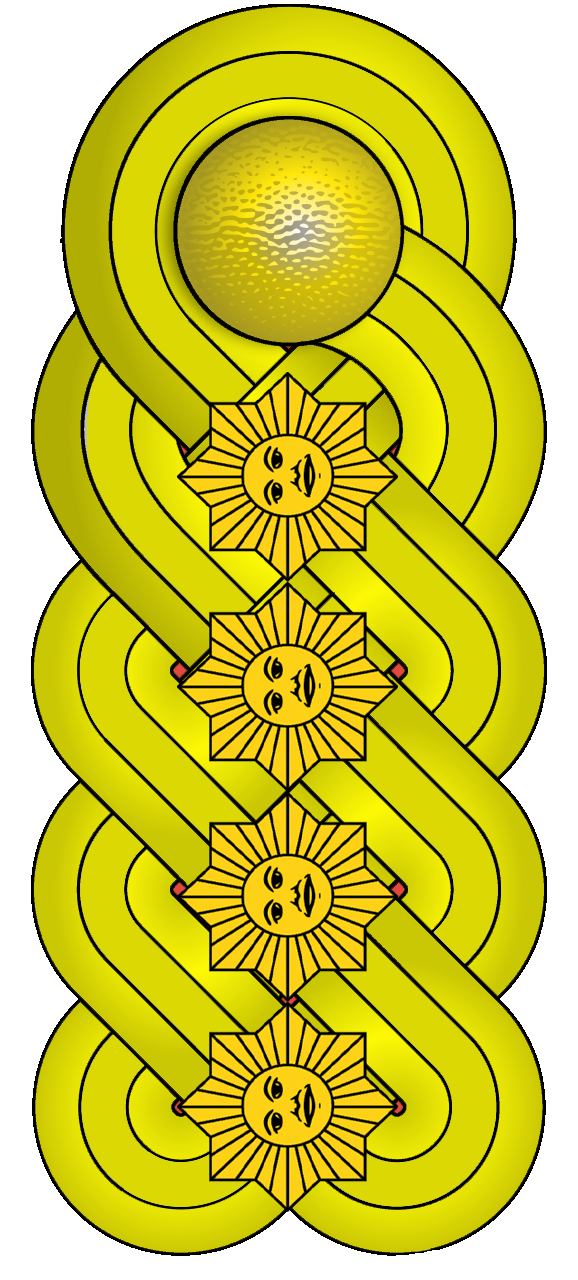
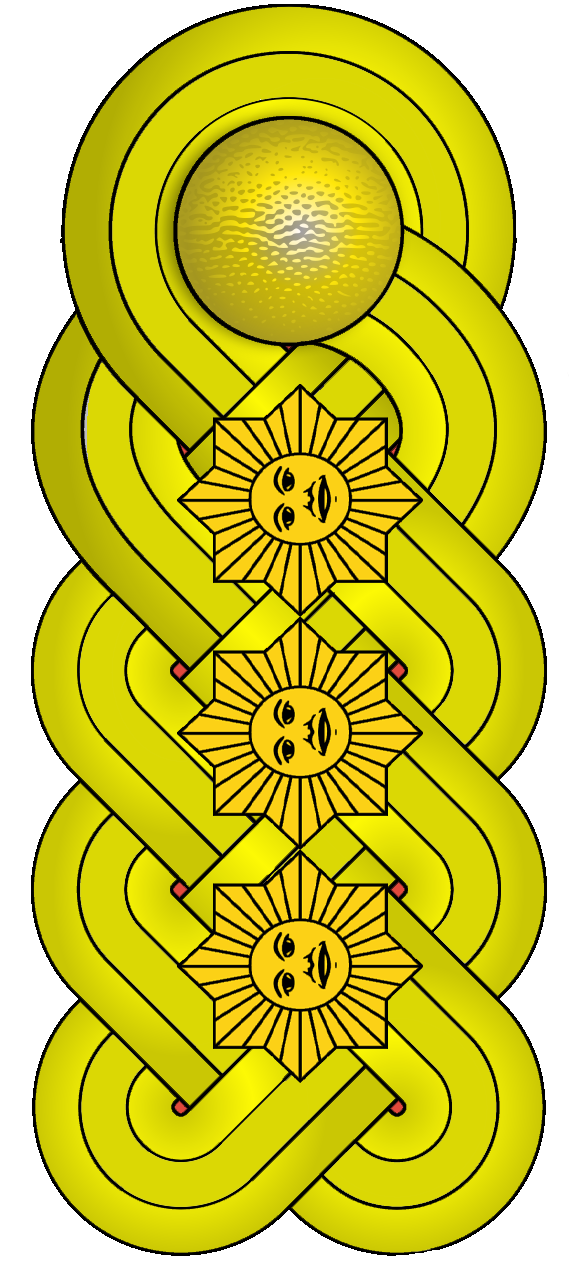
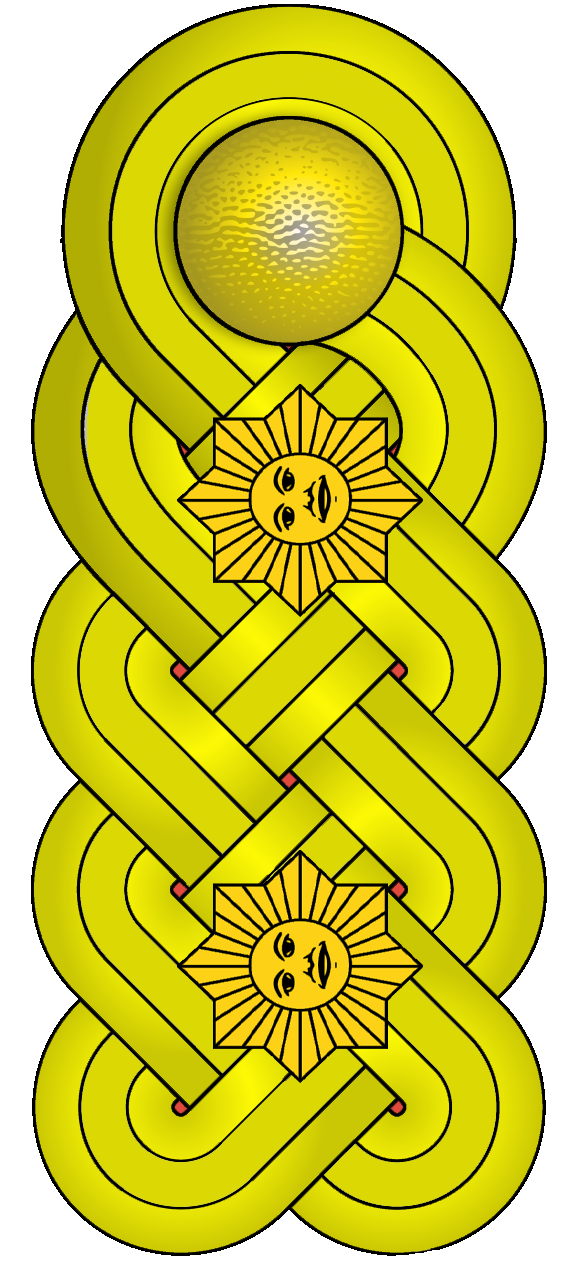
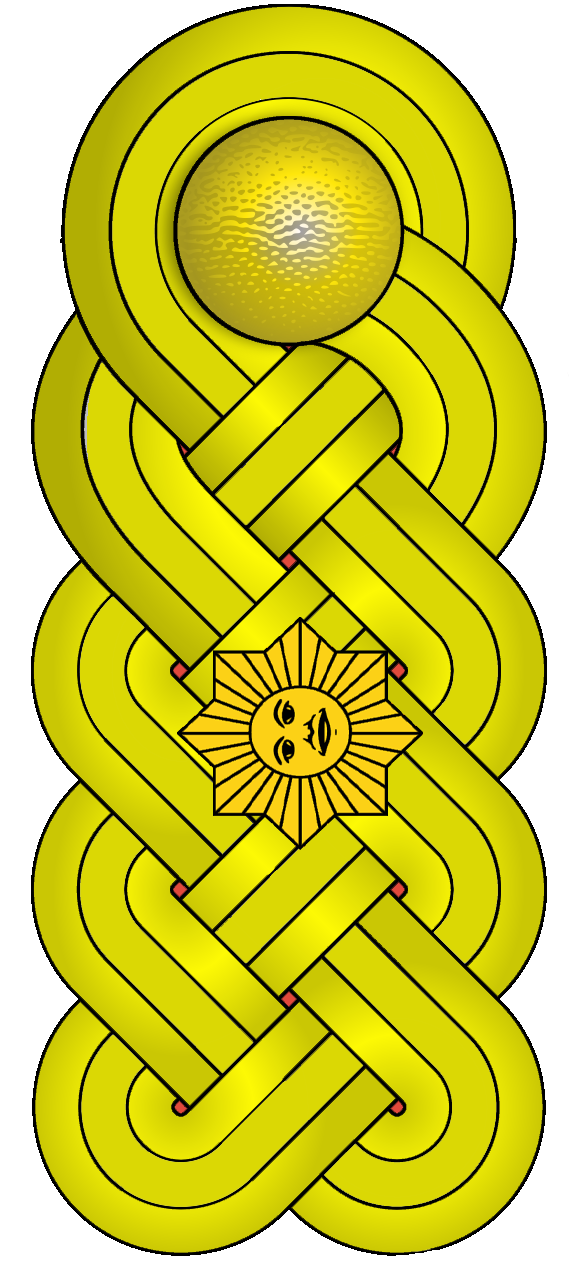
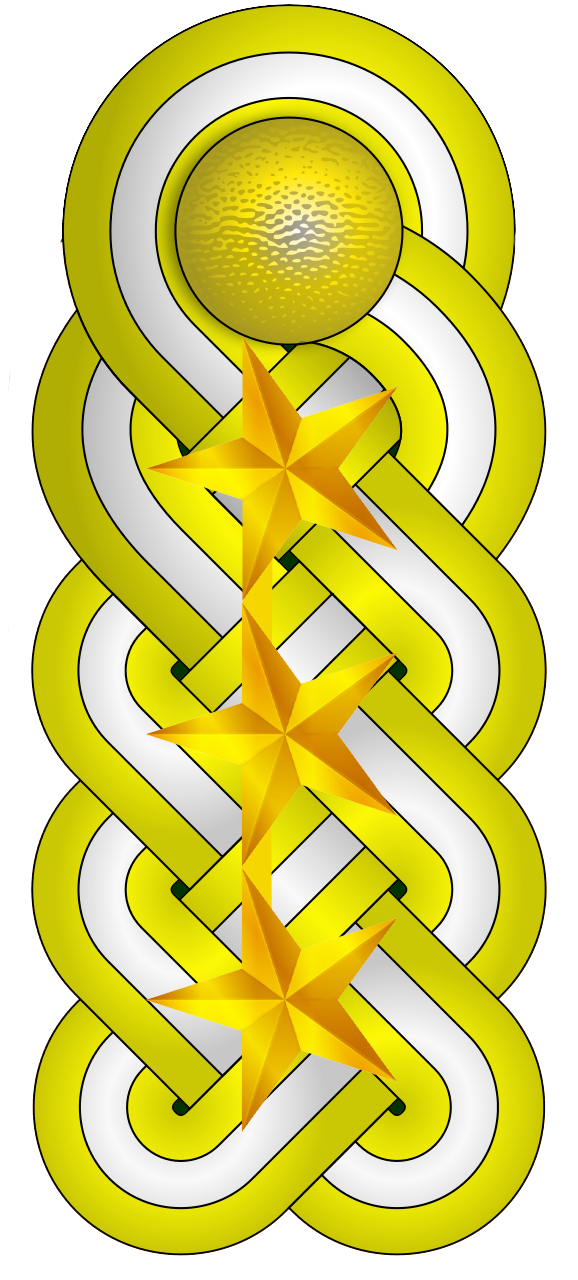
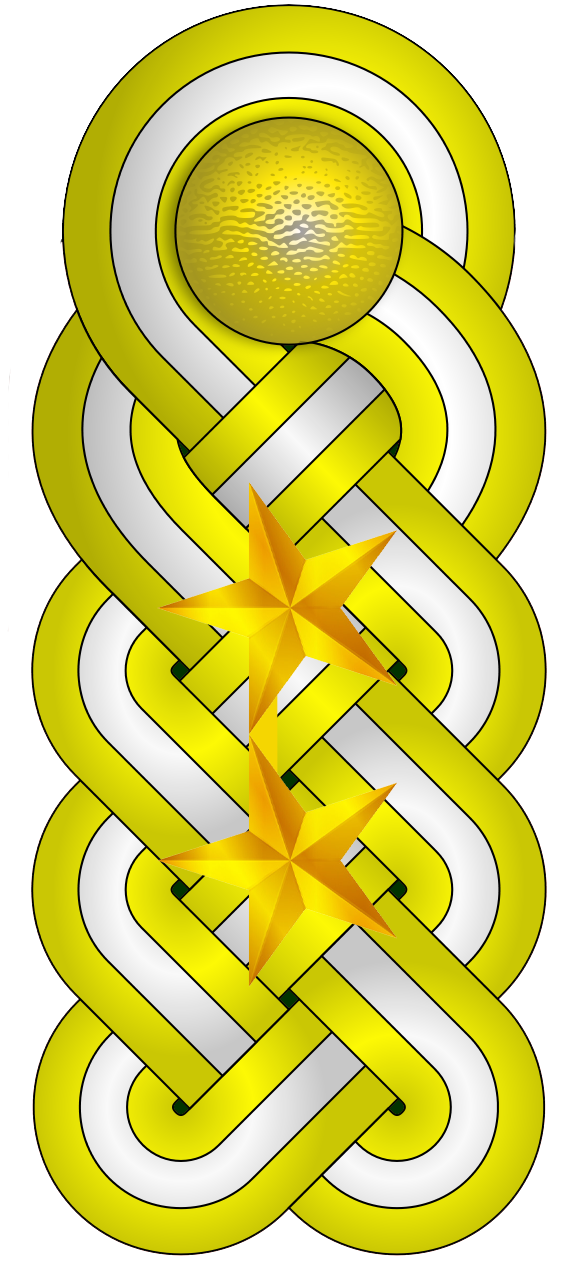
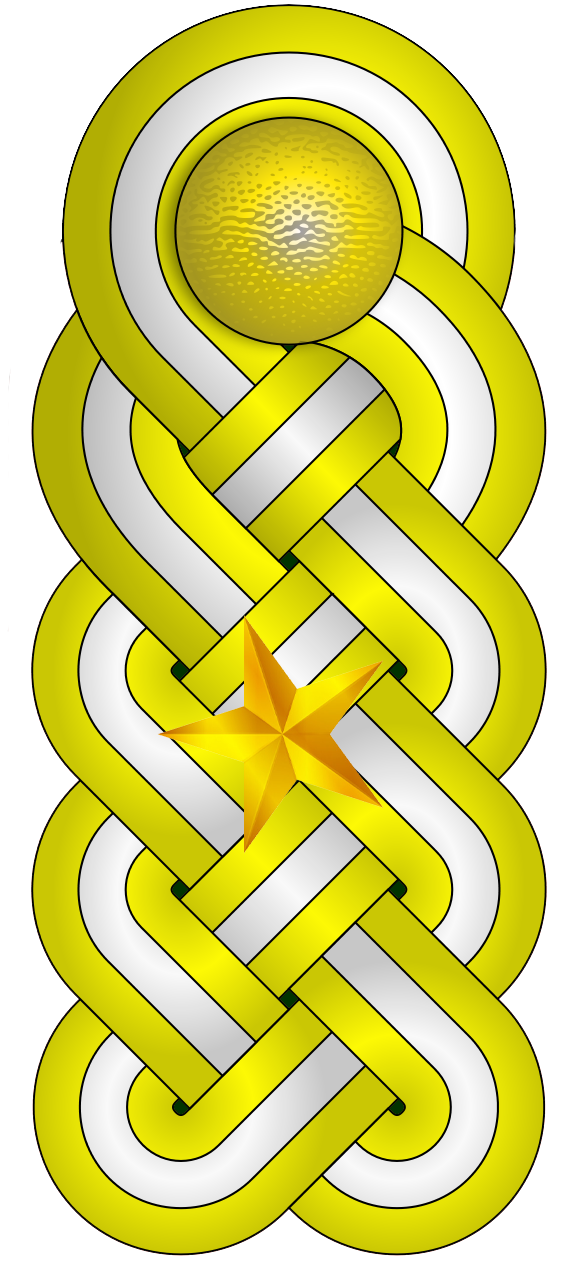
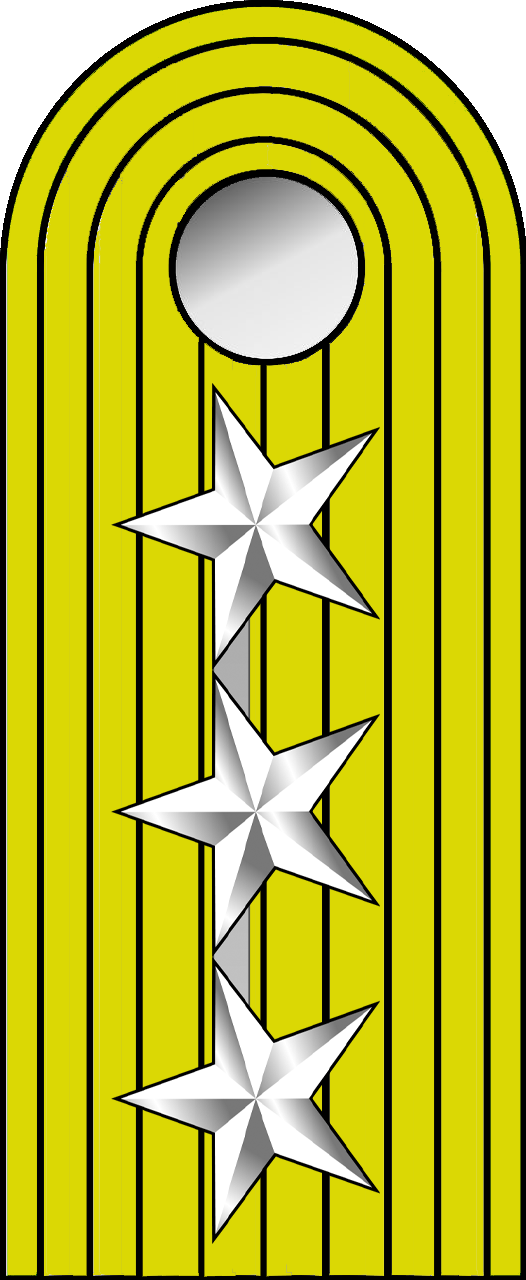
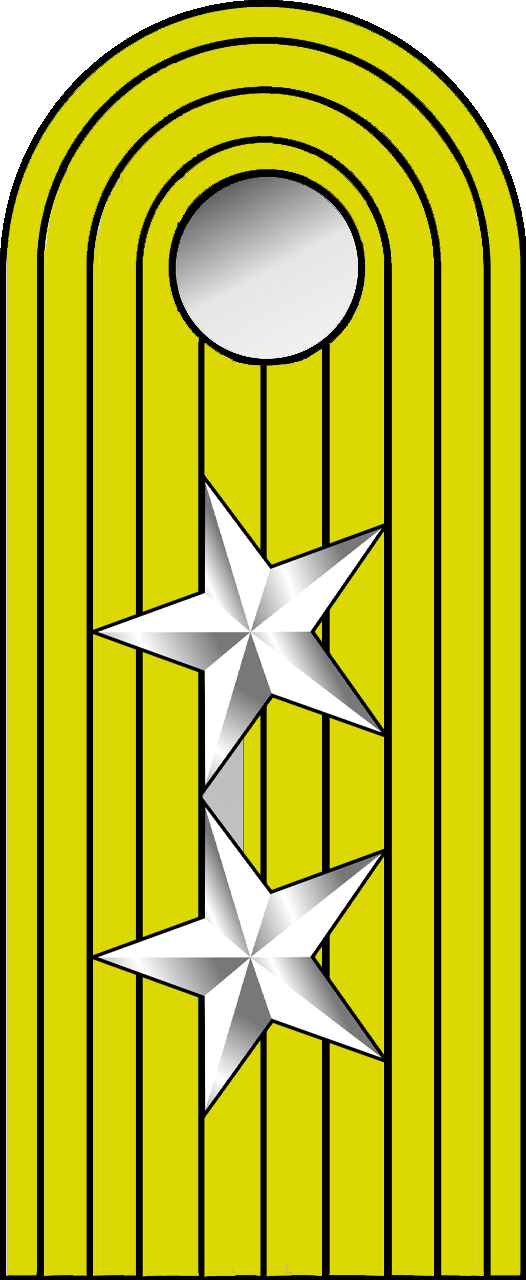
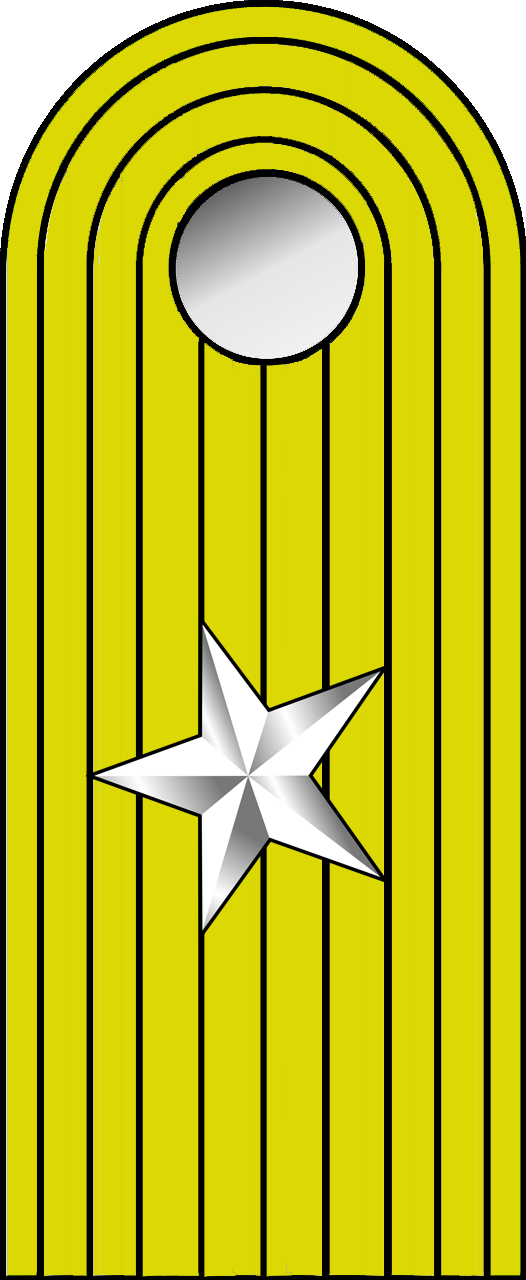
Rank group	General / flag officers					Senior officers				Junior officers
Argentine Army
Argentine Army		Teniente general	General de división	General de brigada	Coronel mayor	Coronel		Teniente coronel	Mayor	Capitán		Teniente primero	Teniente	Subteniente
Bolivian Army
Bolivian Army		General de ejército	General de división	General de brigada		Coronel		Teniente coronel	Mayor	Captáin		Teniente		Subteniente
Chilean Army
Chilean Army		General de ejército	General de división	General de brigada	Brigadier	Coronel		Teniente coronel	Mayor	Capitán		Teniente	Subteniente	Alférez
Colombian National Army
Colombian National Army		General de ejército		Mayor general	Brigadier general	Coronel		Teniente coronel	Mayor	Capitán		Teniente		Subteniente
Costa Rica	No army
Cuban Revolutionary Army
Cuban Revolutionary Army		General de ejército	General de cuerpo de ejército	General de división	General de brigada	Primer coronel	Coronel	Teniente coronel	Mayor	Capitán		Primer teniente	Teniente	Subteniente
Dominican Army
Dominican Army			Teniente general	Mayor general	General de brigada	Coronel		Teniente coronel	Mayor	Capitán		Primer teniente		Segundo teniente
Ecuadorian Army
Ecuadorian Army		General de ejército	General de división	General de brigada		Coronel		Teniente coronel	Mayor	Capitán		Teniente		Subteniente
Salvadoran Army
Salvadoran Army		General de ejército	General de división	General de brigada	Brigadier	Coronel		Teniente coronel	Mayor	Capitán		Teniente		Subteniente
Army of Equatorial Guinea
Army of Equatorial Guinea				General de division	General de brigada	Coronel		Teniente coronel	Comandante	Capitán		Teniente		Alférez
Guatemalan Army
Guatemalan Army				General de división	General de brigada	Coronel		Teniente coronel	Mayor	Capitán primero	Capitán segundo	Teniente		Subteniente
Honduran Army
Honduran Army				General de división	General de brigada	Coronel		Teniente coronel	Mayor	Capitán		Teniente		Subteniente
Mexican Army
Mexican Army		Secretario de la defensa nacional	General de división	General de brigada	General brigadier	Coronel		Teniente coronel	Mayor	Capitan primero	Capitán segundo	Teniente		Subteniente
Nicaraguan Army
Nicaraguan Army		General de ejército	Coronel general	Mayor general	General de brigada	Coronel		Teniente coronel	Mayor	Capitán		Teniente primero		Teniente
Panama	No army
Paraguayan Army
Paraguayan Army		General de ejército	General de división	General de brigada		Coronel		Teniente coronel	Mayor	Capitán		Teniente primero	Teniente	Subteniente
Peruvian Army
Peruvian Army	Gran Mariscal del Perú	General de ejército	General de división	General de brigada		Coronel		Teniente coronel	Mayor	Capitán		Teniente		Subteniente
Spanish Army
Spanish Army	Capitán general	General de ejército	Teniente general	General de división	General de brigada	Coronel		Teniente coronel	Comandante	Capitán		Teniente		Alférez
National Army of Uruguay
National Army of Uruguay		General de ejército		General		Coronel		Teniente coronel	Mayor	Capitán		Teniente primero	Teniente segundo	Alférez
Venezuelan Army
Venezuelan Army		General en jefe	Mayor general	General de division	General de brigada	Coronel		Teniente coronel	Mayor	Capitán		Primer teniente		Teniente
Rank group	General / flag officers					Senior officers				Junior officers

== Warrant officers (WO5–W01) ==
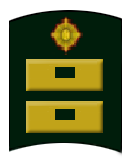
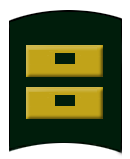
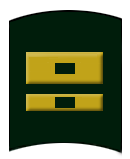
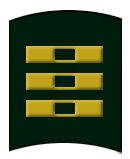
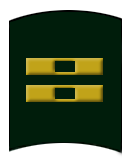
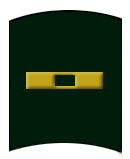
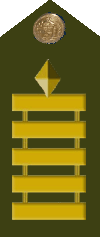
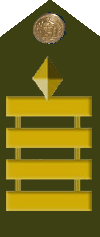
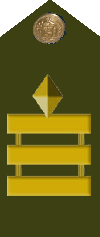
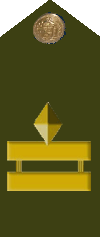
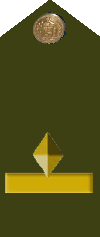
Equivalent NATO rank	WO-5	WO-4		WO-3	WO-2	WO-1
Peruvian Army
Peruvian Army	Técnico superior general del ejército	Técnico jefe superior	Técnico jefe	Técnico primero	Técnico segundo	Técnico tercero
Venezuelan Army
Venezuelan Army	Maestro técnico supervisor	Maestro técnico mayor		Maestro técnico de primera	Maestro técnico de segunda	Maestro técnico de tercera	Equivalent NATO rank	WO-5	WO-4	WO-3	WO-2	WO-1

== See also ==
- Comparative army officer ranks of the Americas
- Ranks and insignia of NATO armies officers
