= Military ranks of the Comoros =

The Military ranks of Comoros are the military insignia used by the Comorian Armed Forces. Comoros has neither a navy nor an air force, with France providing protection of territorial waters and air surveillance.

== Commissioned officer ranks ==
The rank insignia of commissioned officers.

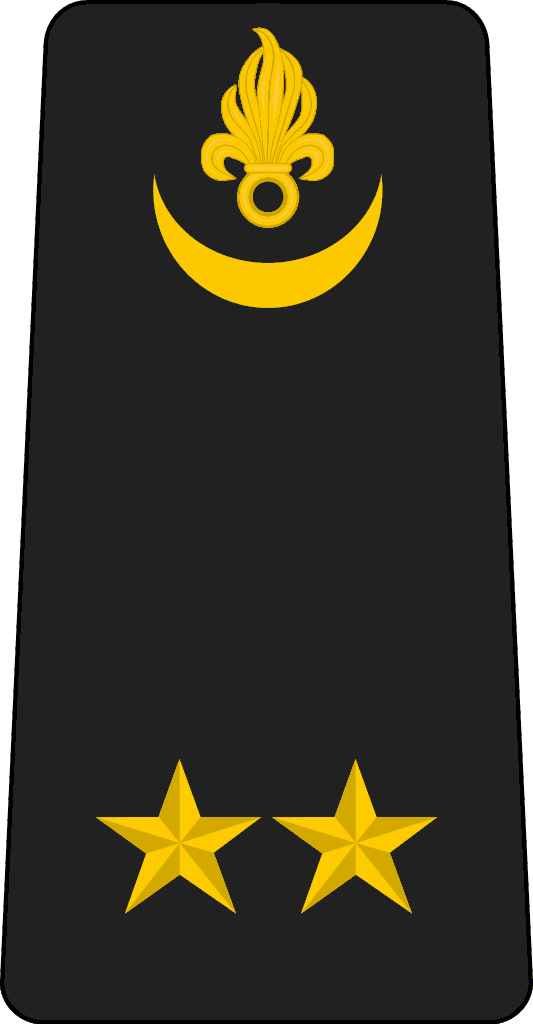
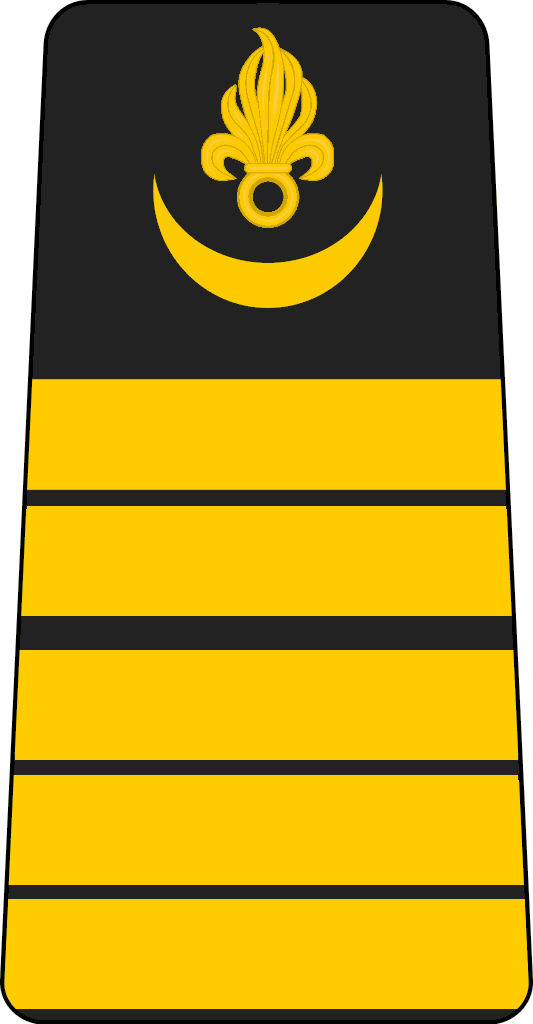
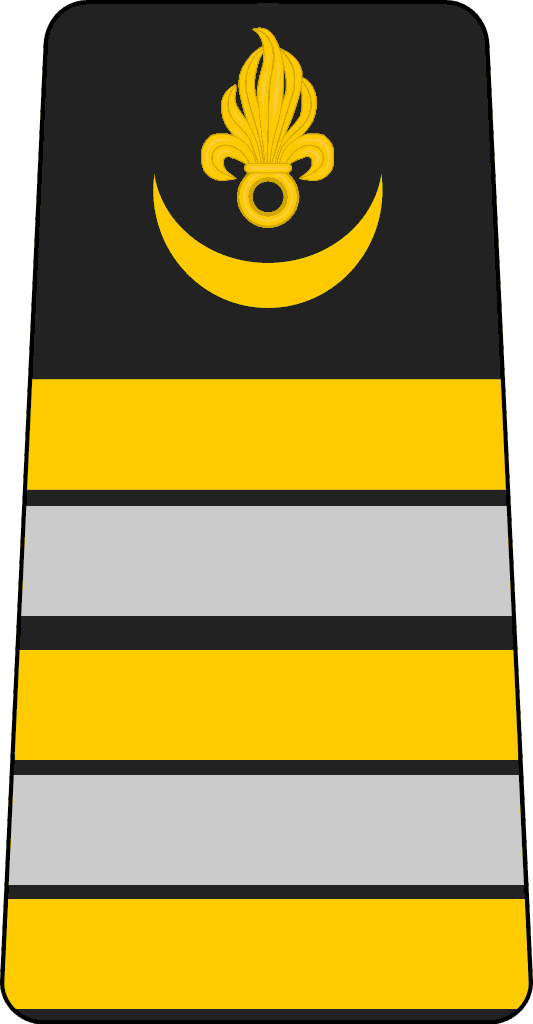
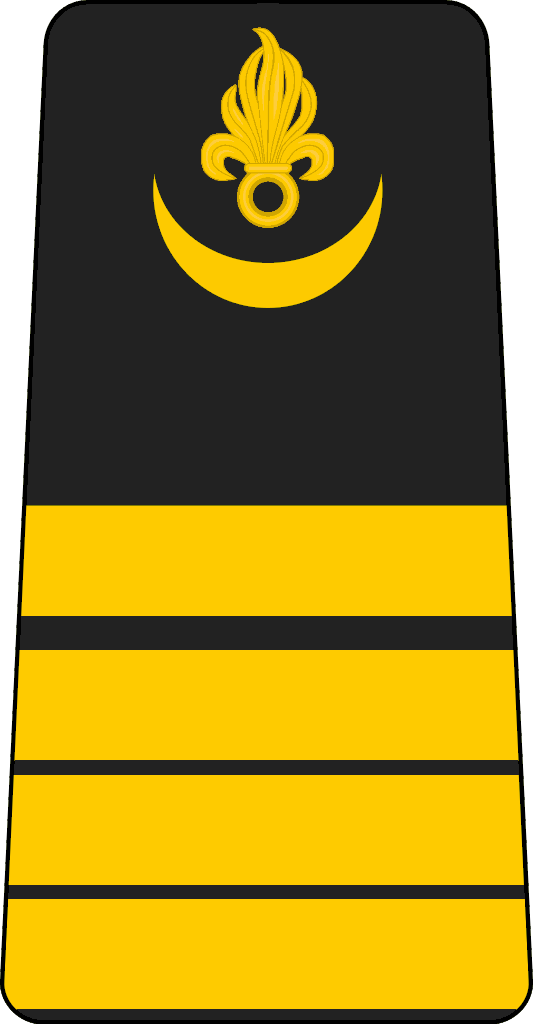
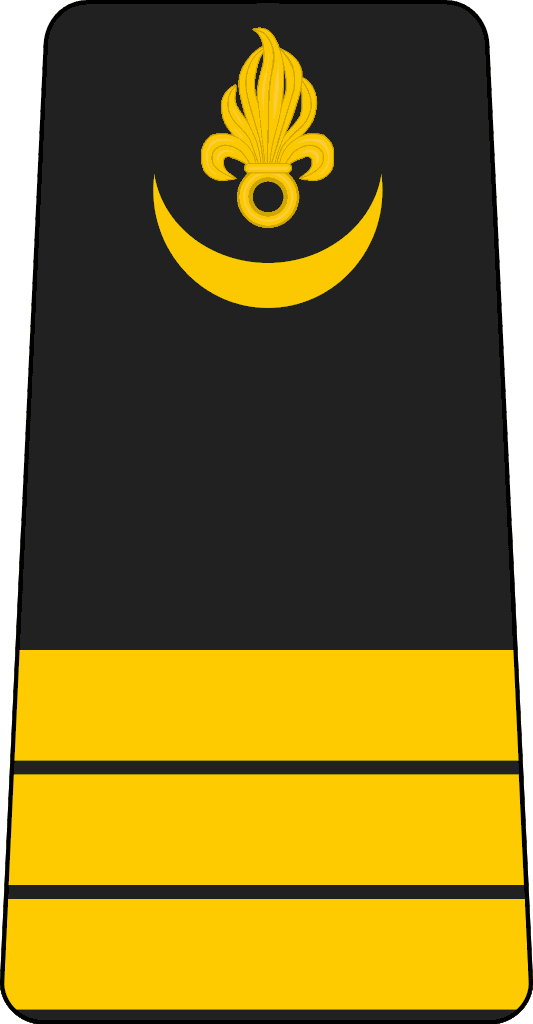
Rank group	General / flag officers		Senior officers			Junior officers
Comorian Army
Comorian Army	Général de division	Général de brigade	Colonel	Lieutenant-colonel	Commandant	Capitaine	Lieutenant	Sous-Lieutenant
Comorian Gendarmerie
Comorian Gendarmerie		Général de brigade	Colonel	Lieutenant-colonel	Commandant	Capitaine	Lieutenant	Sous-Lieutenant
Rank group	General / flag officers		Senior officers			Junior officers

== Other ranks ==
The rank insignia of non-commissioned officers and enlisted personnel.

Rank group	Senior NCOs				Junior NCOs		Enlisted
Comorian Army
Comorian Army	Adjudant-chef	Adjudant	Sergent-chef	Sergent	Caporal-chef	Caporal	Soldat de 1^{ère} classe	Soldat
Rank group	Senior NCOs				Junior NCOs		Enlisted
