= Djiboutian Army =

Land warfare branch of Djibouti's military

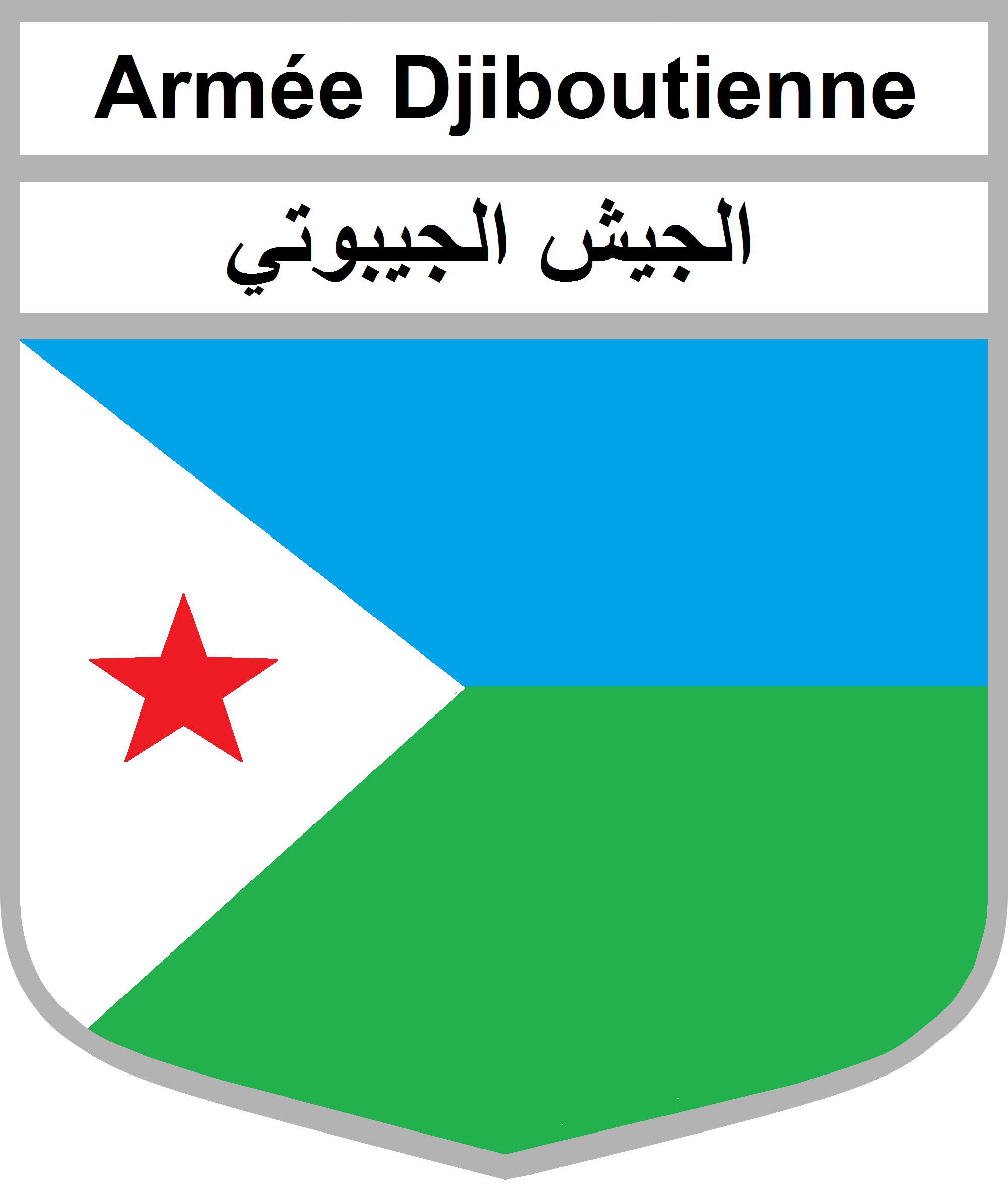
- Active: 1977–present
- Country: Djibouti
- Type: Army
- Role: Land warfare
- Size: 18,600 Active (2018 est.); 11,000 Reserve (2018 est.)
- Part of: Djibouti Armed Forces
- Engagements: Djiboutian Civil War; Djiboutian–Eritrean border conflict United Nations–African Union Mission in Darfur; African Union Mission to Somalia; African Union Transition Mission in Somalia

The Djiboutian National Army is the largest branch of the Djibouti Armed Forces and is based in the Djiboutian capital of Djibouti. Djibouti has upgraded its Ground Forces with advanced additions from domestic engineering and modifications. It must operate in mountainous and other rugged terrain, but it must do this without affecting the mechanized capability that is needed to confront regional forces.

The official tasks of the armed forces include strengthening the country against external attack, maintaining border security. It is responsible for the defence of mainland Djibouti.

During peacetime the military of Djibouti numbers approximately 9,000 with a reserve force of approximately 7,000

== Overview ==
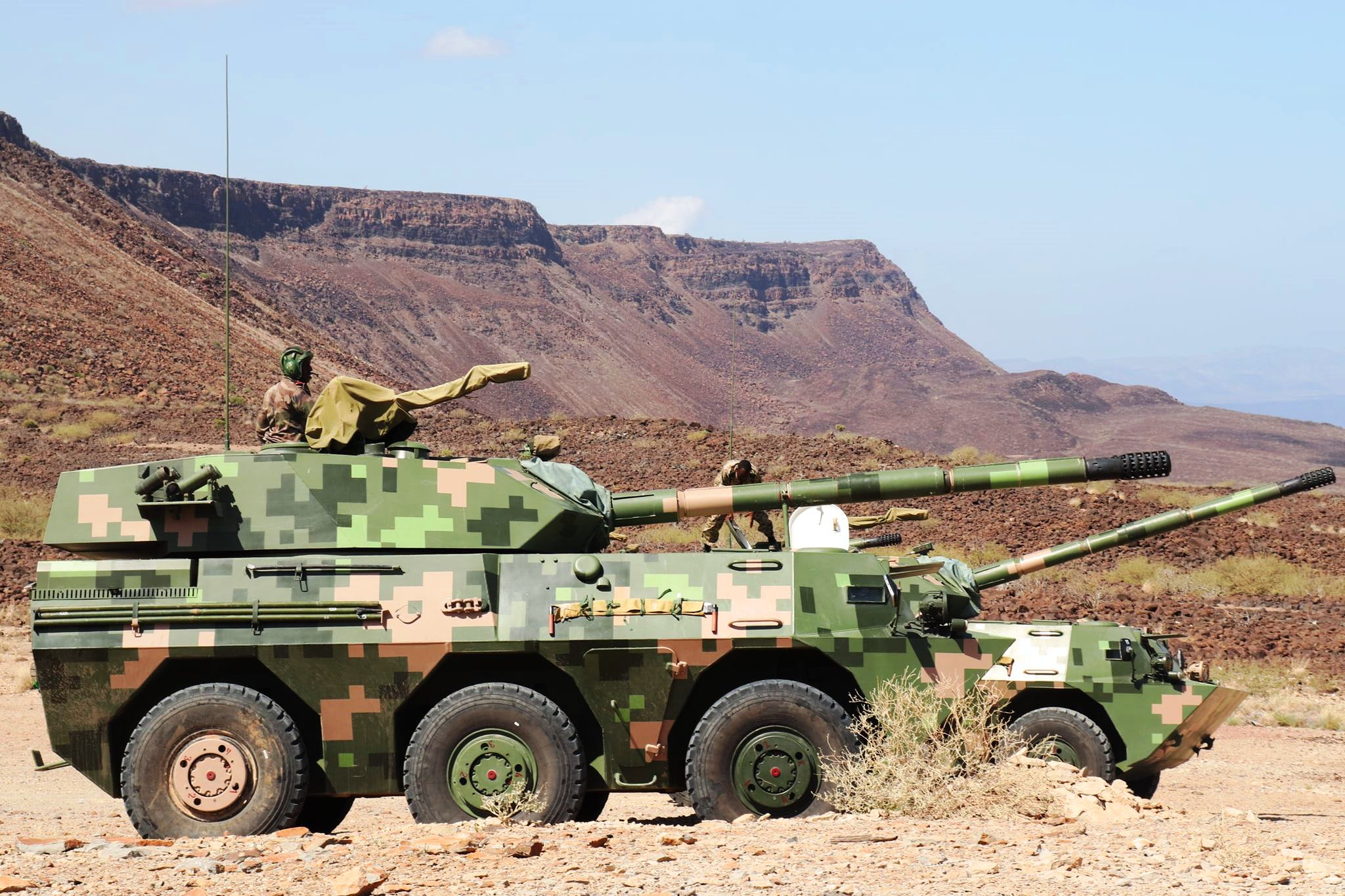
Djiboutian Army WMA-301 during a demonstration at Maryama base.

Djibouti has a smaller military than its neighbors. However, its security stops against foreign incursions. In reforming the Djiboutian National Army, most of the available attention and financial resources have been directed to the development of the Land Forces. Clashes with the Eritrean Forces, in 2008, demonstrated the superior nature of the Djiboutian forces’ training and skills, but also highlighted the fact that the small military would be unable to counter the larger, if less well-equipped forces of its neighbours. The army has concentrated on mobility in its equipment purchases, suitable for patrol duties and counterattack but ill-suited for armoured war-fare. The 2008 border clashes at least temporarily swelled the ranks of the Djiboutian army, with retired personnel being recalled, but the military's size and capabilities are much reduced since the 1990s.

As a result of tensions with neighbors during the 1980s and early 2002, the Djiboutian Army refined existing strategic concepts and eventually formulated a plan to restructure its forces. Though wars were avoided, the threats from the 1980s and 2008 encouraged the army to address more effectively its major defense disadvantage: lack of strategic depth. Thus in the early 2000s it looked outward for a model of army organization that would best advance defensive capabilities by restructuring forces into smaller, more mobile units instead of traditional divisions. Over the years, Djiboutian Army has benefited from material and financial support of various countries such as France, Egypt, Saudi Arabia, Morocco and the United States. Currently, the amount allocated to defense represents the largest single entry in the country's budget.

During, and since, the Djiboutian–Eritrean border conflict the army has exploded in size from its peacetime size of between 6,000 and 10,000.

== Organization ==
Djiboutian Army Infantry Regiments

The Army has four military districts (the Tadjourah, Dikhil, Ali-Sabieh and Obock districts).

Its maneuver units are:

- One armoured regiment (Régiment Blindé) (Djibouti)(comprising a reconnaissance squadron, three armoured squadrons and an anti-smuggling squadron)
- Four infantry regiments (each comprising three to four infantry companies and a support company)
  - Arms Regiment of Dikhil (Régiment interarmes de Dikhil)
  - Bataillon interarmes d'Ali Sabieh (Ali Sabieh)
  - Arms Regiment of Tadjourah (Régiment interarmes de Tadjourah)
  - Arms Regiment of Obock (Régiment interarmes d'Obock)
- One rapid reaction regiment (Régiment d'action rapide) (Arta)(comprising four infantry companies and a support company)
- One Republican Guard regiment
- One artillery regiment (Régiment d'artillerie) (Djibouti)
- One demining company
- One signals regiment
- One computer and information systems section
- One logistics regiment
- One maintenance company

== International mission ==
Djibouti has participated in international mission in Somalia and Sudan. There are 3,500 Djiboutian army personnel deployed abroad. Djibouti withdrew their personnel from Sudan on the 30 June 2021.

Location	Mission	Size
Somalia	ATMIS	3,500
Sudan	UNAMID	151 Police Officers

== Ranks ==
Rank group	General / flag officers		Senior officers				Junior officers
Djiboutian Army
Djiboutian Army	Général de division	Général de brigade	Colonel-major	Colonel	Lieutenant-colonel	Commandant	Capitaine	Lieutenant	Sous-lieutenant

Rank group	Senior NCOs					Junior NCOs		Enlisted
Djiboutian Army
Djiboutian Army	Major	Adjudant-chef	Adjudant	Sergent-chef	Sergent	Caporal-chef	Caporal	Soldat de 1^{ère} classe	Soldat de 2^{ème} classe
