= Army of National Development =

Military of the Comoros

Comorian Armed Forces
- Armée nationale de développement
- Comorian Coat of Arms
- Founded: 1997
- Headquarters: Moroni

Leadership
- Commander-in-chief: Azali Assoumani
- Minister of Defense: M. Yousoufa Mohamed Ali
- Chief of the Defence Staff: Colonel Youssouf Idjihadi

Industry
- Foreign suppliers: Brazil; China; Czech Republic; Hungary; Italy; India; Indonesia; Poland; Russia; Japan; South Africa; Turkey; Ukraine; Vietnam

Related articles
- Ranks: Military ranks of Comoros

The Comorian Armed Forces (French: Armée nationale de développement, AND; lit. 'National Army for Development') are the national military of the Comoros.

The armed forces consist of a small standing army and a 500-member police force, as well as a 500-member defense force. A defense treaty with France provides naval resources for protection of territorial waters, training of Comorian military personnel, and air surveillance. France maintains a small troop presence in the Comoros at government request. France maintains a small Navy base and a Foreign Legion Detachment (DLEM) (now the 5th Foreign Infantry Regiment) in Mayotte. In 2008, the size of the armed forces was estimated to be 1,060.

The AND has worked with the United States and African Union armed forces as well. In 2008, the African Union helped the AND retake control of Anjouan after the island had been taken over by rebels.

== Structure ==
The AND consists of the following components:

- Comorian Ground Defense Force
- Comorian National Gendarmerie
- National School of the Armed Forces and Gendarmerie
- Comorian Air Force
- Comorian Presidential Guard
- Comorian Military Health Services
- Comorian Coast Guard

== Equipment inventory ==
- FN FAL battle rifle
- AK-47 assault rifle
- Type 81 assault rifle
- NSV HMG
- RPG-7 anti-tank weapon
- Mitsubishi L200 pickup truck

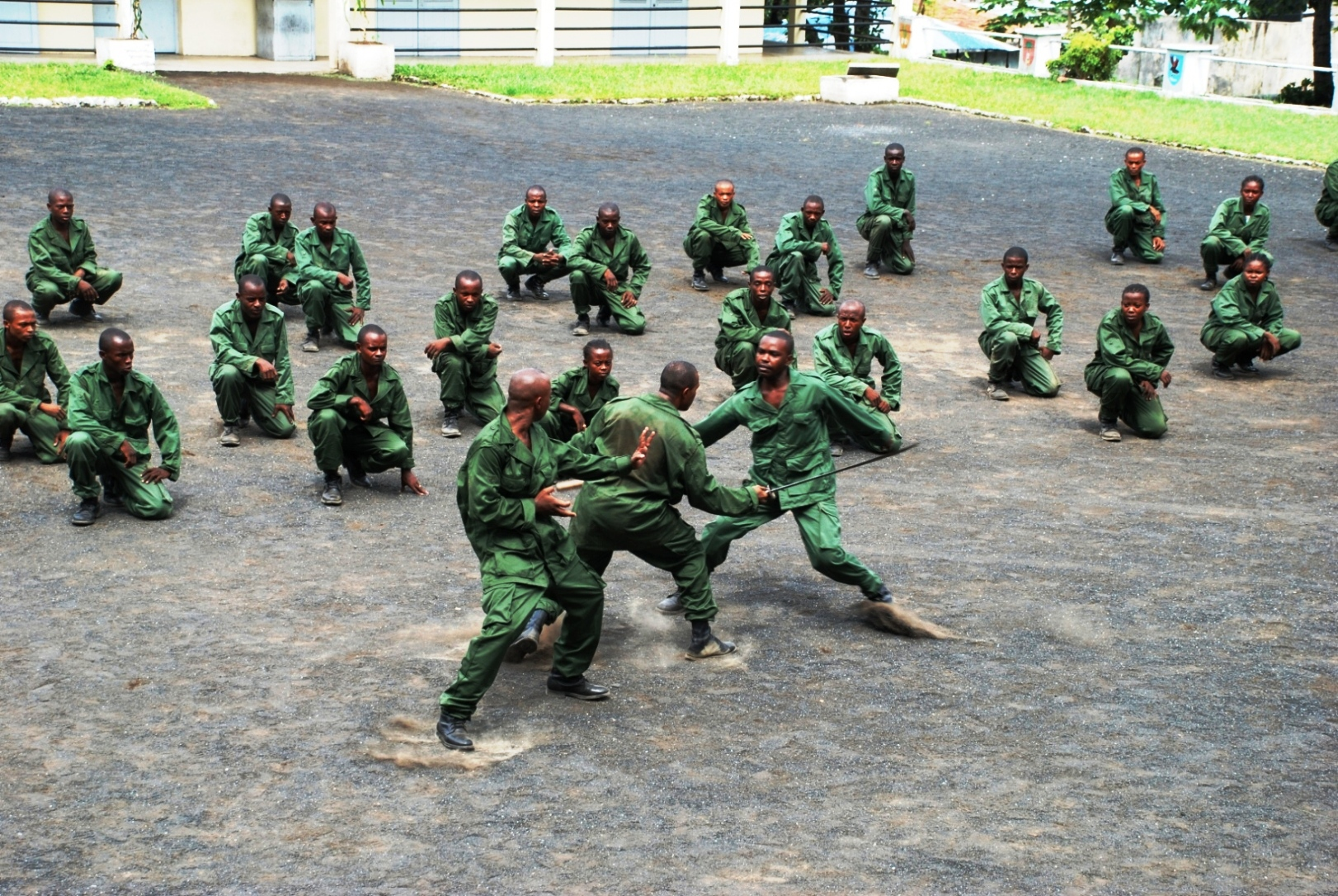
Comoran Defense Force soldiers show off hand-to-hand combat skills

== Aircraft ==
Note: The last comprehensive aircraft inventory list was from Aviation Week & Space Technology in 2007.

Aircraft	Origin	Type	Variant	In service	Notes
Transport
Cessna 402	United States	Transport		1	
L-410 Turbolet	Czech Republic	Transport		1	
Aérospatiale Corvette	France	VIP transport		1	
Helicopters
Mil Mi-14	Russia	Transport / Utility	Mi-14PZh	2	
Eurocopter AS350 Écureuil	France	Utility		1	
Trainer aircraft
SIAI-Marchetti SF.260	Italy	Patrol / Trainer		5	
