= Commandant (rank) =

Military or police rank

Commandant (/ˌkɒmənˈdɑːnt/, /ˌkɒmənˈdænt/, /ˈkʌmədənt/; French: [kɔmɑ̃dɑ̃]) is a military rank used in many - typically Francophone or Hispanophone - countries, where it is usually equivalent to the rank of major.

== Canada ==
Commandant d'aviation was the Canadian French term for the air force rank of squadron leader (prior to the 2014 amendment of the National Defence Act). The rank of squadron leader itself had not been held by active duty personnel in the Canadian Forces since 1968 when it was replaced by major.

== Ireland ==
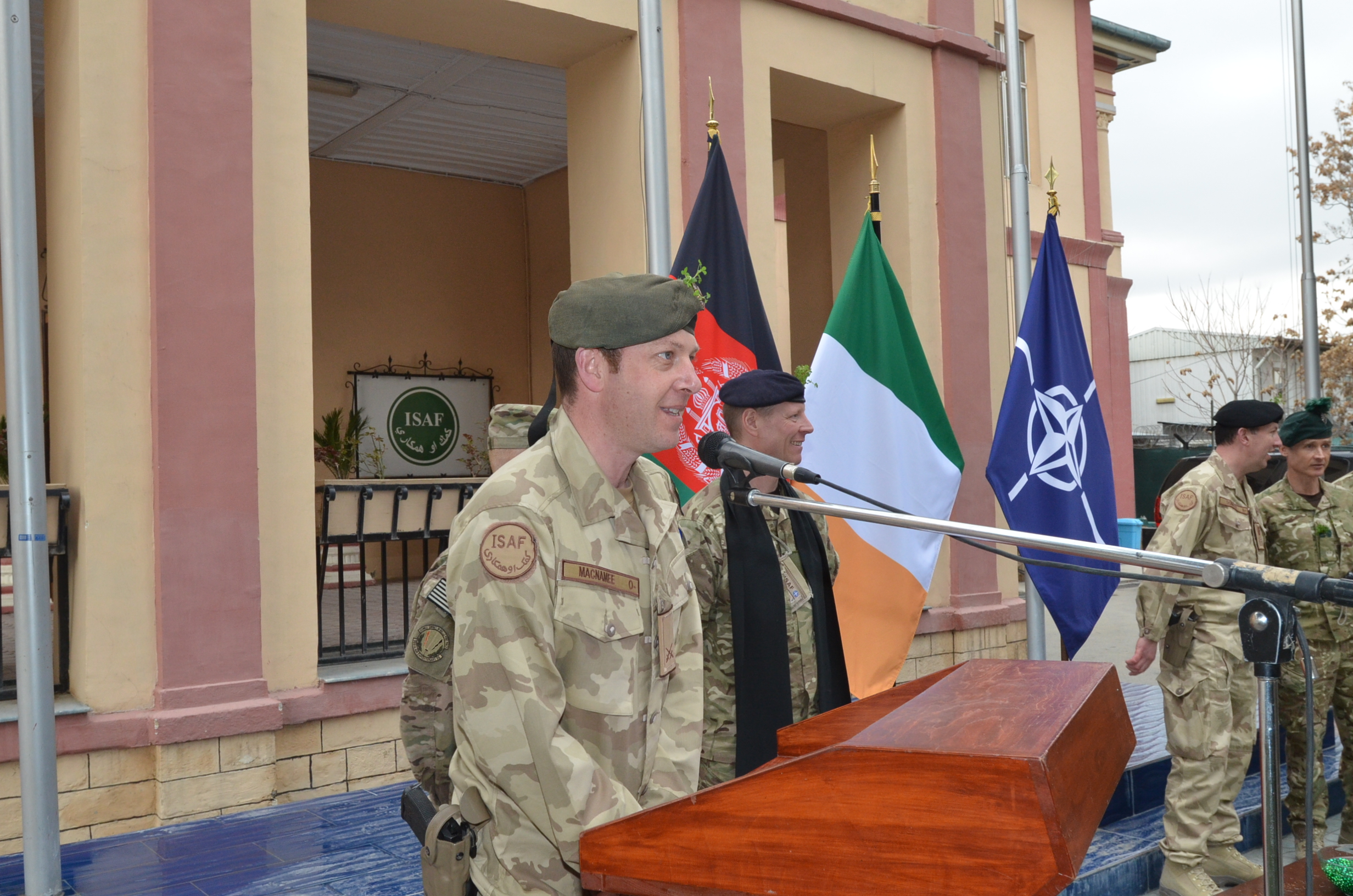
Comdt MacNamee (Irish Army, International Security Assistance Force) in Afghanistan, 2013. Note the crossed-swords rank insignia on his left breast.

Commandant (Comdt) (Irish: Ceannfort) is a military rank in both the Irish Army and Irish Air Corps. It is equivalent to major and squadron leader. In the Irish Naval Service, the equivalent rank is lieutenant commander.

Irish Army commandant's subdued rank slide

Irish Air Corps rank insignia

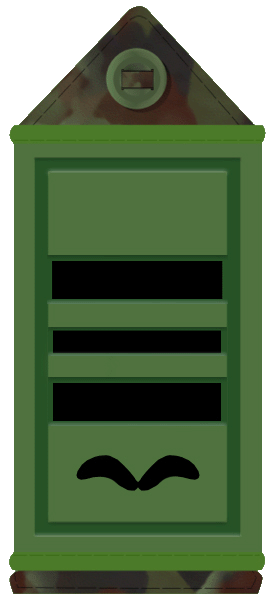
Irish Air Corps rank insignia (green)

== India ==
Commandant is a rank in the Central Armed Police Forces of India (BSF, CRPF, CISF, ITBP, SSB). It is equivalent to the rank of Colonel/Captain/Group Captain. Commandant rank officers generally command battalions in the CAPFs. In the Indian Coast Guard, ranks of Commandant and Commandant (Junior grade) exist. While Commandant is equivalent to Colonel/Captain/Group Captain, Commandant (Junior grade) is equivalent to Lieutenant Colonel/Commander/Wing Commander.

== France ==
Commandant Commandant
- Army and air force insignia
- Country: France
- Service branch: Army; Air Force; Gendarmerie
- Abbreviation: CDT
- Rank group: Senior officer
- NATO rank code: OF-3
- Next higher rank: Lieutenant colonel
- Next lower rank: Captain
- Equivalent ranks: Corvette captain

Commandant is an officer-grade rank of the Military of France, specifically the French Army and the French Air and Space Force, in both of which it has NATO level OF-3: equivalent to major or lieutenant-commander. In this context, it is shortened form of the previous rank capitaine-commandant: i.e. a "captain commanding (a battalion)".

The commandant is also styled chef de bataillon ("battalion leader") in the infantry, chef d'escadrons ("squadrons leader") (Note: Before 1815, a French cavalry squadron was formed by assembling two companies. In 1815, cavalry companies were redesignated as squadrons and - a few years later - the battalion-equivalent units in the cavalry (several squadrons) were named squadrons groups (groupes d'escadrons) so the rank of the commanding officer of a squadrons group became chef d'escadrons (with an s) in the French cavalry.) in the armoured cavalry and chef d'escadron ("squadron leader") in the artillery and the Gendarmerie. They are all addressed as either Mon commandant, or Commandant. (Note: Mon commandant (Mon for Monsieur) is used for male officers.)

=== French Army ===
The French Army is divided into "horse troops" (troupes à cheval, with silver braids) (Note: There are a few exceptions: for example the Spahis (a cavalry unit) have yellow braids) and "foot troops" (troupes à pied - with golden braids)

- Troupes à cheval (horse troops):
  - cavalry, tanks : chef d'escadrons
  - transportation units, artillery : chef d'escadron
- Troupes à pied (foot units):
  - infantry, combat engineers : chef de bataillon

=== Gendarmerie ===
The Gendarmerie, while not part of the Army, uses a comparable rank system

- Gendarmerie line officers: chef d'escadron - four silver (white) braids for the Departmental Gendarmerie, four golden (yellow) braids for the Mobile Gendarmerie and the Republican Guard
- Gendarmerie administrative corps: commandant - four silver (white) braids

=== Air and Space force ===
- Air and Space force: commandant

=== Navy ===
In the French Navy, commandant is an appointment or operational command, rather than a rank, namely, the commanding officer (CO) of a ship, e.g. capitaine de vaisseau (vessel), capitaine de frégate (frigate), capitaine de corvette (corvette) or lieutenant de vaisseau. As such, it can refer to the holders of several ranks. They are all addressed as commandant, regardless of rank or sex.

=== Note on Majors in the French armed forces ===
While the most frequent equivalent of Commandant is Major in English-speaking courntries, the word Major (France) has had - and still has - an entirely different meaning in the French Armed forces.

Prior to the French Revolution, the major was the officer appointed by the King to keep track of the expenditures and readiness of a regiment. He could have a deputy (an aide-major) and could be either a commoner or a nobleman. A major was graded as a commissar, not an officer.

Since the lieutenant-colonel rank had been abolished by the Revolution, during the Napoleonic Period, it was replaced by the rank of Major. The Major was second in command of a regiment and frequently in charge of the bataillon de dépot or the escadron de dépot training recruits in the rear. The officer at commandant rank level was the chef de bataillon or chef d'escadron.

Nowadays, Major is the most senior warrant officer rank, above adjudant-chef.

=== Other uses ===
Commandant is also a rank in the National Police and in other civilian administrations.

French infantry - chef de bataillon

French cavalry - chef d'escadron(s)

French Air and Space Force commandant

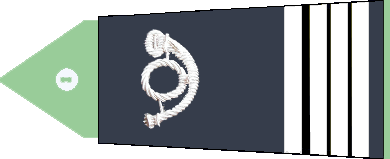
Commandant des Eaux et Forêts

== Spain ==
In the Spanish Army and Spanish Air Force, the rank of comandante is senior to a captain and junior to a lieutenant colonel, making it equivalent to the rank of major or squadron leader in English-speaking countries.

== Latin America ==
Comandante ("commandant") is a military officer rank used in some Latin American countries. The Chilean Air Force uses the rank of comandante de escuadrilla ("squadron commandant") as a rank equivalent to the British rank of squadron leader. The Peruvian Air Force uses the rank of comandante as an equivalent to lieutenant-colonel or wing commander.

Comandante can be translated into English either as "commandant" or as "commander". The rank may also be found in numerous paramilitary and guerrilla organizations, such as the Sandinistas and the Cuban Revolutionary Armed Forces.

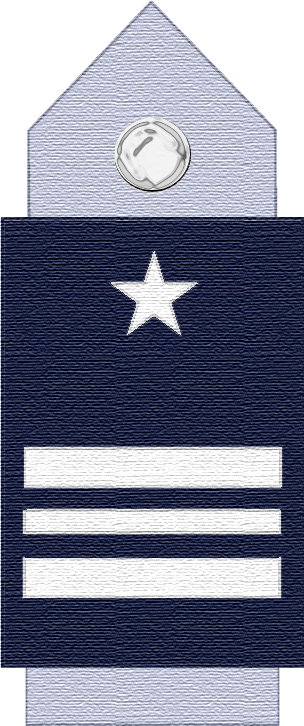
Chilean Air Force squadron commandant rank insignia (epaulette)

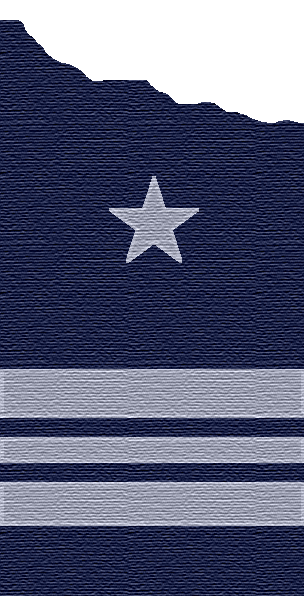
Chilean Air Force squadron commandant rank insignia (sleeve)

== South Africa ==
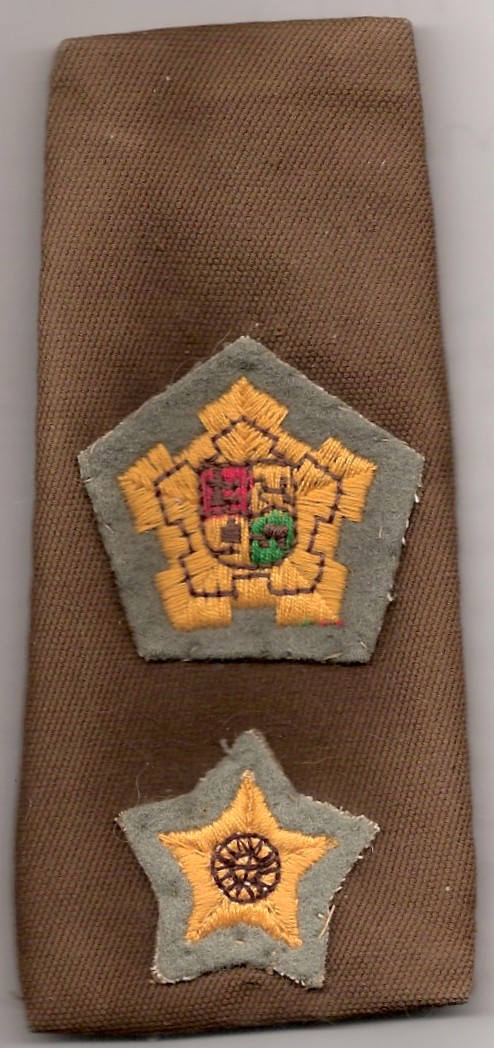
South African army commandant insignia 1950-1994

In South Africa, commandant was the title of the commanding officer of a commando (militia) unit, initially in the Cape Colony and later also in the Boer republics.

From 1950 to 1994 commandant was the official designation of the rank of lieutenant-colonel in the South African Army, South African Air Force, and South African Medical Service.

From 1950 to 1957, the rank insignia for a commandant (Kommandant in Afrikaans) was a crown over a five-pointed star. In 1957 the crown was replaced by a pentagonal castle device based on the floor plan of the Castle of Good Hope in Cape Town, South Africa's oldest military building. In 1994, the rank of commandant / kommandant reverted to lieutenant colonel.

From 1968 to 1970, a related rank, chief commandant (hoofkommandant), existed in the Commando Forces [the rural part-time, territorial reserve, roughly equivalent to a National Guard or Home Guard]. This rank of chief commandant existed purely in the army and slotted in between commandant and colonel. The rank was only used by officers commanding commando groups (i.e. a small formation consisting of two or more commando units).

== United Kingdom ==
In the United Kingdom the term commandant usually refers to an appointment, not a rank. However, between 1922 and 1928 the rank of brigadier-general was replaced by colonel-commandant. This was not well received, and was replaced by brigadier.

Later, senior commandant and chief commandant were Auxiliary Territorial Service ranks equivalent to major and lieutenant-colonel respectively used between 1939 and May 1941, when they were replaced by senior and chief commander. The Commanding Officers of individual battalions of the Brigade of Gurkhas was designated a Commandant, rather than a commanding officer; and so with the Bermuda Militia Artillery (1895-1965). These ranks were also used in the Women's Auxiliary Air Force until December 1939, when they were replaced by squadron officer and wing officer (equating to squadron leader and wing commander) respectively. The rank was also used for senior commanders of the Ulster Special Constabulary (B Specials).

== Gallery ==
=== Army insignia ===
Commandant
Arabic: رائد, romanized: Ra'id)
(Algerian Land Forces)

Commandant
(Benin Army)

Commandant
(Burkina Faso Ground Forces)

Commandant
(Cameroon Ground Forces)

Commandant
(Central African Ground Forces)

Commandant
(Chadian Ground Forces)

Commandant
(Comorian Army)

Commandant
(Congolese Ground Forces)

Commandant
(Djiboutian Army)

Comandante
(Army of Equatorial Guinea)

Commandant
(French Army)

Commandant
(Gabonese Army)

Commandant
(Guinea Ground Forces)

Commandant
(Irish: Ceannfort)
(Irish Army)

Commandant
(Ivory Coast Ground Forces)

Commandant
(Madagascar Ground Forces)

Commandant
(Mali Army)

Commandant
(Royal Moroccan Army)

Commandant
(Niger Army)

Commandant
(Senegalese Army)

Comandante
(Spanish Army)

Commandant
(Togolese Army)

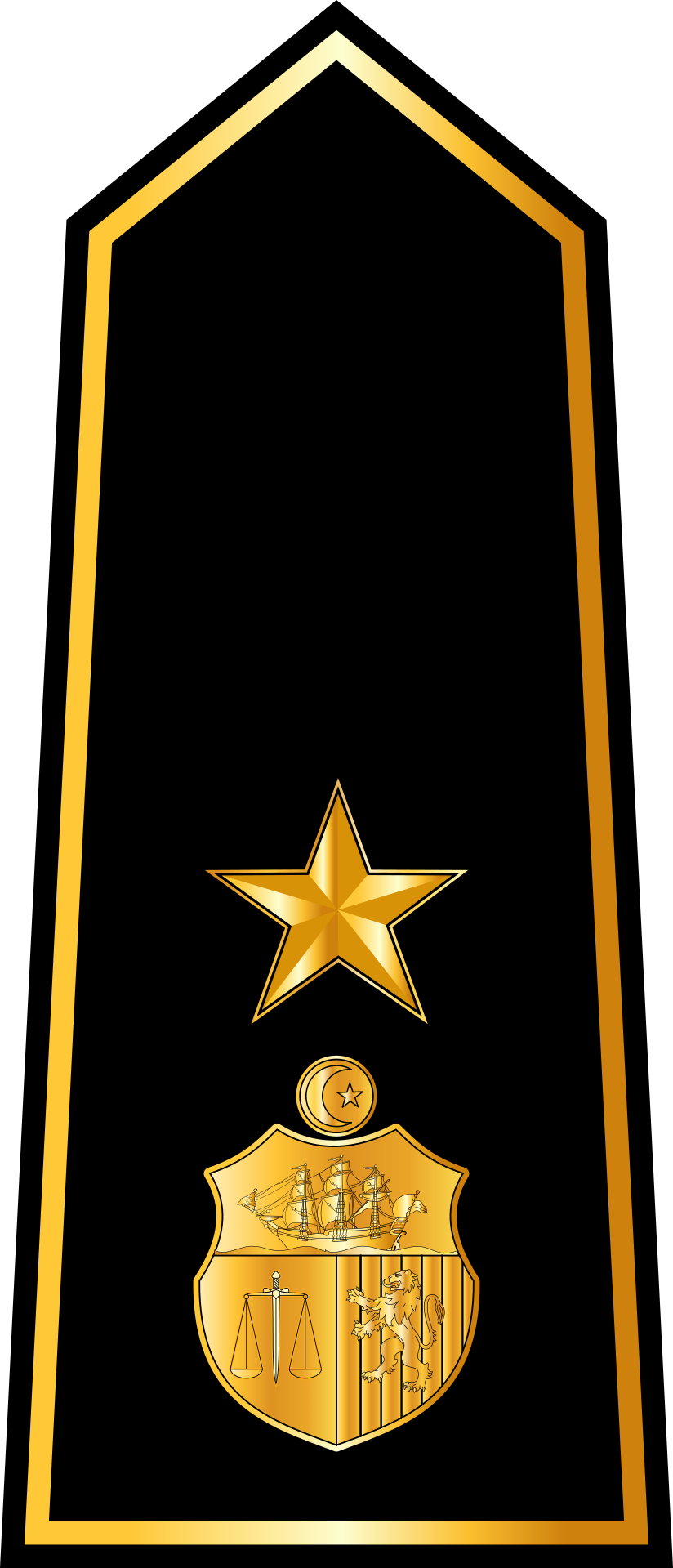
Commandant
(Arabic: رائد, romanized: Ra'id)
(Tunisian Army)
