= Senior colonel =

Rank in certain armed forces

Senior colonel is an officer rank usually placed between a regular colonel and a British brigadier or American brigadier general.

== Use ==
Most western militaries tend to equate a senior colonel as being on the level of a "brigadier general"; however, this is not necessarily so. Nations which maintain senior colonel ranks may also have five general ranks (most such nations also having the rank of colonel general). A senior colonel is also not befitted honors of a general or flag officer. It is simply seen as the highest field officer rank before the general grades. In this sense, the rank is seen as comparable to the rank of brigadier in the British Army and some other Commonwealth armies, similarly a senior field rank.

A similar title to senior colonel is that of senior captain, also used in most Communist countries. However, it may also be found in some western militaries as a staff rank appointed to a regular captain.

The term senior colonel is also used informally and unofficially in the U.S. military for colonels who have either been selected for promotion to brigadier general but not actually promoted yet, or for veteran colonels who are particularly experienced and influential. The Argentine Army makes a similar use of the term, though in this case it is an official distinction (Coronel Mayor) with its own rank insignia (a single red-trimmed golden sun instead of the three golden suns of a regular colonel). In the Portuguese Army, a colonel selected but still waiting for promotion to a general officer rank is officially designated coronel tirocinado (literally meaning "practiced colonel" in Portuguese), having a proper rank insignia (the rank stripes of colonel added with a general rank silver star). Between 1929 and 1937 the coronel tirocinado were called a brigadeiro, using the badge currently in use.

In Nazi Germany, a rank equivalent to senior colonel, Oberführer, was used by both the SA and SS. In the branches of the Allgemeine SS (General SS) and Waffen-SS (Armed SS) the rank of Oberführer was widely used. The rank did not exist in the army (Heer), although the Kriegsmarine (navy) maintained the equivalent rank of Kommodore.

Senior colonel is also used as the translation for other ranks, such as the Vietnamese Đại tá.

== Senior colonel's insignia ==
Coronel mayor
(Argentine Army)

Colonel major
(Burkina Faso Ground Forces)

Primer coronel
(Cuban Revolutionary Army)

Colonel major
(Ivory Coast Ground Forces)

Colonel major
(Mali Army)

Colonel major
(Royal Moroccan Army)

Coronel-tirocinado
(Portuguese Army)

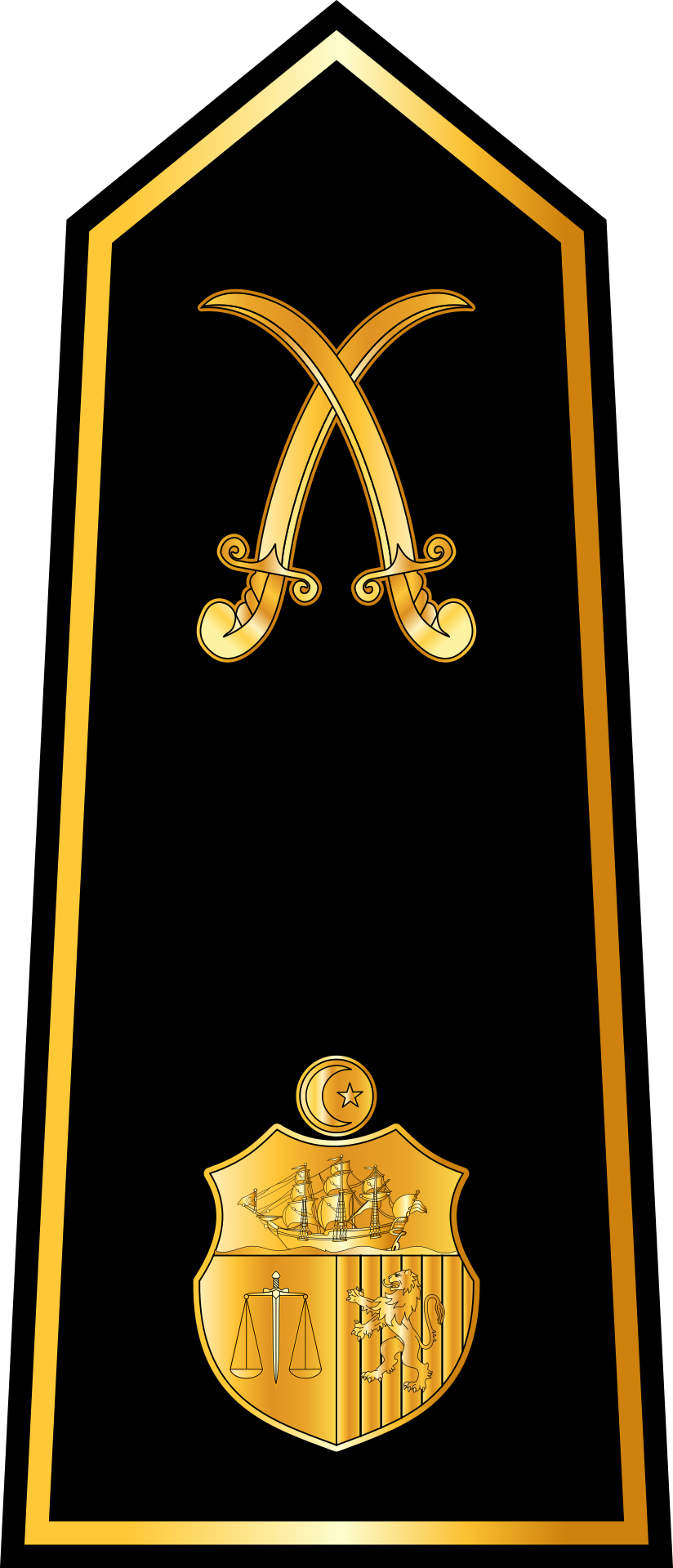
Colonel major
(Arabic: عميد, romanized: Amid)
(Tunisian Army)

Överste av 1. graden
(Swedish Army)

== See also ==
- Colonel commandant
- Adjutant general
- Comparative military ranks
