= Comparative air force enlisted ranks of the Commonwealth =

Rank comparison chart of air forces of Commonwealth of Nations states.

== Enlisted ==
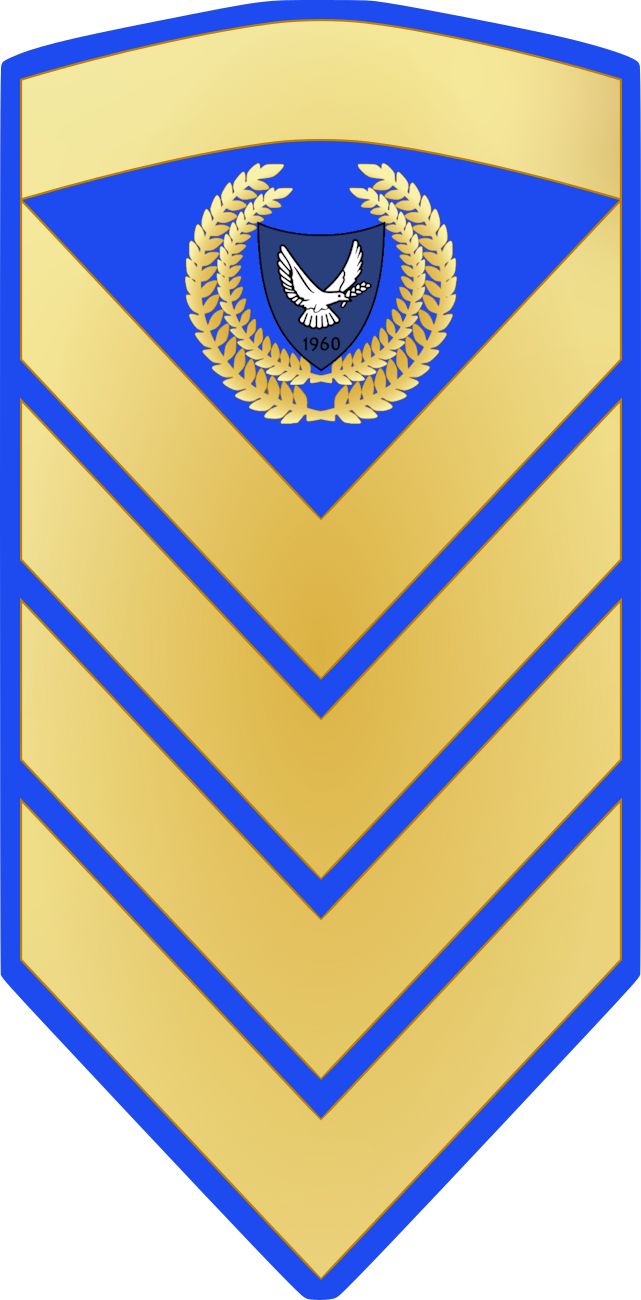
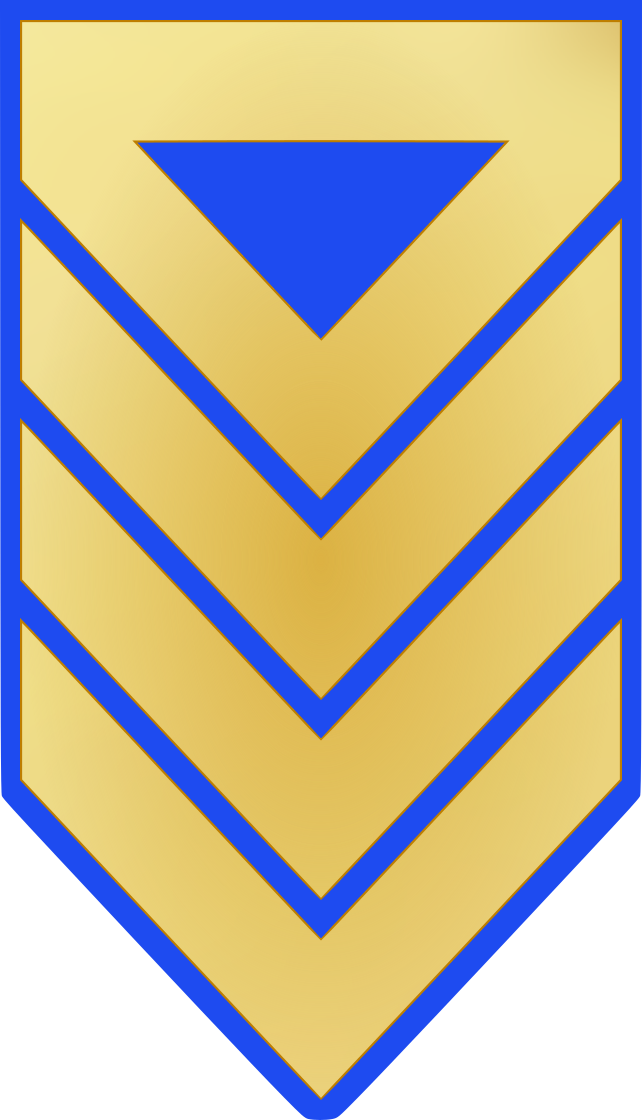
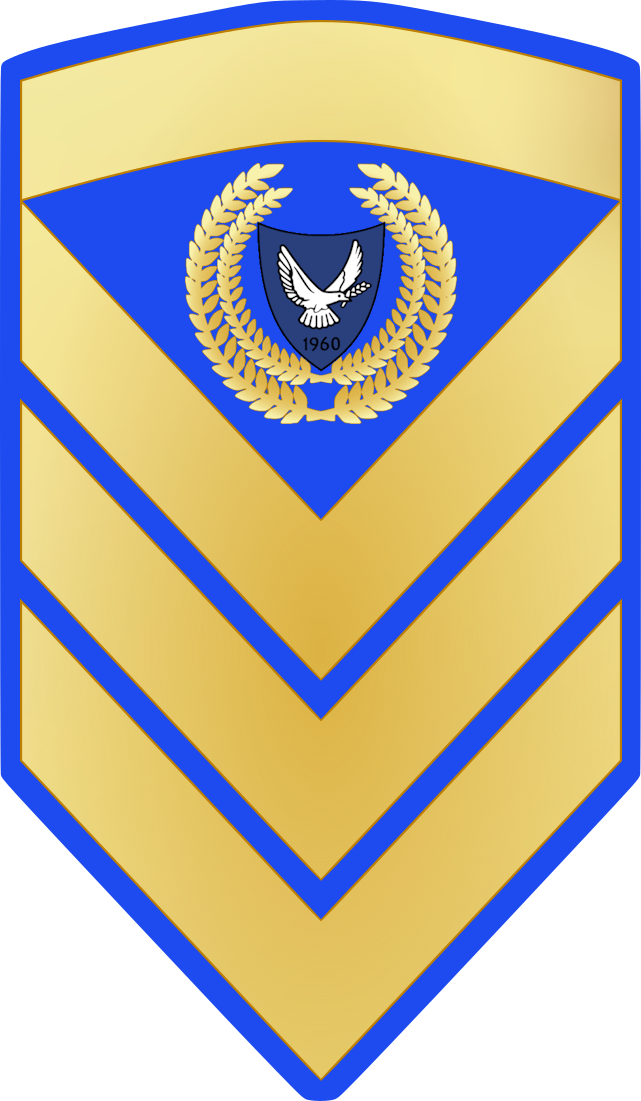
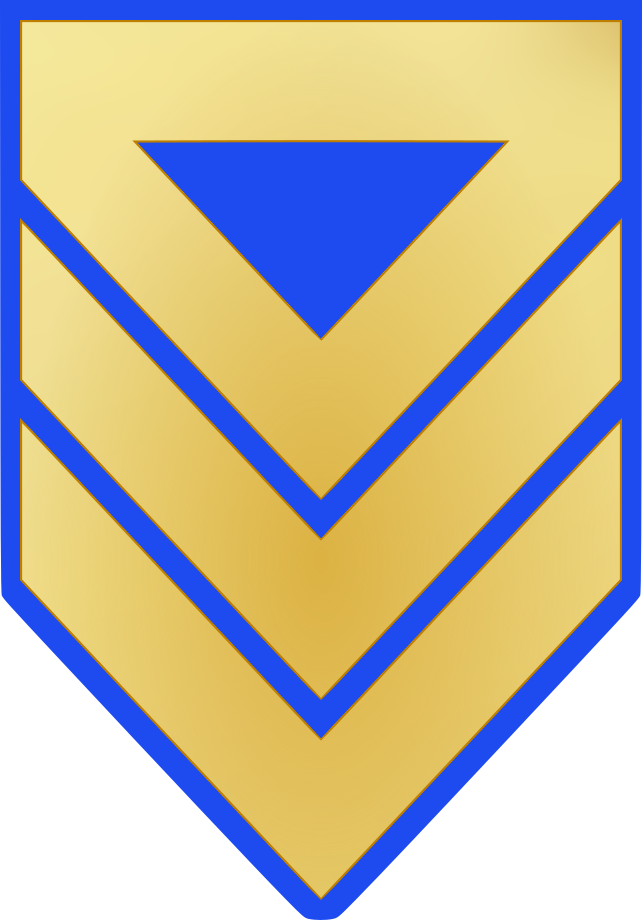
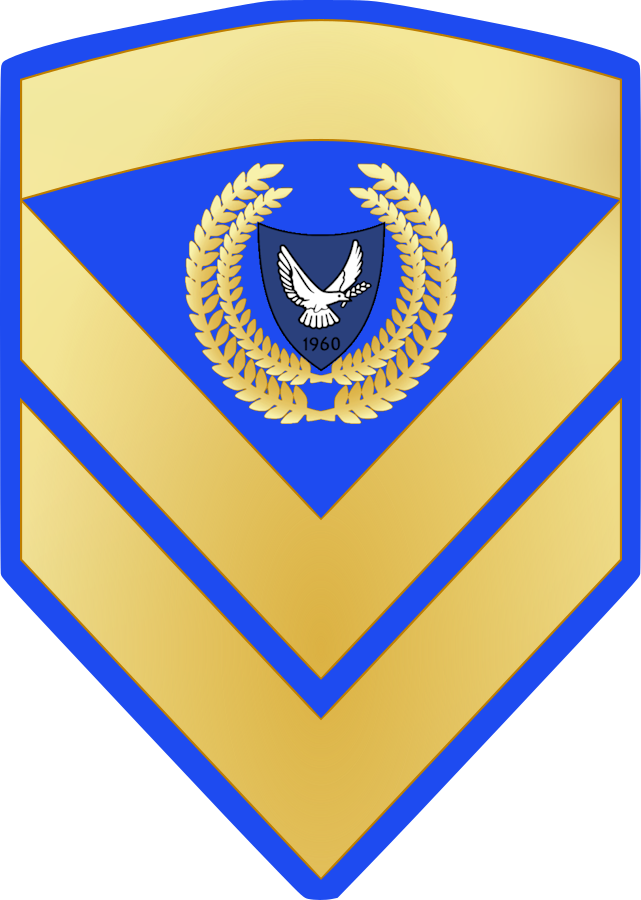
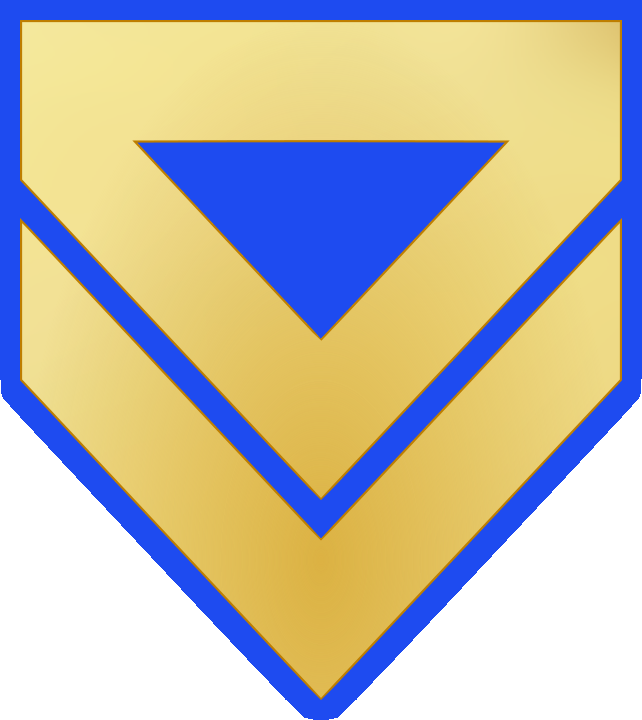
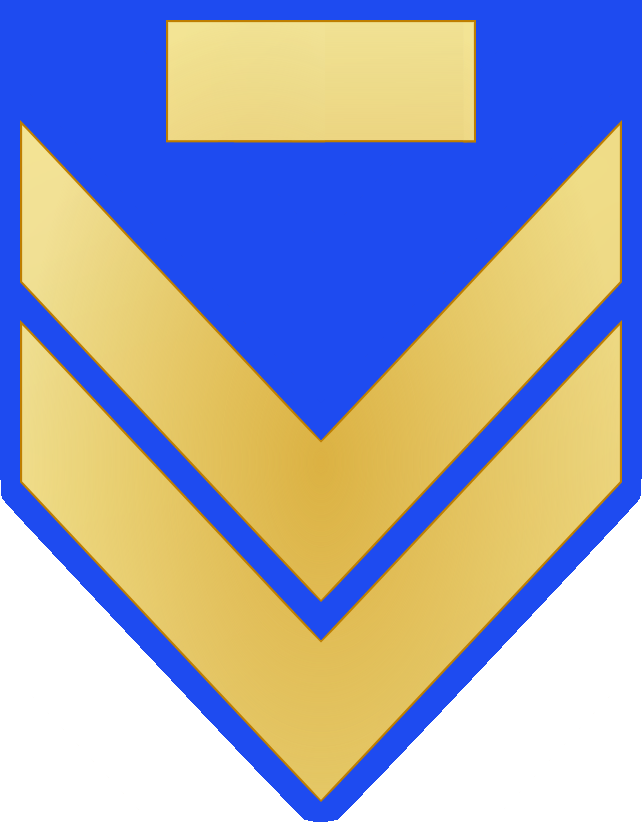
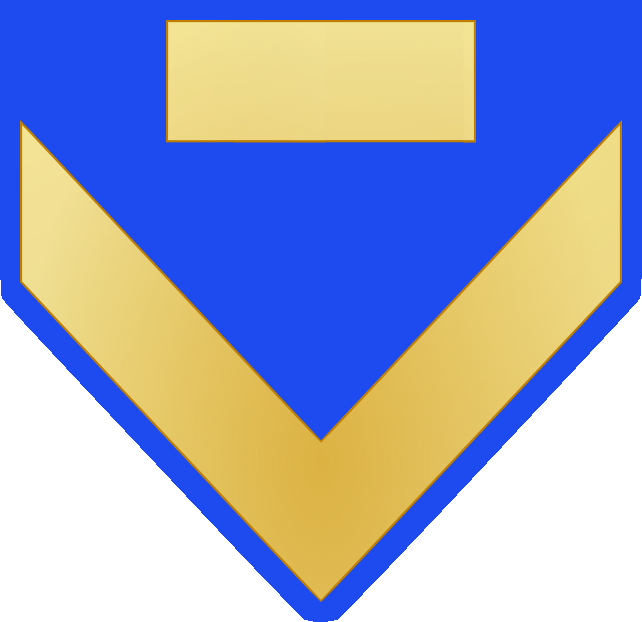
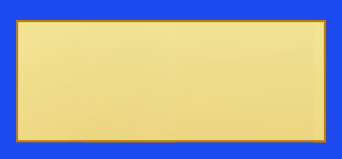
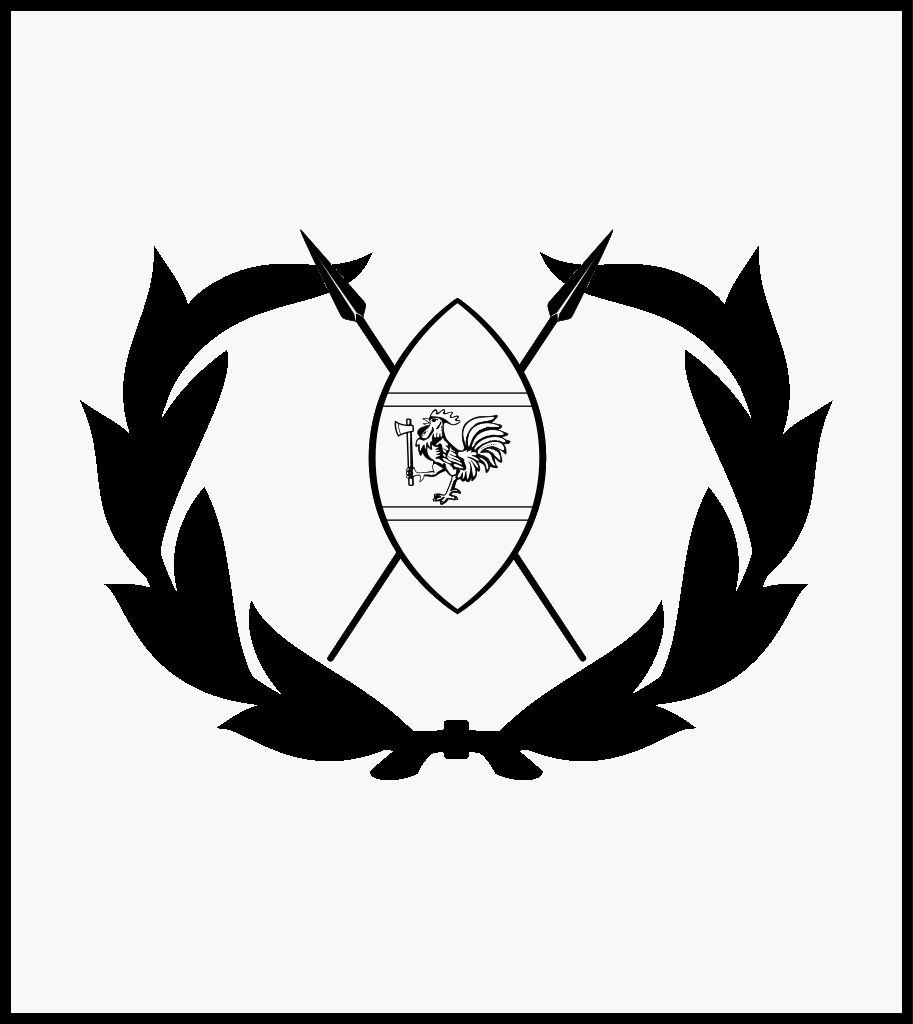
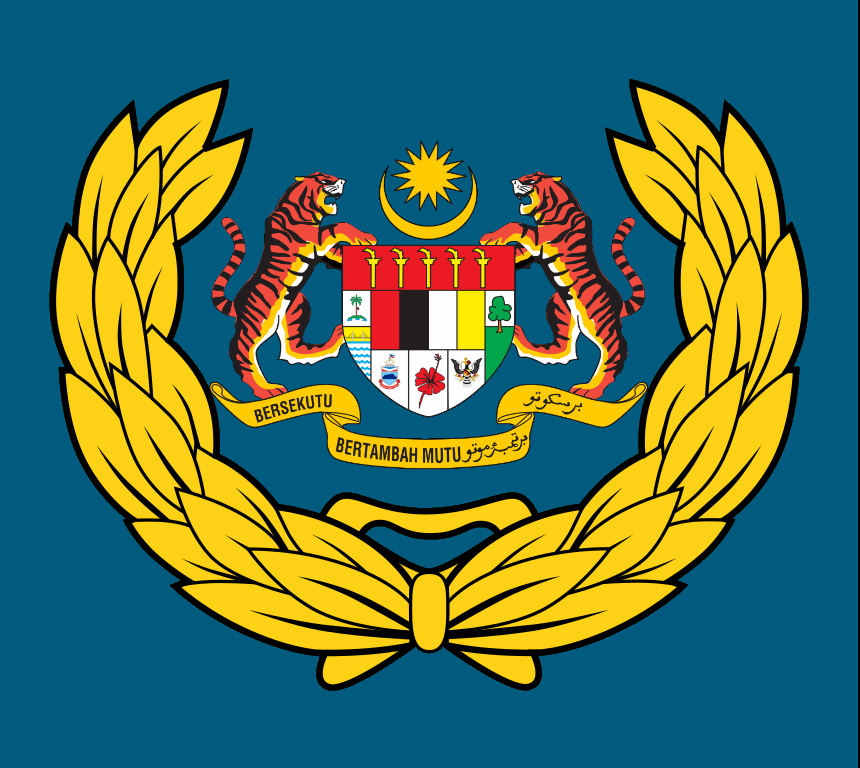
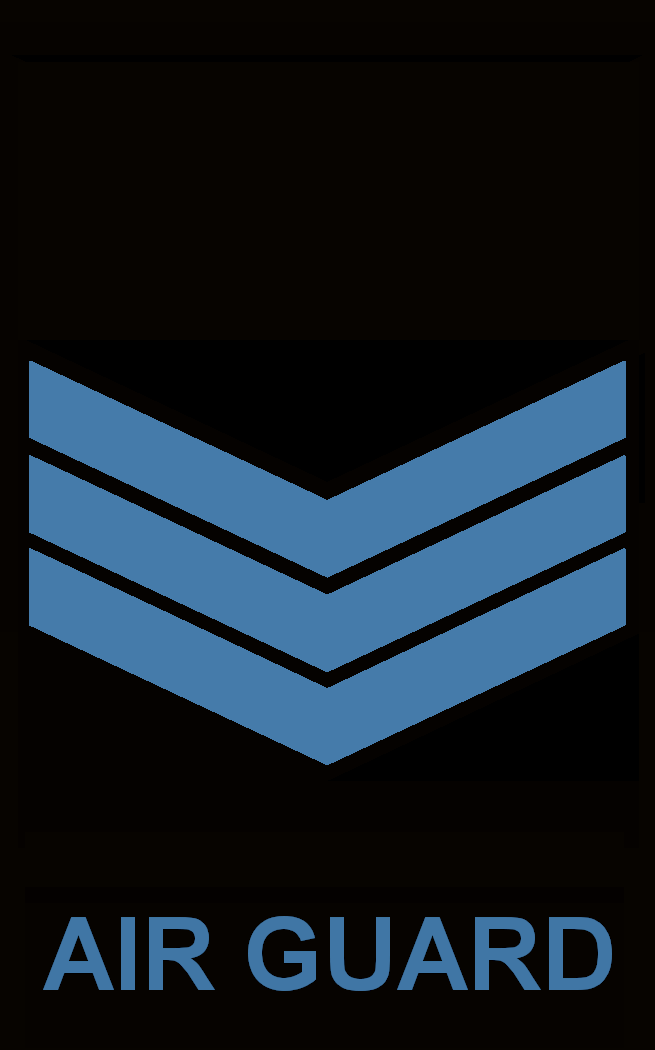
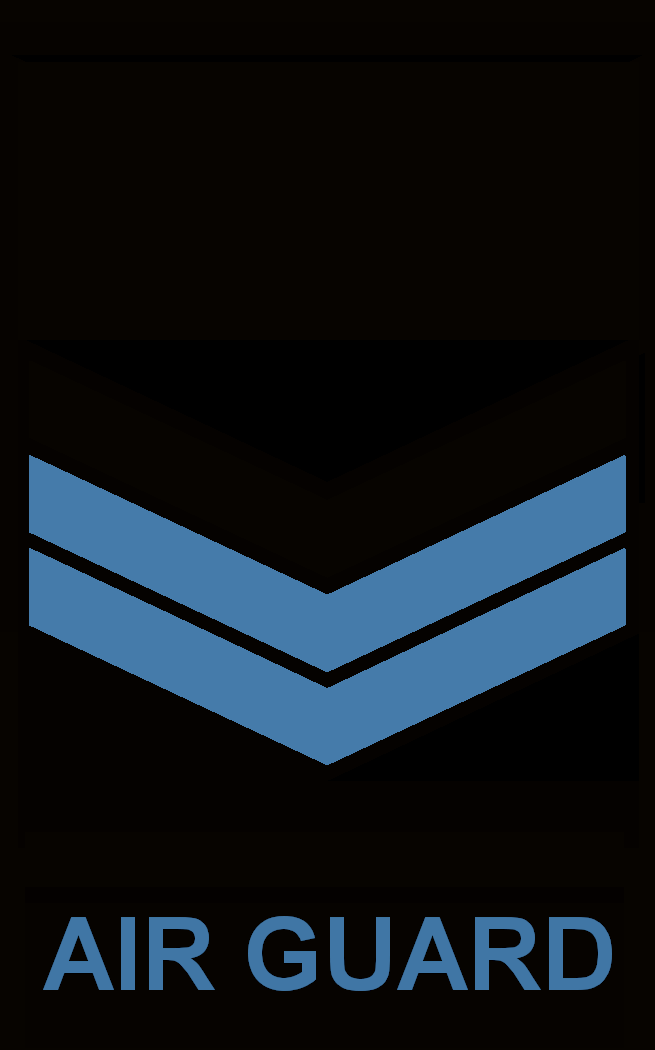
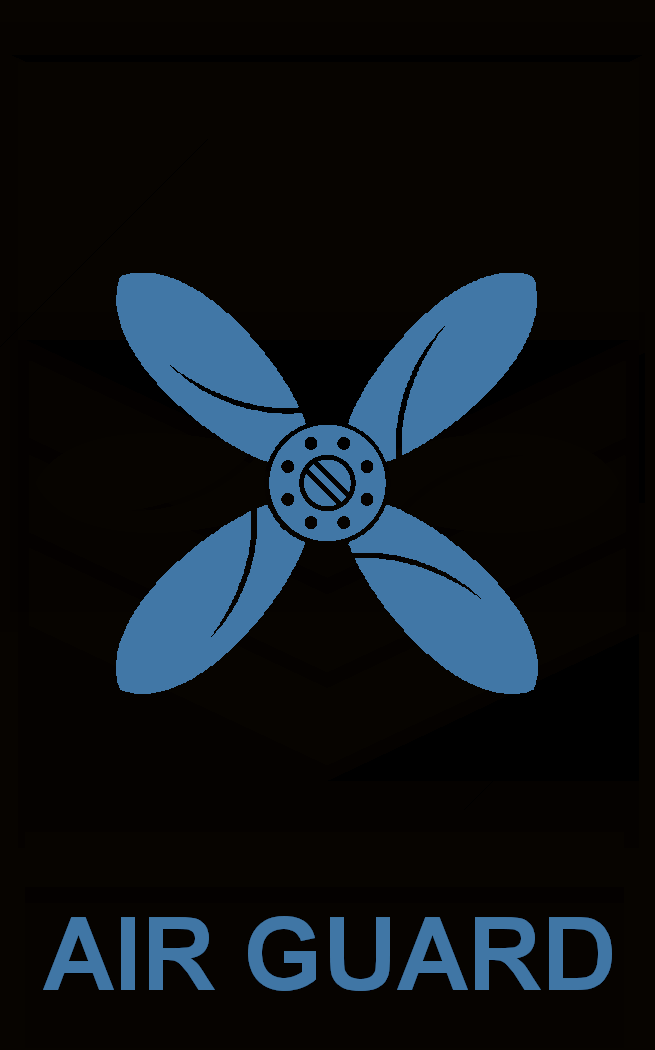
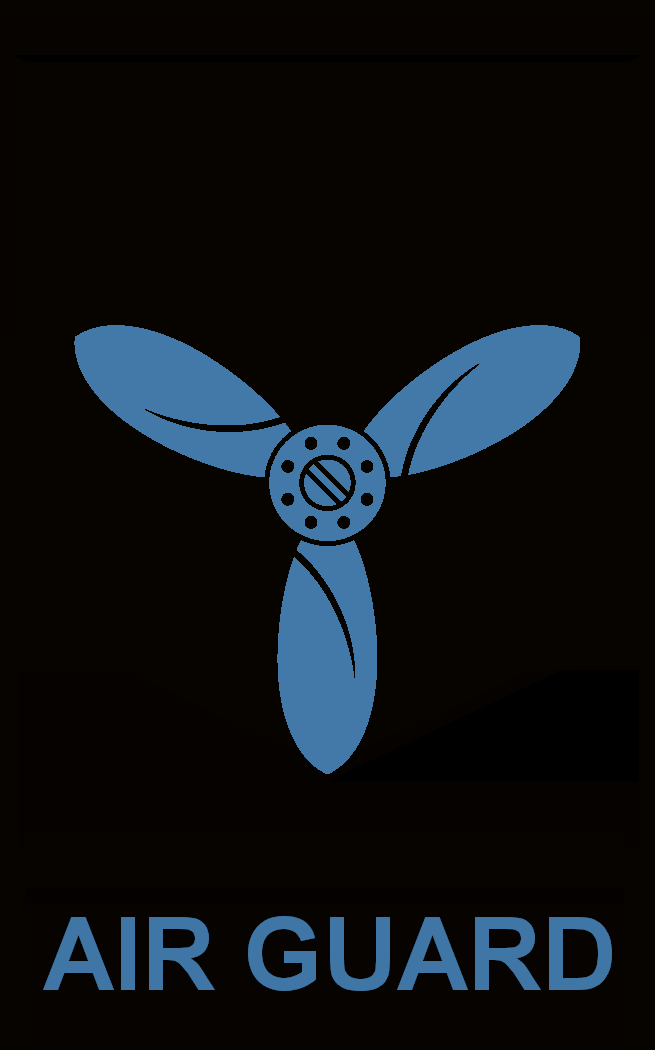
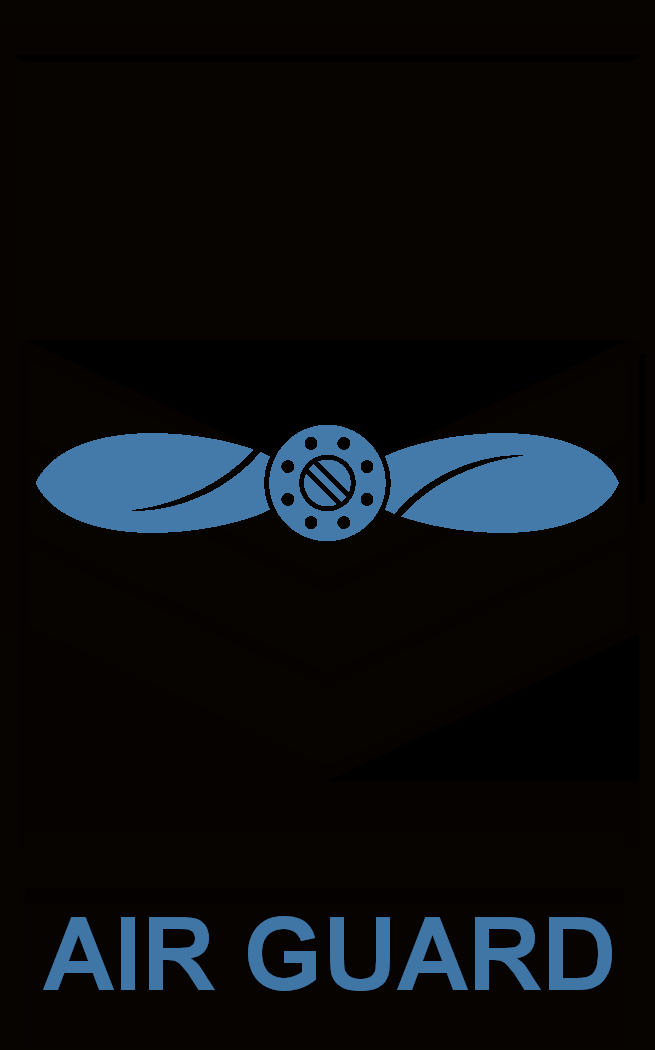
Rank group	Senior NCOs							Junior NCOs			Enlisted
Antigua and Barbuda	No air force
Royal Australian Air Force
Royal Australian Air Force	Warrant Officer of the Air Force	Warrant officer	Flight sergeant			Sergeant		Corporal			Leading aircraftman/ aircraftwoman			Aircraftman/ aircraftwoman
(The Bahamas) Bahamas	No air force
Bangladesh Air Force															No insignia
Bangladesh Air Force	মাস্টার ওয়ারেন্ট অফিসার; Māsṭār ōẏārēnṭ ôphisār		সিনিয়র ওয়ারেন্ট অফিসার; Siniẏar ōẏārēnṭ ôphisār	ওয়ারেন্ট অফিসার; Ōẏārēnṭ ôphisār		সার্জেন্ট; Sārjēnṭ		কর্পোর‍্যাল; Kôrpōral			লীডিং এয়ারক্র্যাফটম্যান; Līḍing ēẏārkrāphṭmaen			এয়ারক্র্যাফটম্যান-১; Ēẏārkrāphṭmaen-1	এয়ারক্র্যাফটম্যান-২; Ēẏārkrāphṭmaen-2
Botswana Defence Force Air Wing														No insignia
Botswana Defence Force Air Wing	Warrant officer class 1		Warrant officer class 2	Staff sergeant		Sergeant		Corporal		Lance corporal				Private (or equivalent)
Royal Brunei Air Force											No insignia
Royal Brunei Air Force	Pegawai waran 1 (udara)		Pegawai waran 2 (udara)	Staf sarjan (udara)		Sarjan (udara)		Koperal (udara)		Lans koperal (udara)	Prebet/Soldadu (udara)
Cameroon Air Force														No insignia
Cameroon Air Force	Adjudant-chef		Adjudant			Sergent-chef	Sergent	Caporal-chef		Caporal	Soldat première			Soldat
Royal Canadian Air Force
Royal Canadian Air Force	Chief warrant officer		Master warrant officer	Warrant officer		Sergeant		Master corporal		Corporal	Aviator (trained)			Aviator (basic)
Royal Canadian Air Force	Adjudant(e)-chef		Adjudant(e)-maître	Adjudant(e)		Sergent(e)		Caporal(e)-chef		Caporal(e)	Aviateur (formé)/ Aviatrice (formée)			Aviateur (confirmé)/ Aviatrice (confirmée)
Cyprus Air Forces														Arm/corps insignia only
Cyprus Air Forces	Ανθυπασπιστής; Anthypaspistís		Αρχισμηνίας; Archisminías	Επισμηνίας; Episminías		Σμηνίας; Sminías		Υποσμηνίας; Yposminías		Ανθυποσμηνίας; Anthyposminías				Σμηνίτης; Sminítis
Fiji	No air force
Gabonese Air Force
Gabonese Air Force	Adjudant-chef major	Adjudant-chef	Adjudant			Sergent-chef	Sergent	Caporal-chef		Caporal	Soldat première			Soldat
Ghana Air Force														No insignia
Ghana Air Force	Warrant officer class I		Warrant officer class II	Flight sergeant		Sergeant		Corporal			Leading aircraftsman			Aircraftsman
Grenada	No air force
Guyana Air Corps											No insignia
Guyana Air Corps	Warrant officer class 1		Warrant officer class 2	Staff sergeant		Sergeant		Corporal		Lance corporal	Private (or equivalent)
Indian Air Force														No insignia
Indian Air Force	Master warrant officer मास्टर वारंट अफसर		Warrant officer वारंट अफसर	Junior warrant officer जूनियर वारंट अफसर		Sergeant सार्जेंट		Corporal कॉरपोरल			Leading aircraftsman लीडिंग एयरक्राफ्ट्समैन			Aircraftsman एयरक्राफ्ट्समैन
Rank group	Senior NCOs							Junior NCOs			Enlisted
Jamaican Air Wing											No insignia
Jamaican Air Wing	Warrant officer class 1		Warrant officer class 2	Staff sergeant		Sergeant		Corporal		Lance corporal	Private (or equivalent)
Kenya Air Force											No insignia
Kenya Air Force	Warrant officer class 1		Warrant officer class 2	Senior sergeant		Sergeant		Corporal		Lance corporal	Aircraftman
Kiribati	No air force
Lesotho Air Squadron											No insignia
Lesotho Air Squadron	Warrant officer class 1		Warrant officer class 2	Staff sergeant		Sergeant		Corporal		Lance corporal	Private (or equivalent)
Malawi Air Force											No insignia
Malawi Air Force	Warrant Officer Class 1		Warrant Officer Class 2	Staff Sergeant		Sergeant		Corporal		Lance Corporal	Private (or equivalent)
Royal Malaysian Air Force											No insignia			No insignia
Royal Malaysian Air Force	Pegawai Waran Udara I		Pegawai Waran Udara II	Flait Sarjan		Sarjan Udara		Koperal Udara		Laskar Udara Kanan	Laskar Udara I			Laskar Udara II	Perajurit Muda
Mauritius	No air force
Mozambique Air Force
Mozambique Air Force				Intendente		Primeiro-sargento	Segundo-sargento	Terceiro-sargento		Cabo	Primeiro soldado
Namibian Air Force											No insignia
Namibian Air Force	Warrant officer class 1		Warrant officer class 2	Flight sergeant		Sergeant		Aircraftman		Leading aircraftman	Private (or equivalent)
Nauru	No air force
Royal New Zealand Air Force
Royal New Zealand Air Force	Warrant Officer			Flight Sergeant		Sergeant		Corporal			Leading Aircraftman			Aircraftman
Nigerian Air Force											No insignia
Nigerian Air Force	Air warrant officer	Master warrant officer	Warrant officer	Flight sergeant		Sergeant		Corporal		Lance corporal	Aircraftman
Pakistan Air Force
Pakistan Air Force	Chief warrant officer		Warrant officer	Assistant warrant officer		Senior technician		Corporal technician		Junior technician	Senior aircraftman		Leading aircraftman	Aircraftman
Papua New Guinea Air Element											No insignia
Papua New Guinea Air Element	Warrant Officer Class 1		Warrant Officer Class 2	Staff Sergeant		Sergeant		Corporal		Lance Corporal	Private
Rwandan Air Force														No insignia
Rwandan Air Force	Warrant officer I		Warrant officer II	Sergeant major		Staff sergeant	Sergeant			Corporal				Private
Saint Kitts and Nevis	No air force
Saint Lucia	No air force
Saint Vincent and the Grenadines	No air force
Samoa	No air force
Seychelles Air Force
Seychelles Air Force	Warrant officer class 1		Warrant officer class 2	Staff sergeant		Sergeant		Corporal		Lance corporal	Private (or equivalent)
Sierra Leone	No air force
Republic of Singapore Air Force														No insignia	No insignia
Republic of Singapore Air Force	Master sergeant		Staff sergeant	First sergeant		Second sergeant	Third sergeant	Corporal first class	Corporal	Lance corporal	Private first class			Private	Recruit
Solomon Islands	No air force
South African Air Force														No insignia
South African Air Force	Warrant officer class 1		Warrant officer class 2	Flight sergeant		Sergeant		Corporal		Lance corporal				Aircraftman
Sri Lanka Air Force														No insignia
Sri Lanka Air Force	Master warrant officer		Warrant officer	Flight sergeant		Sergeant		Corporal			Leading aircraftman			Aircraftman
(Eswatini) Swaziland	No air force
Tanzania Air Force											No insignia
Tanzania Air Force	Afisa mteule daraja la kwanza		Afisa mteule daraja la pili	Sajinitaji		Sajenti		Koplo		Koplo usu	Mtu ndege
(Togo) Togolese Air Force														No insignia
(Togo) Togolese Air Force	Major	Adjudant-chef	Adjudant			Sergent-chef	Sergent	Caporal-chef		Caporal	Soldat de 1^{ère} classe			Soldat de 2^{ème} classe
Trinidad and Tobago Air Guard
Trinidad and Tobago Air Guard	Warrant officer I		Warrant officer II			Sergeant		Corporal			Senior technician		Senior aircraftman	Junior aircraftman/ Junior technician
Tuvalu	No air force
Royal Air Force														No insignia
Royal Air Force	Warrant officer			Flight sergeant	Chief technician	Sergeant		Corporal		Lance corporal (RAF Regiment only)	Air specialist (class 1) technician	Air specialist (class 1)	Air specialist (class 2)	Air recruit
Royal Air Force (Aircrew)
Royal Air Force (Aircrew)	Master aircrew			Flight sergeant aircrew		Sergeant aircrew
Vanuatu	No air force
Zambian Air Force											No insignia
Zambian Air Force	Warrant officer class 1		Warrant officer class 2	Staff sergeant		Sergeant		Corporal		Lance corporal	Private (or equivalent)
Rank group	Senior NCOs							Junior NCOs			Enlisted

== See also ==
- Comparative air force officer ranks of the Commonwealth
- Ranks and insignia of NATO air forces officers
