= Comparison of United Kingdom and United States military ranks =

== UK and US officer ranks compared ==
Rank group	General / flag officers					Senior officers			Junior officers
NATO code	OF-10	OF-9	OF-8	OF-7	OF-6	OF-5	OF-4	OF-3	OF-2	OF-1
British Army
British Army	Field marshal	General	Lieutenant-general	Major-general	Brigadier	Colonel	Lieutenant colonel	Major	Captain	Lieutenant	Second lieutenant
United States Army
United States Army	General of the Army	General	Lieutenant general	Major general	Brigadier general	Colonel	Lieutenant colonel	Major	Captain	First lieutenant	Second lieutenant
Rank group	General / flag officers					Senior officers			Junior officers
NATO code	OF-10	OF-9	OF-8	OF-7	OF-6	OF-5	OF-4	OF-3	OF-2	OF-1
Royal Navy
Royal Navy	Admiral of the Fleet	Admiral	Vice admiral	Rear admiral	Commodore	Captain	Commander	Lieutenant commander	Lieutenant	Sub lieutenant	Midshipman
United States Navy
United States Navy	Fleet admiral	Admiral	Vice admiral	Rear admiral	Rear admiral (lower half)	Captain	Commander	Lieutenant commander	Lieutenant	Lieutenant (junior grade)	Ensign
United States Coast Guard
United States Coast Guard		Admiral	Vice admiral	Rear admiral	Rear admiral (lower half)	Captain	Commander	Lieutenant commander	Lieutenant	Lieutenant (junior grade)	Ensign
Rank group	General / flag officers					Senior officers			Junior officers
NATO code	OF-10	OF-9	OF-8	OF-7	OF-6	OF-5	OF-4	OF-3	OF-2	OF-1
Royal Marines
Royal Marines		General	Lieutenant-general	Major-general	Brigadier	Colonel	Lieutenant colonel	Major	Captain	Lieutenant	Second lieutenant
United States Marine Corps
United States Marine Corps		General	Lieutenant general	Major general	Brigadier general	Colonel	Lieutenant colonel	Major	Captain	First lieutenant	Second lieutenant
Rank group	General / flag officers					Senior officers			Junior officers
NATO code	OF-10	OF-9	OF-8	OF-7	OF-6	OF-5	OF-4	OF-3	OF-2	OF-1
Royal Air Force
Royal Air Force	Marshal of the RAF	Air chief marshal	Air marshal	Air vice-marshal	Air commodore	Group captain	Wing commander	Squadron leader	Flight lieutenant	Flying officer	Pilot officer /acting pilot officer
United States Air Force
United States Air Force	General of the Air Force	General	Lieutenant general	Major general	Brigadier general	Colonel	Lieutenant colonel	Major	Captain	First lieutenant	Second lieutenant
United States Space Force
United States Space Force		General	Lieutenant general	Major general	Brigadier general	Colonel	Lieutenant colonel	Major	Captain	First lieutenant	Second lieutenant
NATO code	OF-10	OF-9	OF-8	OF-7	OF-6	OF-5	OF-4	OF-3	OF-2	OF-1

Not listed are U.S. warrant officers. A warrant officer is an officer who can and does command, carry out military justice actions and sits on both selection and promotion boards. A US warrant officer is a single-track specialty officer, initially appointed by their respective service secretary; he/she receives a commission upon promotion to chief warrant officer two (CW2).

In the UK the separation between "other" ranks and "officer" ranks can, on occasion, become permeable. Within the British armed services, both Sir Fitzroy Maclean and Enoch Powell are examples of, rare, rapid career progression with the British army, both rising from the rank of private to brigadier during World War II. In the US military such advancement is not uncommon, all five services maintaining programs that select promising enlisted men and women for the commissioned ranks.

=== Notes to tables above ===
- In the US Army, the rank of brigadier general is considered to be the lowest general officer rank, whilst in the British Army and Royal Marines, the equivalent rank of brigadier is considered to be the highest field officer rank. A brigadier-general rank did exist in the British Army until the 1740s, and was then an appointment (also in the Royal Marines from 1913) until it was abolished in 1921.
- The Royal Marines rank alongside their army equivalents. However, when on the books of any HM Ship or Naval Establishment, Royal Marines are subject to the Naval Discipline Act 1957. In those circumstances, many officer ranks in the Royal Marines formerly enjoyed greater status. Second lieutenants were equivalent to sub lieutenants and ranks from lieutenant to major were considered equivalent to one rank higher (OF-2 to OF-4). Lieutenant colonels were considered equivalent to RN captains with less than six years in the rank, and colonels were equivalent to captains with more than six years seniority. Higher ranks followed the equivalence on the table above. This state of affairs ended on 1 July 1999, when Royal Marine officer ranks were fully aligned with those of the army.
- RAF-style ranks are also used by the Royal Australian Air Force, Royal New Zealand Air Force, Nigerian Air Force, Indian Air Force, Pakistan Air Force, Bangladesh Air Force, Hellenic Air Force, Egyptian Air Force, Trinidad and Tobago Air Guard, Royal Air Force of Oman and Sri Lanka Air Force. The Ghana Air Force and Air Force of Zimbabwe (previously Royal Rhodesian Air Force) also use the same basic system, but replace pilot officer and flying officer with air sub lieutenant and air lieutenant. The Royal Thai Air Force uses the RAF ranks also. The Royal Canadian Air Force and Royal Malaysian Air Force also previously used the system.
- The U.S. military usually uses O-1 to O-10 to denote officers, and not the NATO codes of OF-1 to OF-10 in which all subaltern officers are classed as OF-1 (O-1 and O-2 in US). O-11 is sometimes used for the U.S. OF-10 ranks, but this is not official.
- OF-10 ranks in the United States can only be attained during wartime; the last five-star officer died in 1981. This is also now generally the case in the UK, although provision is made to award them under special circumstances in peacetime (No promotion to these ranks has been made since they were generally suspended in 1997, with the exception of the honorary promotion of Lord Boyce to Admiral of the Fleet in the Queen's 2014 birthday honours.) Captain-General Royal Marines is a ceremonial position, usually held by a member of the royal family (such as Prince Harry, Duke of Sussex until 2021). There is no field marshal rank in the Royal Marines, although Royal Marine officers may reach full general rank.
- Due to their modern-day size, the ranks of general and lieutenant-general are not generally used within 3 Commando Brigade or the main Royal Marines, however, the position of commandant general is held by a general. Royal Marines officers may hold the rank of lieutenant-general, serving in Ministry of Defence or joint forces positions. Royal Marine officers may reach the full rank of general, for example General Gordon Messenger.
- At various times (1775-1981) the O-7 rank in the USN has been called Commodore and briefly once, Commodore Admiral. Then changed to Rear Admiral lower half due to Captains and Commanders that commanded more than 1 ship or squadrons given the title, but not rank, of Commodore.
- The rank of Ensign is not used in the Royal Marines. Royal Marines officers join as second lieutenants; after two years of service, provided that Phase 2 training has been successfully completed, they are promoted to the rank of lieutenant (if under 21 at the time of joining) or captain (if 21 or older at the time of joining).
- The rank of Ensign is no longer used in the Royal Navy. All officers now join BRNC Dartmouth as midshipmen once more, unless they have previously served in the ranks ((senior) upper yardsmen) but use the non-substantive rank of officer cadet (OCdt) during the first term of their training. In the second term, they are acting Midshipmen, before commissioning as Midshipmen. They promote to Sub-lieutenants after one-year of service.
- The name for Officers in training for the US Navy vary depending on the particular officer commissioning program. Naval Academy, Merchant Marine Academy and NROTC are midshipmen (MIDN); United States Coast Guard Academy are cadets; U.S. Navy seaman-to-admiral 21 (STA-21) and Officer Candidate School are officer candidates (OC).

== US "Enlisted" and UK "Other ranks" compared ==
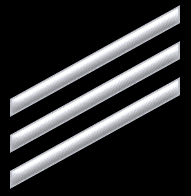
NATO code	OR-9			OR-8		OR-7		OR-6	OR-5	OR-4		OR-3	OR-2			OR-1
British Army													No insignia
British Army	Warrant officer class 1			Warrant officer class 2		Staff/colour sergeant		Sergeant		Corporal		Lance corporal	Private (or equivalent)
United States Army																No insignia
United States Army	Command sergeant major		Sergeant major	First sergeant	Master sergeant	Sergeant first class		Staff sergeant	Sergeant	Corporal	Specialist	Private first class	Private			Private
NATO code	OR-9			OR-8		OR-7		OR-6	OR-5	OR-4		OR-3	OR-2			OR-1
Royal Navy
Royal Navy	Warrant officer class 1			Warrant officer class 2		Chief petty officer		Petty officer		Leading rate			Able rate
United States Navy																No insignia
United States Navy	Command master chief petty officer		Master chief petty officer	Command senior chief petty officer	Senior chief petty officer	Chief petty officer		Petty officer first class	Petty officer second class	Petty officer third class		Seaman	Seaman apprentice			Seaman recruit
NATO code	OR-9			OR-8		OR-7		OR-6	OR-5	OR-4		OR-3	OR-2			OR-1
Royal Marines													No insignia
Royal Marines	Warrant officer class 1			Warrant officer class 2		Colour sergeant		Sergeant		Corporal		Lance corporal	Marine
United States Marine Corps																No insignia
United States Marine Corps	Sergeant major		Master gunnery sergeant	First sergeant	Master sergeant	Gunnery sergeant		Staff sergeant	Sergeant	Corporal		Lance corporal	Private first class			Private
NATO code	OR-9			OR-8		OR-7		OR-6	OR-5	OR-4		OR-3	OR-2			OR-1
Royal Air Force																No insignia
Royal Air Force	Warrant officer					Flight sergeant	Chief technician	Sergeant		Corporal		Lance corporal (RAF Regiment only)	Air specialist (class 1) technician	Air specialist (class 1)	Air specialist (class 2)	Air recruit
Royal Air Force (Aircrew)
Royal Air Force (Aircrew)	Master aircrew					Flight sergeant aircrew		Sergeant aircrew
United States Air Force																No insignia
United States Air Force	Command chief master sergeant	First sergeant	Chief master sergeant	First sergeant	Senior master sergeant	First sergeant	Master sergeant	Technical sergeant	Staff sergeant	Senior airman		Airman first class	Airman			Airman basic
United States Space Force
United States Space Force	Chief master sergeant			Senior master sergeant		Master sergeant		Technical sergeant	Sergeant	Specialist 4		Specialist 3	Specialist 2			Specialist 1
NATO code	OR-9			OR-8		OR-7		OR-6	OR-5	OR-4		OR-3	OR-2			OR-1

Notes on comparison:

- In the US Army OR-1 to OR-4 (specialist) are junior enlisted, OR-4 (corporal) to OR-6 are junior non-commissioned officers (NCOs), and OR-7 to OR-9 are senior non-commissioned officers (SNCOs).
- In the USAF OR-1 to OR-4 are junior enlisted, OR-5 to OR-6 are NCOs, and OR-7 to OR-9 are SNCOs.
- In the USMC, OR-1 to OR-3 are junior enlisted, OR-4 to OR-5 are NCOs, and OR-6 to OR-9 are staff non-commissioned officers.
- In the US Navy and Coast Guard, OR-1 to OR-3 or "nonrated (wo)men" are junior enlisted, OR-4 to OR-6 or petty officers are NCOs, and OR-7 to OR-9 or chief petty officers are SNCOs.
- In the British Army, RAF and Royal Navy, OR-1 to OR-2 are junior enlisted, OR-3 to OR-4 are Junior NCO's, and OR-5 to OR-9 are Senior NCO's
- Generally speaking, the RN assumes a rank up despite the NATO code remaining the same. For example, a LH is more practically comparable to a PO2 or PO1 in the USN.
- While in the British Army a lance corporal is the next rank up from a private, unlike in the US Army they are considered junior NCOs, and hold a similar command appointment to a US Army sergeant. Because of this it is not unheard of for lance corporals to be given US Army sergeant rank insignia when serving with US forces.
- While there are different pay-grades for privates (and other enlisted ranks) in the British Army, these are tied to job-role (MOS) rather than time in service. As such there is no promotion from a class 4 private to a class 3 private, nor are there differing badges of rank.
- In the RAF, technical and music trades use the rank Chief Technician (Chf Tech) as the OR-7 rank, with FSs in these trades being paid as, and having the authority of, an OR-8.

Addendum: In the US Army (but not the USMC) the term "trooper/(troop)" may be used informally for lower enlisted in cavalry, scout, airborne, air assault, Ranger, and Special Forces units, along with the occasional use for any soldier, particularly dismounted infantry. The specific definition of "troop" is a company-sized unit of cavalry, organizationally equivalent to "battery" in artillery units.

=== Notes to tables above ===
- A warrant officer in UK service is a senior non-commissioned rank not comparable to the various grades of warrant officer in the US, although holding the King's Warrant and with certain privileges similar to those of officers. In the Army and Royal Marines, they are referred to by their appointment, of which there are many (for example, regimental sergeant major is a WO1 appointment). The US rank is held by single-track career specialists (ranking between enlisted ranks and 2nd lieutenant) and has no NATO equivalent. An RN warrant officer class 1 incorporated the former rank of fleet chief petty officer. There are now executive warrant officers, denoting the senior WO1s on ships and shore establishments. The Command Warrant Officers have been removed under the Royal Navy Command Transformation Programme. The most senior Royal Navy WO1 is the Warrant Officer of the Naval Service (WONS) The rating of WO2 in the Royal Navy was removed in 2014 but reinstated in 2021. The recent senior Warrant Officer of the British Army is the "Army Sergeant Major". In November 2018, the highest Warrant Officer/OR position was created, namely the Senior Enlisted Advisor to the Chiefs of Staff Committee.
- RAF Flight Sergeants: Although technically equivalent to British Army Staff Sergeant this does not equate to time served or experience since the RAF does not have the rank of WO2.
- The RN created the rate of Warrant Officer Class 2 on 1 April 2004. Previously, there was a rate of Charge Chief Petty Officer, who usually ranked as OR-7, although above other CPOs. A Charge Chief Artificer (a highly qualified technical CCPO) could be given a NATO OR-8 status, but still ranked below WO2 in the Army and Royal Marines. On the creation of WO2, all CCPOs were upgraded to this rate.
- In the US "OR #" system, NCOs are from OR4 onwards hence the equivalents in rank name do not tie in exactly. In the US Army a Corporal is considered an NCO, but a Specialist is not.
- British Sergeants/Petty Officers are seen as equal to E5 and E6 although Corporals as well as Sergeants may be appointed to an official OR-5 (i.e. E-5) military role as is suited to the particular situation.
- From April 1, 1999, the Able Rating and Ordinary Rating of the Royal Navy merged and called Able Rating, the grades of Marine 1st Class and Marine 2nd Class of the Royal Marines merged, and Junior Rating and Junior Marine were abolished.
- Technical trades and musicians only. Promotion to the rank of Junior Technician ceased in 2005, only to be replaced by Senior Aircraftman (Technician) a short time later.
- The most senior WO1s are, in descending order, the Army Sergeant Major, the Conductors (Cdr) of the Royal Logistic Corps, the Royal Artillery Sergeant Major, Royal Artillery, the Academy Sergeant Major (AcSM), and the Garrison Sergeant Major (GSM) of the London District.
- British army WO1 includes Regimental Sergeant Major (RSM), Garrison Sergeant Major (GSM), and Household Cavalry Regimental Corporal Major (RCM). These appointments are similar in function to the equivalent US rank indicated, but are equal in rank to other WO1 appointments.
- British army WO2 includes Company Sergeant Major (CSM), Squadron Sergeant Major (SSM), Royal Artillery Battery Sergeant Major (BSM), Household Cavalry Squadron Corporal Major (SCM), and Band Sergeant Major. These appointments are similar in function to the equivalent US rank indicated, but are equal in rank to other WO2 appointments.
- British army Staff Sergeants can also hold other appointments, such as Company Quartermaster Sergeant.
- There are no Sergeant ranks or appointments (Sergeant, Colour Sergeant, and Sergeants Major) in the Household Cavalry, having different grades of Corporal instead, such as Corporal of Horse or Staff Corporal.
- There are no Corporals or Lance Corporals in the Royal Artillery, but equivalent ranks exist in the form of Bombardier and Lance Bombardier.
- On 1 April 2010, the RAF Regiment introduced the rank of Lance Corporal for current SACs who undertake the role of section second-in-command/fire team commander. This gives them more authority on the ground, as well as a better pay band. The move to introduce the rank of lance corporal was taken as, due to the RAF Regiments role as specialist infantry, many highly qualified and experienced airmen were tasked with acting as section second-in-command on joint operations with army, Royal Marine and foreign units. The introduction of L/Cpl rank put this on a more formal footing, and eased the minds of many enlisted soldiers from other units who were unhappy being commanded by individuals they perceived as no higher ranked than themselves.
- In the Brigade of Guards, on promotion to corporal, soldiers are appointed and referred to as Lance Sergeants.
- In The Rifles, every Sergeant rank or appointment (Sergeant, Colour Sergeant, and Sergeants Major) is spelled using the archaic spelling, "Serjeant".
- The alternatives to the rank of Private in the British Army and Royal Marines are as follows:
  - Marine (Mne) in the Royal Marines;
  - Air Trooper (ATpr) in the Army Air Corps;
  - Gunner (Gnr) in the Royal Artillery and Royal Horse Artillery;
  - Highlander (Hdr) in The Highlanders (Seaforth, Gordons and Camerons);
  - Ranger (Rgr) in the Royal Irish Regiment;
  - Sapper (Spr) in the Royal Engineers;
  - Trooper (Tpr) in the Household Cavalry, Royal Armoured Corps regiments, Honourable Artillery Company and Special Air Service;
  - Craftsman (Cfn) in the Royal Electrical and Mechanical Engineers;
  - Guardsman (Gdn) in Foot Guards regiments;
  - Kingsman (Kgn) in the Duke of Lancaster's Regiment;
  - Rifleman (Rfn) in The Rifles;
  - Signaller (Sig) in the Royal Corps of Signals;
  - Fusilier (Fus) in the Royal Regiment of Fusiliers and Royal Highland Fusiliers;
  - Musician (Mus) in the Royal Corps of Army Music;
  - Where appropriate: Drummer (Dmr), Trumpeter (Tptr), Bugler, or Piper (Ppr).
- In the US Army, first sergeant is considered senior to and promoted laterally from master sergeant when assigned to a first sergeant billet, typically the senior NCO in a company (troop, battery)-sized unit. Upon reassignment a 1SG reverts to his previous rank of MSG. In the USMC the OR-8 ranks are equivalent but on separate career tracks as are the OR-9 ranks, i.e. a gunnery sergeant (OR-7) is promoted to either first sergeant or master sergeant depending on his indicated preference for a command/senior enlisted advisor billet or a technical specialty. A first sergeant is promoted to sergeant major and a master sergeant to master gunnery sergeant.
- The alternatives to the rank of seaman in the US Navy are as follows:
  - Fireman (FN) in engineering;
  - Airman (AN) in aviation;
  - Hospitalman (HN) for medical corpsmen;
  - Constructionman (CN) in Construction Battalions (Seabees).
  - The former rate of Dentalman (DN) was merged into Hospitalman in 2005.
  - Also Fireman Apprentice (FA), Airman Apprentice (AA), Hospitalman Apprentice (HA), Constructionman Apprentice (CA).
  - Also Fireman Recruit (FR), Airman Recruit (AR), Hospitalman Recruit (HR), Constructionman Recruit (CR).
- The senior most NCO in each Service has a unique title, and in the US Services a unique set of rank/rating insignia.

== See also ==
- List of comparative military ranks
- Ranks and insignia of NATO
- British Army officer rank insignia
- British Army other ranks rank insignia
- U.S. Army officer rank insignia
- U.S. Army enlisted rank insignia
- Military rank
