= Comparative air force enlisted ranks of Anglophone countries =

Rank comparison chart of Non-commissioned officer and enlisted ranks for air forces of Anglophone states.

== Officers ==
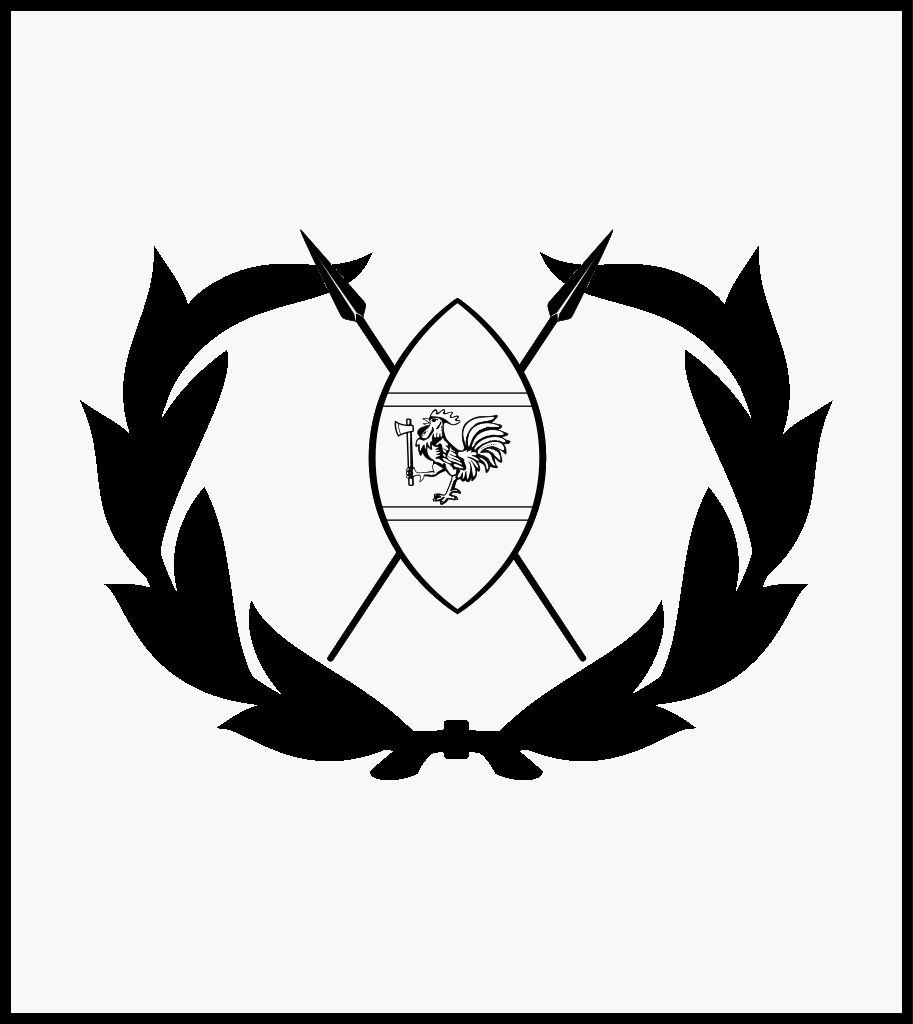
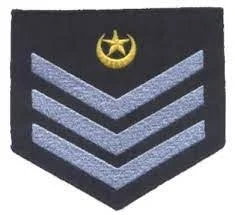
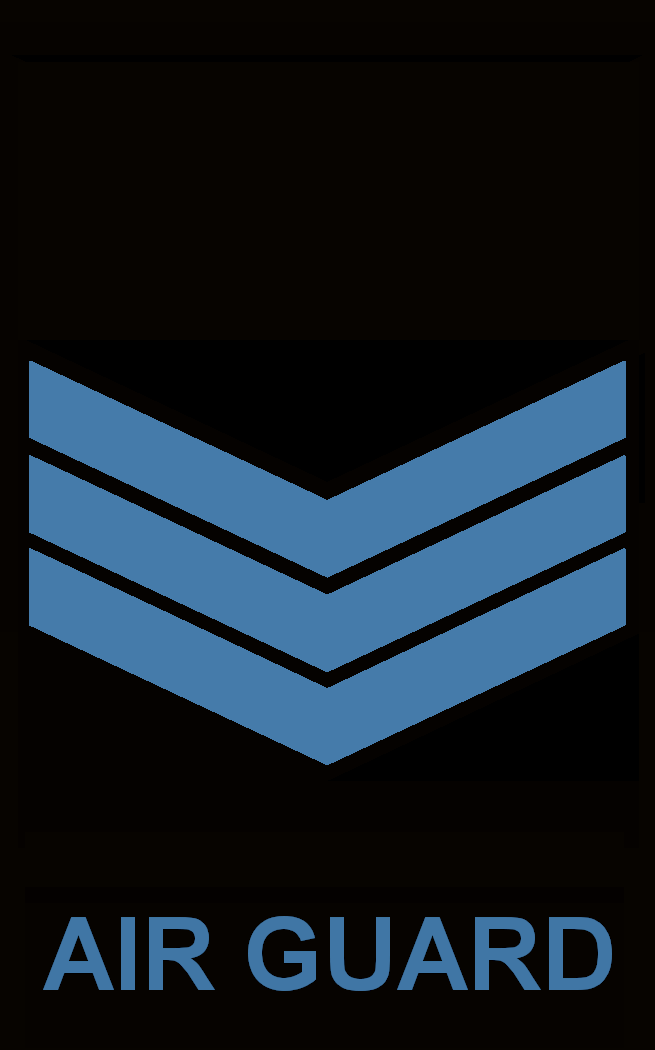
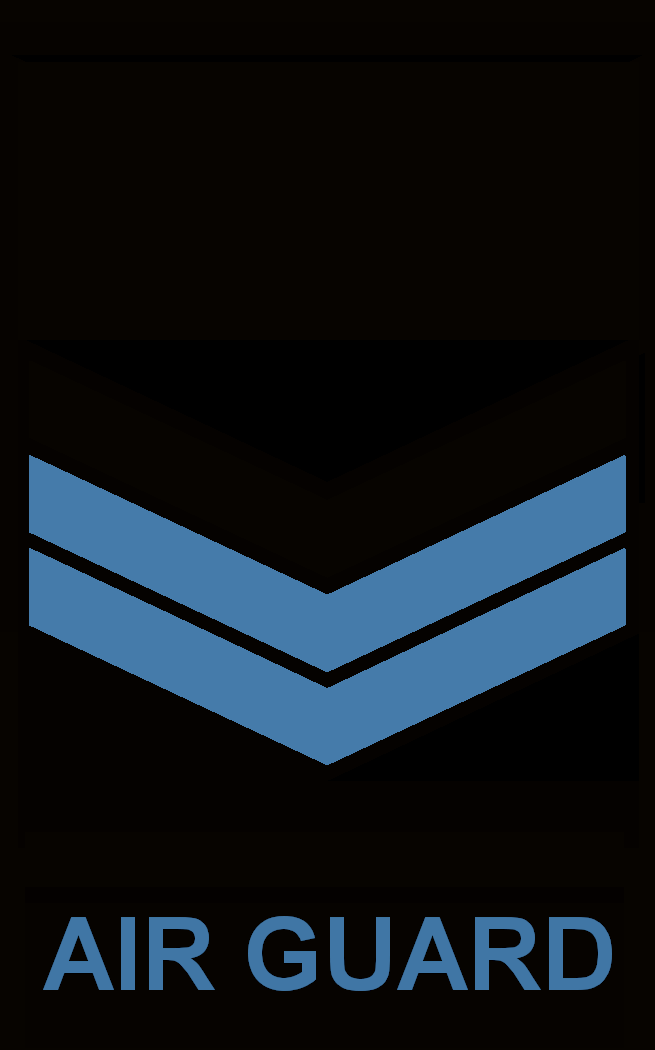
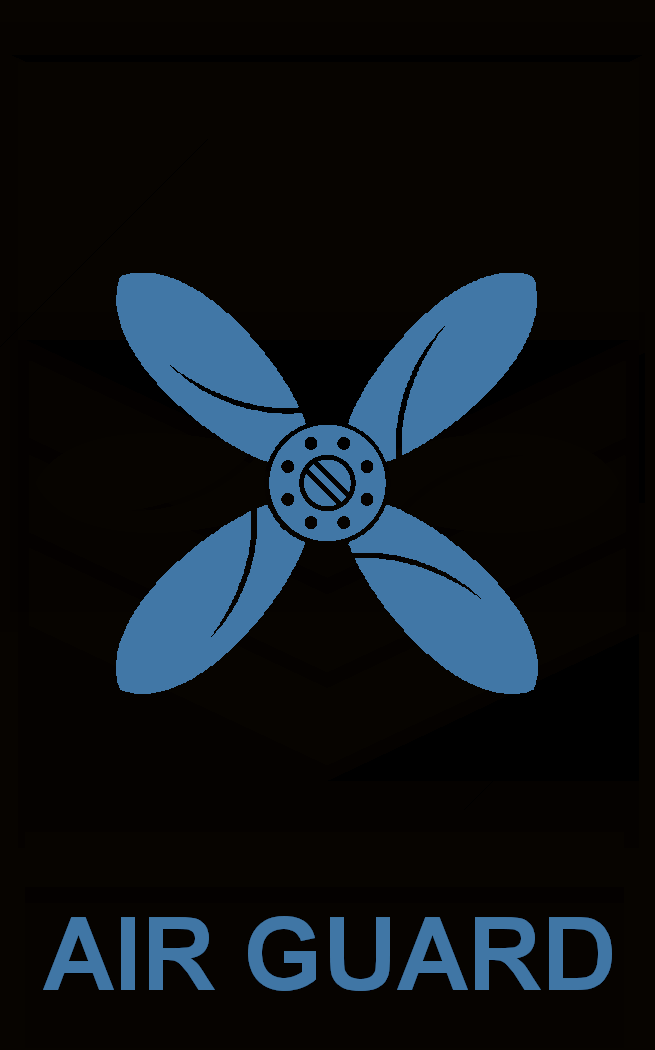
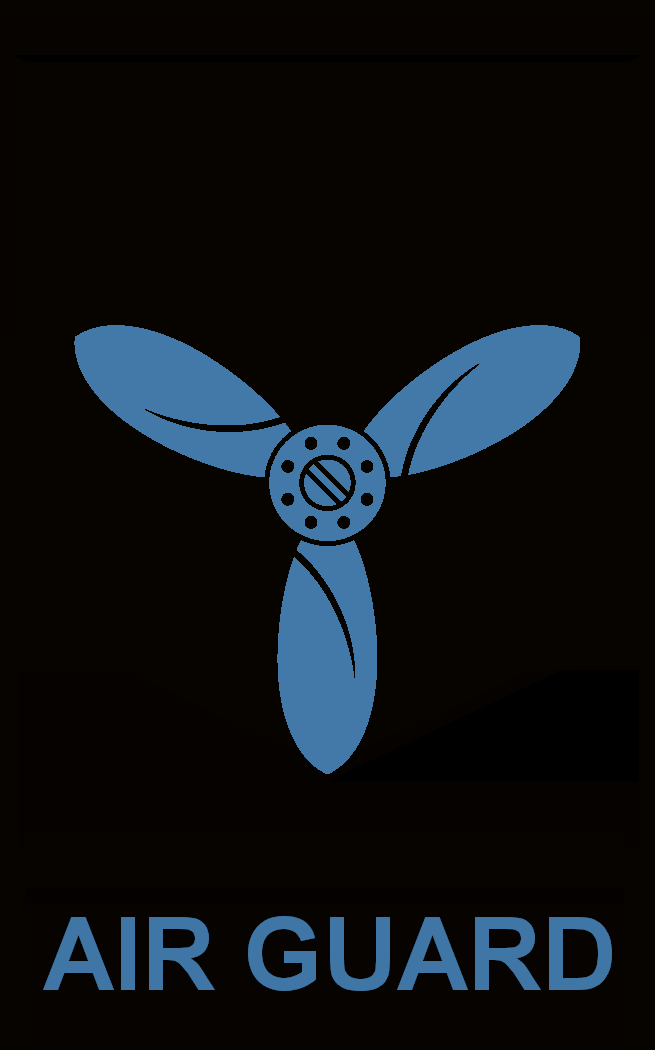
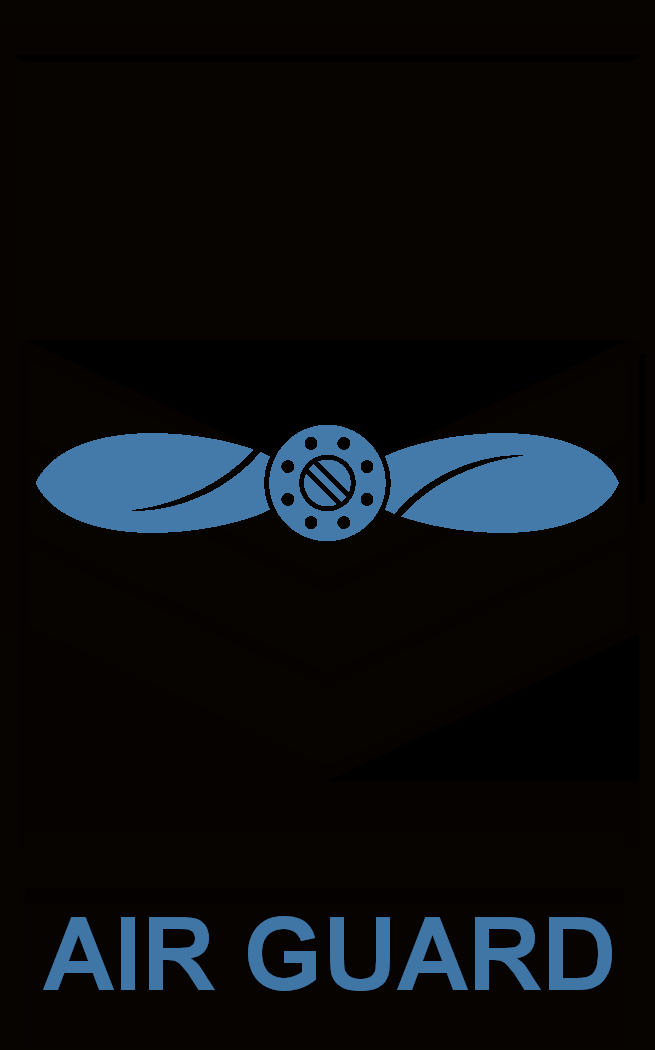
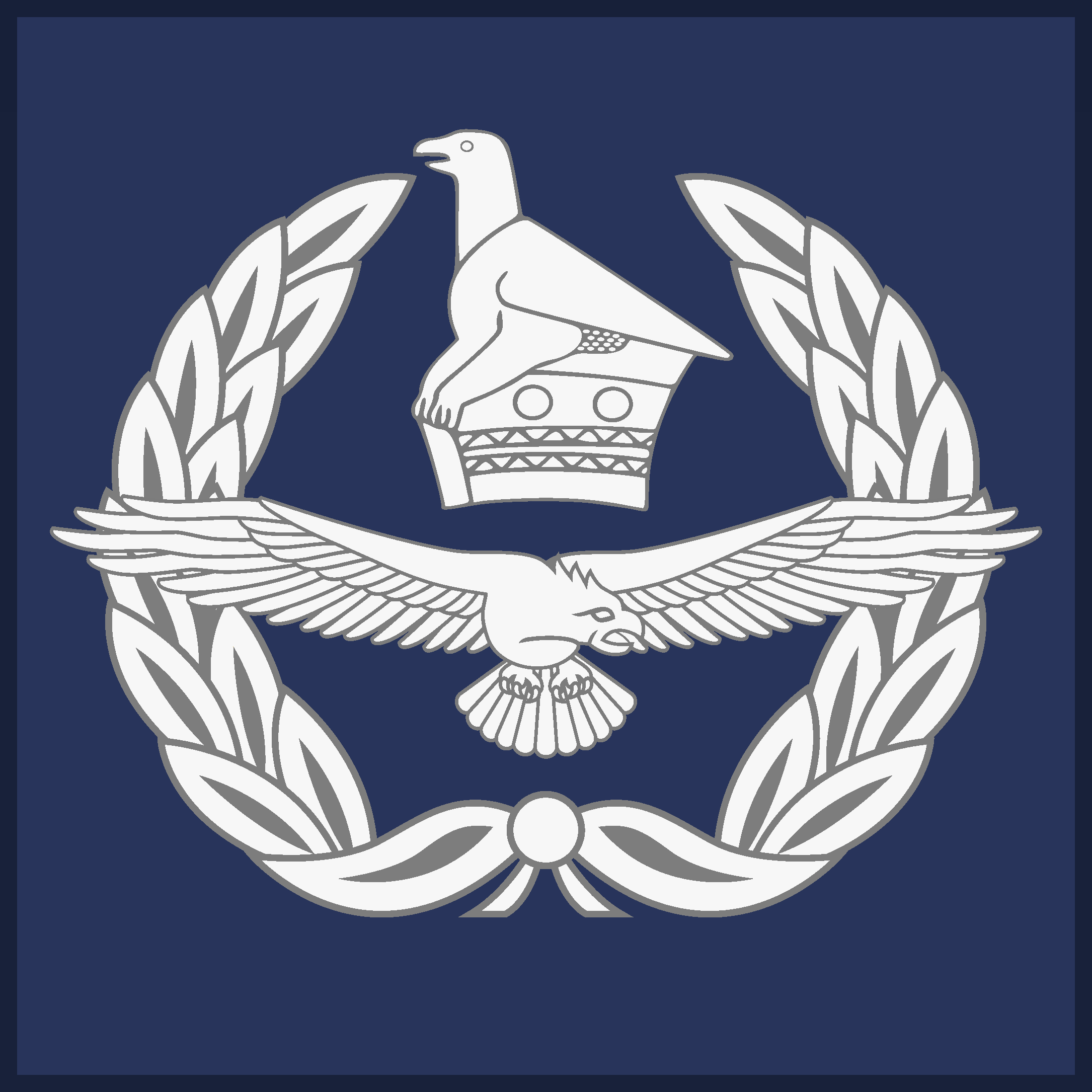
Rank group	Senior NCOs										Junior NCOs			Enlisted
Antigua and Barbuda	No air force
Royal Australian Air Force
Royal Australian Air Force	Warrant officer			Flight sergeant				Sergeant			Corporal			Leading aircraftman/ aircraftwoman			Aircraftman/ aircraftwoman
(The Bahamas) Bahamas	No air force
Belize Defence Force Air Wing														No insignia
Belize Defence Force Air Wing	Warrant officer class 1			Warrant officer class 2		Staff sergeant		Sergeant			Corporal		Lance corporal	Private (or equivalent)
Botswana Defence Force Air Wing																	No insignia
Botswana Defence Force Air Wing	Warrant officer class 1			Warrant officer class 2		Staff sergeant		Sergeant			Corporal		Lance corporal				Private (or equivalent)
Burundi	No air force
Cameroon Air Force																	No insignia
Cameroon Air Force	Adjudant-chef			Adjudant				Sergent-chef		Sergent	Caporal-chef		Caporal	Soldat première			Soldat
Royal Canadian Air Force																	No insignia
Royal Canadian Air Force	Chief warrant officer			Master warrant officer		Warrant officer		Sergeant			Master corporal		Corporal	Aviator (trained)			Aviator (basic)
Royal Canadian Air Force	Adjudant(e)-chef			Adjudant(e)-maître		Adjudant(e)		Sergent(e)			Caporal(e)-chef		Caporal(e)	Aviateur (formé)/ Aviatrice (formée)			Aviateur (confirmé)/ Aviatrice (confirmée)
Dominica	No air force
Fiji	No air force
(The Gambia) Gambia	No air force
Ghana Air Force																	No insignia
Ghana Air Force	Warrant officer class I			Warrant officer class II		Flight sergeant		Sergeant			Corporal			Leading aircraftsman			Aircraftsman
Grenada	No air force
Guyana Air Corps														No insignia
Guyana Air Corps	Warrant officer class 1			Warrant officer class 2		Staff sergeant		Sergeant			Corporal		Lance corporal	Private (or equivalent)
Haitian Aviation Corps
Indian Air Force																	No insignia
Indian Air Force	Master warrant officer मास्टर वारंट अफसर			Warrant officer वारंट अफसर		Junior warrant officer जूनियर वारंट अफसर		Sergeant सार्जेंट			Corporal कॉरपोरल			Leading aircraftsman लीडिंग एयरक्राफ्ट्समैन			Aircraftsman एयरक्राफ्ट्समैन
Irish Air Corps																		No insignia
Irish Air Corps	Regimental sergeant major Maor-sáirsint reisiminte			Regimental quartermaster sergeant Ceathrúsháirsint reisiminte		Flight sergeant Sáirsint eitleoige		Flight quartermaster sergeant Ceathrúsháirsint eitleoige		Sergeant; Sáirsint	Corporal; Ceannaire		Airman 3 star Eitleoir, 3 réalta	Airman 2 Star; Eitleoir, 2 réalta			Apprentice; Printíseach	Recruit; Earcach
Jamaican Air Wing														No insignia
Jamaican Air Wing	Warrant officer class 1			Warrant officer class 2		Staff sergeant		Sergeant			Corporal		Lance corporal	Private (or equivalent)
Kenya Air Force														No insignia
Kenya Air Force	Warrant officer class 1			Warrant officer class 2		Senior sergeant		Sergeant			Corporal		Lance corporal	Aircraftman
Kiribati	No air force
Lesotho Air Squadron														No insignia
Lesotho Air Squadron	Warrant officer class 1			Warrant officer class 2		Staff sergeant		Sergeant			Corporal		Lance corporal	Private (or equivalent)
Liberian Air Wing
Liberian Air Wing	Chief master sergeant			Master sergeant		Technical sergeant		Staff sergeant		Senior airman/woman	Airman/woman first class		Airman/woman	Airman/woman basic
Malawi Air Force														No insignia
Malawi Air Force	Warrant officer class 1			Warrant officer class 2		Staff sergeant		Sergeant			Corporal		Lance corporal	Private (or equivalent)
Malian Air Force
Malian Air Force	Major		Adjudant-chef	Adjudant				Sergent-chef		Sergent	Caporal-chef		Caporal	Soldat de première classe			Soldat
Marshall Islands	No air force
Mauritius	No air force
Federated States of Micronesia	No air force
Namibian Air Force														No insignia
Namibian Air Force	Warrant officer class 1			Warrant officer class 2		Flight sergeant		Sergeant			Aircraftman		Leading aircraftman	Private (or equivalent)
Nauru	No air force
Royal New Zealand Air Force
Royal New Zealand Air Force	Warrant Officer					Flight Sergeant		Sergeant			Corporal			Leading Aircraftman			Aircraftman
Nigerian Air Force														No insignia
Nigerian Air Force	Air warrant officer		Master warrant officer	Warrant officer		Flight sergeant		Sergeant			Corporal		Lance corporal	Aircraftman
Pakistan Air Force
Pakistan Air Force	Chief warrant officer			Warrant officer		Assistant warrant officer		Chief technician	Senior technician		Corporal technician		Junior technician	Senior aircraftman		Leading aircraftman	Aircraftman
Palau	No air force
Papua New Guinea Air Element														No insignia
Papua New Guinea Air Element	Warrant Officer Class 1			Warrant Officer Class 2		Staff Sergeant		Sergeant			Corporal		Lance Corporal	Private
Philippine Air Force
Philippine Air Force	Chief master sergeant		Senior master sergeant	Master sergeant		Technical sergeant		Staff sergeant		Sergeant	Airman first class			Airman second class			Airman
Rwandan Air Force																	No insignia
Rwandan Air Force	Warrant officer I			Warrant officer II		Sergeant major		Staff sergeant		Sergeant			Corporal				Private
Saint Kitts and Nevis	No air force
Saint Lucia	No air force
Saint Vincent and the Grenadines	No air force
Samoa	No air force
Seychelles Air Force
Seychelles Air Force	Warrant officer class 1			Warrant officer class 2		Staff sergeant		Sergeant			Corporal		Lance corporal	Private (or equivalent)
Sierra Leone	No air force
Republic of Singapore Air Force																	No insignia	No insignia
Republic of Singapore Air Force	Master sergeant			Staff sergeant		First sergeant		Second sergeant		Third sergeant	Corporal first class	Corporal	Lance corporal	Private first class			Private	Recruit
Solomon Islands	No air force
South African Air Force																	No insignia
South African Air Force	Warrant officer class 1			Warrant officer class 2		Flight sergeant		Sergeant			Corporal		Lance corporal				Airman
South Sudan Air Force
South Sudan Air Force	Regimental sergeant major			Sergeant major				Sergeant			Corporal		Lance corporal	Private
Sudanese Air Force														No insignia
Sudanese Air Force				مساعد; Mosa'id		رقيب أول; Raqib awwal		رقيب; Raqib			عريف 'arif		وكيل عريف; Wakil 'arif	جندي; Jundiun
Tanzania Air Force														No insignia
Tanzania Air Force	Afisa mteule daraja la kwanza			Afisa mteule daraja la pili		Sajinitaji		Sajenti			Koplo		Koplo usu	Mtu ndege
Trinidad and Tobago Air Guard
Trinidad and Tobago Air Guard	Warrant officer I			Warrant officer II				Sergeant			Corporal			Senior technician		Senior aircraftman	Junior aircraftman/ Junior technician
Tuvalu	No air force
Ugandan Air Force														No insignia
Ugandan Air Force	Warrant officer class 1			Warrant officer class 2		Staff sergeant		Sergeant			Corporal		Lance corporal	Private (or equivalent)
Royal Air Force																	No insignia
Royal Air Force	Warrant officer					Flight sergeant	Chief technician	Sergeant			Corporal		Lance corporal (RAF Regiment only)	Air specialist (class 1) technician	Air specialist (class 1)	Air specialist (class 2)	Air recruit
Royal Air Force (Aircrew)
Royal Air Force (Aircrew)	Master aircrew					Flight sergeant aircrew		Sergeant aircrew
United States Air Force																	No insignia
United States Air Force	Command chief master sergeant	First sergeant	Chief master sergeant	First sergeant	Senior master sergeant	First sergeant	Master sergeant	Technical sergeant		Staff sergeant	Senior airman		Airman first class	Airman			Airman basic
Vanuatu	No air force
Zambian Air Force														No insignia
Zambian Air Force	Warrant officer class 1			Warrant officer class 2		Staff sergeant		Sergeant			Corporal		Lance corporal	Private (or equivalent)
Air Force of Zimbabwe																	No insignia
Air Force of Zimbabwe	Warrant officer class 1			Master technician	Warrant officer class 2	Master sergeant	Flight sergeant	Sergeant			Corporal		Senior aircraftman	Leading aircraftman			Aircraftman
Rank group	Senior NCOs										Junior NCOs			Enlisted
