= Other ranks =

UK and Commonwealth military personnel who are not commissioned officers

Other ranks (ORs) in the Royal Marines (RM), the British Army, and the Royal Air Force (RAF), along with the navies, armies, and air forces of many other Commonwealth countries and Ireland, are those personnel who are not commissioned officers, but usually include non-commissioned officers (NCOs). In the Royal Navy (RN), these personnel are called "ratings" rather than "other ranks". "Non-commissioned member" (NCM) is the equivalent term in the Canadian Armed Forces, and "enlisted rank" is used in the United States and elsewhere.

The term "other ranks" is often considered to exclude warrant officers (WO), and occasionally in some militaries also excludes NCOs. Formally, a regiment consists of the "officers, warrant officers, non-commissioned officers, and men", or the "officers, warrant officers, and other ranks".

== British other ranks ==
NATO code	OR-9	OR-8	OR-7		OR-6	OR-5	OR-4	OR-3	OR-2			OR-1
Royal Navy
Royal Navy	Warrant officer class 1	Warrant officer class 2	Chief petty officer		Petty officer		Leading rate		Able rate
Royal Marines									No insignia
Royal Marines	Warrant officer class 1	Warrant officer class 2	Colour sergeant		Sergeant		Corporal	Lance corporal	Marine
British Army									No insignia
British Army	Warrant officer class 1	Warrant officer class 2	Staff/colour sergeant		Sergeant		Corporal	Lance corporal	Private (or equivalent)
Royal Air Force												No insignia
Royal Air Force	Warrant officer		Flight sergeant	Chief technician	Sergeant		Corporal	Lance corporal (RAF Regiment only)	Air specialist (class 1) technician	Air specialist (class 1)	Air specialist (class 2)	Air recruit
Royal Air Force (Aircrew)
Royal Air Force (Aircrew)	Master aircrew		Flight sergeant aircrew		Sergeant aircrew
NATO code	OR-9	OR-8	OR-7		OR-6	OR-5	OR-4	OR-3	OR-2			OR-1

== See also ==
- Royal Navy other rank insignia
- British Army other ranks rank insignia
- RAF other ranks
- Ranks and insignia of NATO
