= Air specialist =

Air specialist is a junior non-commissioned rank in the Royal Air Force. The rank was introduced in July 2022 and it comprises two different classes, namely Air Specialist Class 1 and Air Specialist Class 2, which were formerly designated as Senior Aircraftman and Leading Aircraftman respectively.
