= RAF rank system =

RAF rank system refers to military ranks of the Royal Air Force and the air forces of other countries, especially in the Commonwealth of Nations, which use similar systems.

For details of this system, see:

- RAF officer ranks
- RAF other ranks
