= Ranks of the RAF =

Ranks of the RAF include the following:

- RAF officer ranks, for commissioned officers
- RAF other ranks, for other (i.e. enlisted) ranks
