= Master engineer =

Master engineer may refer to:

- Master engineer (rank), a warrant officer rank in the Royal Air Force
- Mastering engineer, a technician in the music industry
