= Ranks and insignia of the other ranks of the RAF =

The term used in the Royal Air Force (RAF) to refer to all ranks below commissioned officer level is 'other ranks' (ORs). It includes warrant officers (WOs), non-commissioned officers (NCOs) and airmen.

== Ranks ==
Rank insignia of the other ranks of the Royal Air Force
Rank group	Warrant officers	Senior NCOs				Junior NCOs		Aviators			
NATO code	OR-9	OR-7		OR-6	OR-5	OR-4	OR-3	OR-2			OR-1
Insignia											No insignia
Typical appointment	Warrant officer of the Royal Air Force										
Rank	Warrant officer	Flight sergeant	Chief technician	Sergeant		Corporal	Lance corporal (RAF Regiment)	Air specialist (class 1) technician	Air specialist (class 1)	Air specialist (class 2)	Air recruit
Abbreviation	WO	FS	Chf Tech	Sgt		Cpl	LCpl	AS1(T)	AS1	AS2	AR
Aircrew insignia						No equivalent					
Rank	Master aircrew	Flight sergeant aircrew		Sergeant aircrew		No equivalent					
Abbreviation	MAcr	FSAcr		SAcr		No equivalent					

== Origins ==
Upon the formation of the Royal Air Force on 1 April 1918, rank titles and badges for ORs were adopted from the British Army, specifically the Royal Flying Corps (RFC). The RFC ranks of Flight sergeant (equivalent to Staff sergeant), Sergeant, Corporal and Air Mechanic were directly adopted. The RFC's four-bladed propeller trade classification badge above the Sergeants' and Flight Sergeants' chevrons was dropped.

To distinguish them from Army personnel, RAF personnel wore the RAF eagle on a rectangular patch below the shoulder seam on the sleeve. The RAF Eagle is depicted with its beak turned to the rear rather than the front. RAF NCOs were fond of saying that represented that their eyes were everywhere.

The trade classification of Leading Aircraftman was created on 5 April 1918 to fill a void in the Service ranks. It was granted the double-bladed propeller rank insignia of the RFC Air Mechanic 1st Class and was equivalent in rank and authority to the Army appointment of Lance-corporal. On 1 January 1919 the rank of Aircraftman replaced the ranks of Private, Air mechanic, and Clerk. Aircraftmen were nicknamed "Erks" (a corruption of the word 'Aircraft') by the senior ranks, which was preferred to 'other ranks' or 'troops'.

The rank of Master clerk was originally equivalent to Sergeant major 1st class. On 28 November 1918, the new rank of Chief master clerk was made equivalent to the rank of Sergeant major 1st class, and the old rank of Master clerk was made equivalent to the rank of Sergeant major 2nd class.

The original RAF ranks are vertically listed by seniority; the Technical ranks had precedence over the Administrative ranks, which in turn had precedence over the Service ranks. This was meant to keep non-technical NCOs from interfering with the efforts of technical and administrative NCOs. This was abolished in January 1919 and a streamlined single-column rank system was devised.

Rank group	RAF other ranks (1 April 1918)			RAF other ranks (1 January 1919)
Rank group	Technical	Administrative	Service	RAF other ranks (1 January 1919)
Senior NCOs	Chief master mechanic	Chief master clerk (Note: Renamed from Master clerk on 28 November 1918)	Sergeant major 1st class	Sergeant major 1st class
Senior NCOs	Master mechanic	Master clerk (Note: Introduced from 28 November 1918)	Sergeant major 2nd class	Sergeant major 2nd class
Senior NCOs	Chief mechanic	Flight clerk	Flight sergeant	Flight sergeant
Senior NCOs	Sergeant mechanic	Sergeant clerk	Sergeant	Sergeant
Junior NCOs	Corporal mechanic	Corporal clerk	Corporal	Corporal
Enlisted men	Air mechanic 1st class	Clerk 1st class	Leading aircraftman (Note: Introduced on 5 April 1918 for Privates 1st Class in receipt of 2 shillings or more per day)	Leading aircraftman (Note: Used a two bladed propeller badge as a trade classification but not made a rank until 1951)
Enlisted men	Air mechanic 2nd class	Clerk 2nd class	Private 1st class	Aircraftman 1st class
Enlisted men	Air mechanic 3rd class	Clerk 3rd class	Private 2nd class	Aircraftman 2nd class

== 1930–1949 ==
=== Warrant officers ===
In 1933, the ranks of Sergeant major 1st class and Sergeant major 2nd class were renamed Warrant officer class I and Warrant officer class II to put them in line with the Army. In 1939, the rank of Warrant officer class II was abolished and the rank of Warrant officer class I was renamed Warrant officer. RAF warrant officers were given equivalent status to the continuing army rank of Warrant officer class I.

=== Aircrew ===
On 1 July 1946, NCOs serving as aircrew were assigned different rank badges which distinguished them from ORs in ground trades. The new ranks were:

RAF aircrew ranks (1946–1950)
Aircrew rank	Equivalent rank	Insignia description (Note: The RAF Eagle in the insignia is properly displayed with its beak turned to the rear.)	Rank insignia
Master aircrew	Warrant officer	Wreath closed by Royal Arms and inset with an RAF Eagle within.	
Aircrew I	Flight sergeant	Crown over Wreath closed by an RAF Eagle and inset with three 6-pointed stars within.	
Aircrew II	Sergeant	Wreath closed by an RAF Eagle and inset with three 6-pointed stars within.	
Aircrew III	Corporal	Wreath closed by an RAF Eagle and inset with two 6-pointed stars within.	
Aircrew IV	Leading aircraftman	Wreath closed by an RAF Eagle and inset with one 6-pointed star within.	
Aircrew cadet	Trainee	Wreath closed by an RAF Eagle and a blank field within.	

== 1950s ==
In 1953, the crown was changed from the Tudor Crown to the Crown of St Edward, when Queen Elizabeth II adopted a stylised image of the crown for use in coats of arms, badges, logos and various other insignia.

=== Technicians and aircrew ===
In 1950, a new grading system for technicians was introduced. This involved the creation of the following ranks:

RAF technician ranks (1950–1964)
Technician rank	Equivalent rank	Rank insignia
Master technician	Warrant officer	
Chief technician	Flight sergeant	
Senior technician	Sergeant	
Corporal technician	Corporal	
Junior technician	Leading aircraftman	

Also in 1950, the unpopular NCO aircrew ranks were abolished, although Master Aircrew was retained as a rank. Aircrew I became Flight Sergeant Aircrew and Aircrew II, III and IV became Sergeant Aircrew. Both new ranks adopted a gold RAF Eagle between the chevrons to permit continuing distinction from ground trades. Aircrew cadets wore the RAF Eagle on its own as a trade classification badge.

RAF aircrew ranks (1950–present)
Aircrew rank	Rank insignia
Master aircrew	
Flight sergeant aircrew	
Sergeant aircrew	

=== Junior ranks ===
On 1 January 1951, two junior ranks were introduced:

- Senior Aircraftman/Senior Aircraftwoman with a triple-bladed propeller.
- Leading Aircraftman/Leading Aircraftwoman with a double-bladed propeller (this had previously been only a trade classification and not a rank)

== 1960s ==
=== Technicians ===
1964 technician ranks

Chief technician

Junior technician

In 1964, the technician ranks were abolished, with the exception of Junior technician and Chief technician, the latter becoming an intermediate rank between Sergeant and Flight sergeant for technical trades. Junior technicians adopted the four-bladed propeller as their badge of rank and Chief technicians adopted a treble chevron surmounted by a four-bladed propeller as their rank insignia. Master Technicians, Senior Technicians and Corporal Technicians became Warrant Officer, Sergeant and Corporal respectively. The ORs structure became:

- Warrant officer (WO) / Master aircrew (MAcr)
- Flight sergeant (Flt Sgt, F/Sgt, or FS) / Flight sergeant aircrew (FSAcr)
- Chief technician (Chf Tech, C/T, or CT)
- Sergeant (Sgt) / Sergeant Aircrew (SAcr)
- Corporal (Cpl)
- Junior technician (Jnr Tech, J/T, or JT)
- Senior aircraftman (SAC) / Senior aircraftwoman (SACW)
- Leading aircraftman (LAC) / Leading aircraftwoman (LACW)
- Aircraftman (AC) / Aircraftwoman (ACW)

== Changes in the 2000s ==
=== Phasing out of Junior Technician ===
2005 Senior Aircraftman/Aircraftwoman (Technician) rank

From 2005 onwards, no more airmen have been promoted to Junior technician. Although there are currently personnel in the rank of Junior technician, once they have all been promoted or discharged from the RAF, the rank will cease to be used. From March 2005, SACs in technical trades who had attained the Operational Performance Standard were promoted to Senior aircraftman/aircraftwoman (technician) SAC(T) and given a new badge of rank, consisting of the three-bladed propeller inside a circle. This new rank was introduced to distinguish airmen trained to work unsupervised from those who were not, and is equivalent to the old Junior technician rank.

=== Introduction of Lance Corporal ===
On 1 April 2010, the RAF Regiment introduced the rank of lance corporal for SACs at the time who undertook the role of section second-in-command/fire team commander. This gave them more authority on the ground, as well as a better pay band. The rank has not moved to other trades, and is solely in the RAF Regiment.

=== Aviator replaces Airman/Airwoman ===
In November 2021 the official RAF magazine AirClues promulgated: "the term 'aviator' has now replaced the generic term of ‘airman’ to bring right up to date the way we should describe all of our personnel," since women now numbered a fifth of candidates applying to enlist in the RAF.

=== Air Specialist replaces Airman/Airwoman ===
In July 2022, the RAF officially introduced the ranks Air recruit, Air specialist class 2, Air specialist class 1 and Air specialist (class 1) technician to replace the ranks Aircraftman/woman, Leading Aircraftman/woman, Senior Aircraftman/woman and Senior Aircraftman/woman (Technician). This was an attempt to further promote gender neutrality and inclusion with the RAF.

== Timeline of changes ==
Rank group	Senior NCOs							Junior NCOs			Enlisted
Royal Flying Corps (1912–April 1918)											No insignia
Royal Flying Corps (1912–April 1918)	Warrant officer class I		Warrant officer class II	Quartermaster sergeant	Flight sergeant	Sergeant		Corporal		Air mechanic 1st class	Air mechanic 2nd class			Air mechanic 3rd class
Royal Naval Air Service (1914–April 1918)				2 golden cuff buttons, and a golden eagle pin on the collar: Chief petty officer mechanic, 1st grade / Chief petty officer mechanic, 2nd grade / Chief petty officer mechanic, 3rd grade
Royal Naval Air Service (1914–April 1918)				2 golden cuff buttons, and a golden eagle pin on the collar: Chief petty officer mechanic, 1st grade / Chief petty officer mechanic, 2nd grade / Chief petty officer mechanic, 3rd grade		Petty officer mechanic		Leading mechanic			Air mechanic, 1st class			Air mechanic, 1st class (acting)	Air mechanic, 2nd class
(1918–1919)											No insignia
(1918–1919)	Sergeant major 1st class		Sergeant major 2nd class	Flight sergeant		Sergeant		Corporal			Private 1st class			Private 2nd class
(1919–1933)											No insignia
(1919–1933)	Sergeant major 1st class		Sergeant major 2nd class	Flight sergeant		Sergeant		Corporal			Leading aircraftman		Aircraftman 1st class	Aircraftman 2nd class
(1933–1939)											No insignia
(1933–1939)	Warrant officer class I		Warrant officer class II	Flight sergeant		Sergeant		Corporal			Leading aircraftman		Aircraftman 1st class	Aircraftman 2nd class
(1939–1950)											No insignia
(1939–1950)	Warrant officer			Flight sergeant		Sergeant		Corporal			Leading aircraftman		Aircraftman 1st class	Aircraftman 2nd class
(1950–1951)											No insignia
(1950–1951)	Warrant officer	Master technician		Flight sergeant	Chief technician	Sergeant	Senior technician	Corporal	Corporal technician	Junior technician	Leading aircraftman		Aircraftman 1st class	Aircraftman 2nd class
(1951–1953)														No insignia
(1951–1953)	Warrant officer	Master technician		Flight sergeant	Chief technician	Sergeant	Senior technician	Corporal	Corporal technician	Junior technician	Senior aircraftman		Leading aircraftman	Aircraftman
(1953–1964)														No insignia
(1953–1964)	Warrant officer	Master technician		Flight sergeant	Chief technician	Sergeant	Senior technician	Corporal	Corporal technician	Junior technician	Senior aircraftman		Leading aircraftman	Aircraftman
(1964–2005)														No insignia
(1964–2005)	Warrant officer			Flight sergeant	Chief technician	Sergeant		Corporal		Junior technician	Senior aircraftman/woman		Leading aircraftman/woman	Aircraftman/woman
(2005–2010)														No insignia
(2005–2010)	Warrant officer			Flight sergeant	Chief technician	Sergeant		Corporal			Senior aircraftman/ woman technician	Senior aircraftman/woman	Leading aircraftman/woman	Aircraftman/woman
(2010–2023)														No insignia
(2010–2023)	Warrant officer			Flight sergeant	Chief technician	Sergeant		Corporal		Lance corporal (RAF Regiment only)	Senior aircraftman/ woman technician	Senior aircraftman/woman	Leading aircraftman/woman	Aircraftman/woman
(2023–present)														No insignia
(2023–present)	Warrant officer			Flight sergeant	Chief technician	Sergeant		Corporal		Lance corporal (RAF Regiment only)	Air specialist (class 1) technician	Air specialist (class 1)	Air specialist (class 2)	Air recruit
NATO code	OR-9		OR-8	OR-7		OR-6	OR-5	OR-4		OR-3	OR-2			OR-1

Aircrew

Rank group	Senior NCOs					Junior NCOs		Enlisted
(1946–1950)
(1946–1950)	Master aircrew		Aircrew I	Aircrew II		Aircrew III	Aircrew IV		Aircrew Cadet
(1950–1953)
(1950–1953)	Master aircrew		Flight sergeant aircrew	Sergeant aircrew
(1953–2023)
(1953–2023)	Master aircrew		Flight sergeant aircrew	Sergeant aircrew
(2023–present)
(2023–present)	Master aircrew		Flight sergeant aircrew	Sergeant aircrew
NATO code	OR-9	OR-8	OR-7	OR-6	OR-5	OR-4	OR-3	OR-2	OR-1

== See also ==
- Aircrew brevet
- British Army Other Ranks rank insignia
- Comparative military ranks of World War I
- Comparative military ranks of World War II
- Comparative military ranks
- List of Royal Air Force ground trades
- List of Royal Air Force members
- Military rank
- RAF officer ranks
- Ranks and insignia of NATO Air Forces Enlisted
- Ranks of the cadet forces of the United Kingdom
- Royal Navy ratings rank insignia
- Royal Observer Corps ranks
- Women's Auxiliary Air Force ranks
