= Lance corporal =

Military rank

Lance corporal is a military rank, used by many English-speaking armed forces worldwide, and also by some police forces and other uniformed organisations. It is below the rank of corporal.

== Etymology ==
The presumed origin of the rank of lance corporal derives from an amalgamation of "corporal" from the Italian phrase capo corporale ("head of the body") with the now-archaic lancepesade, which in turn derives from the Italian lancia spezzata, which literally means "broken lance" or "broken spear", formerly a non-commissioned officer of the lowest rank. It can be translated as "one who has broken a lance in combat", and is therefore a leader. Other sources claim that it referred to a knight who had broken his lance and lost his horse, and thus had to join a foot company temporarily; or to gendarmerie who could no longer afford to fight on horseback and formed a foot unit.

"Lance" or "lances fournies" was also a term used in medieval Europe to denote a unit of soldiers (usually three or six men).

== Commonwealth states ==
In Commonwealth militaries, a lance corporal is usually the second-in-command of a section. Lance corporals are commonly addressed as "corporal", with "lance jack" or "half-screw" (with corporals being "full screws") being common colloquialisms for the rank. Much like the use of bombardier instead of corporal in artillery units, lance corporals are known as lance bombardiers in the UK, Australia and New Zealand. The badge of rank is a single chevron worn on both sleeves or on an epaulette.

=== Australia and New Zealand ===
Lance corporal is the lowest of the non-commissioned officer ranks in the Australian Army and New Zealand Army, falling between private and corporal. It is the only appointed rank, and thus demotion is easier than with other ranks. A commanding officer can demote a lance corporal, whereas other ranks require a court martial for demotion. A lance corporal is usually the second in command of a section, and is in control of the gun group in an infantry section. There is no equivalent rank within the Royal Australian or New Zealand Air Force or Navy.

Second corporal was also formerly used in Australia in the same way that it was used in the British Army.

=== Bangladesh ===
In the Bangladesh Army, the rank of lance corporal is above the rank of sainik (সৈনিক) and below the rank of corporal.

=== Canada ===
The Canadian Armed Forces abolished the Canadian Army rank of lance corporal on their creation as a unified force in 1968.

=== United Kingdom ===
Lance corporal
- Army, marine and RAF insignia
- Country: United Kingdom
- Service branch: British Army; Royal Marines; (United Kingdom) RAF Regiment
- Abbreviation: LCpl
- Rank group: Non-commissioned officer
- NATO rank code: OR-3
- Next higher rank: Corporal
- Next lower rank: Private (or equivalent)
- Equivalent ranks: Lance bombardier

==== British Army and Royal Marines ====
Lance corporal (LCpl or formerly L/Cpl) is the lowest ranking non-commissioned officer in the British Army and Royal Marines, between private and corporal.

The badge of rank is a single point-down chevron worn on both sleeves, or on an epaulette on the front of the Combat Soldier 95 dress standard. However, lance corporals in the Foot Guards, Honourable Artillery Company, 1st The Queen's Dragoon Guards and The Queen's Royal Hussars wear two chevrons and lance corporals in the Household Cavalry wear two chevrons surmounted by a gilt crown. The Royal Artillery uses the rank of lance bombardier instead.

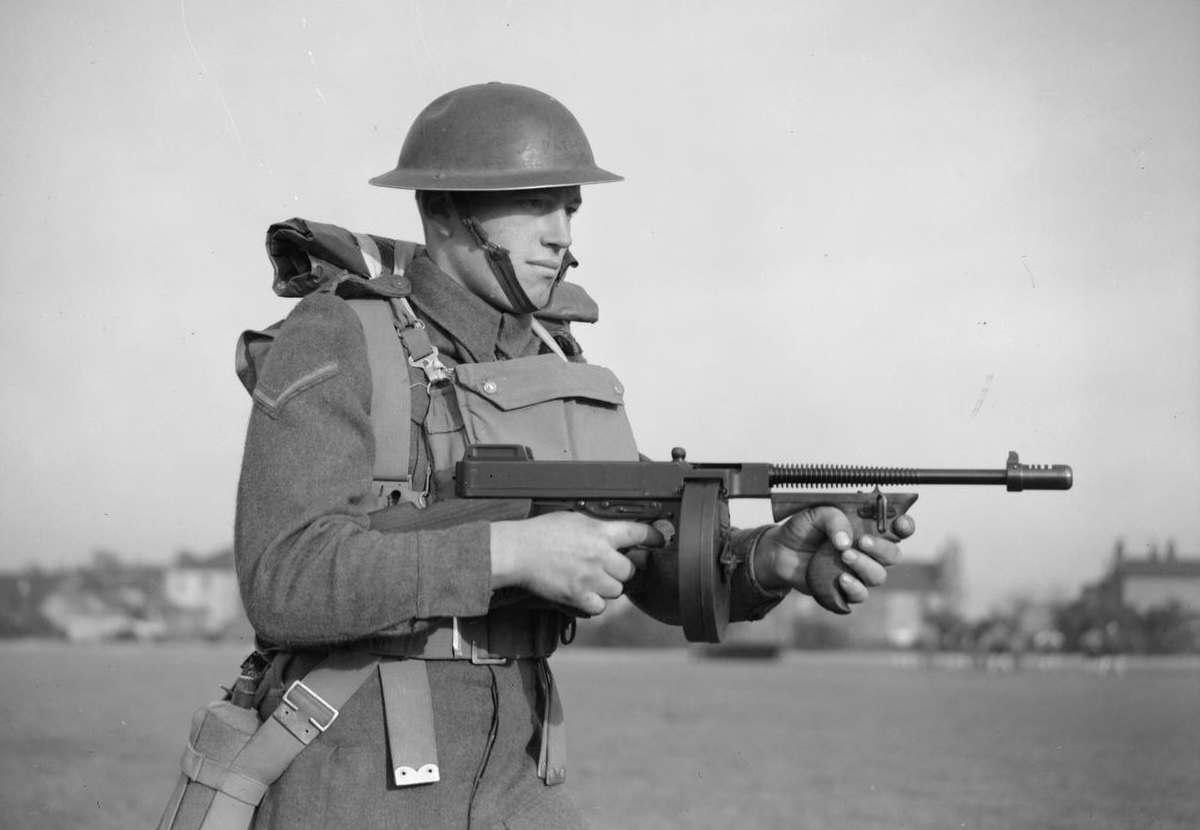
A lance corporal of the East Surrey Regiment equipped with a Thompson M1928 submachine gun (drum magazine), 25 November 1940

The date of introduction of lance corporals to the British Army is unclear, but the rank is mentioned in late-18th century military essays such as Major William Young's "An essay on the Command of Small Detachments" (1766) and John Williamson's "The Elements of Military Arrangement" (1781):

"When from sickness or other causes there are not in a company a sufficient number of non-commission officers to do the duty, the captain can appoint corporals to do the duty of serjeants, who are called lance serjeants, and private men to do the duty of corporals, who are called lance corporals."

The designation "chosen man", used during the Napoleonic Wars, was possibly a precursor to the rank. The first mention of a lance corporal in The Times is in 1819, although the first mention in the London Gazette is not until 1831. The first mention in the London Gazette of a lance corporal in the Royal Marines is in 1838.

Until 1 September 1961, lance corporal and lance bombardier were only appointments rather than substantive ranks, given to privates (or equivalent) who were acting NCOs, and could be taken away by the soldier's commanding officer (whereas a full corporal or bombardier could only be demoted by court martial). Until 1920, the Royal Engineers and Army Ordnance Corps also used the similar rank of second corporal, which was a substantive rank (also wearing one chevron). Until 1920, bombardiers in the Royal Artillery were equivalent to second corporals and until 1918 (when the rank of lance bombardier replaced it), acting bombardiers were equivalent to lance corporals (both wearing one chevron).

In the infantry, a lance corporal usually serves as second-in-command of a section and commander of its delta fire team. It is also a rank commonly held by specialists such as clerks, drivers, signallers, machine-gunners, and mortarmen. In the Intelligence Corps and Royal Military Police, all other ranks are promoted to lance corporal on completion of their training.

==== Royal Air Force ====
On 1 April 2010, the rank of lance corporal was introduced into the RAF Regiment, although it is not used by other branches of the Royal Air Force. RAF Regiment lance corporals have powers of charge over aircraftmen, leading aircraftmen and senior aircraftmen, but not junior technicians or senior aircraftmen technicians, who, despite being OR2s, require a corporal or above to charge if required.

==== Cadet forces ====
The British cadet forces reflect the ranks of their parent services, so the Army Cadet Force, the Army section of the Combined Cadet Force (CCF), and the various marine cadet organisations use cadet lance corporal as their lowest NCO rank. In the CCF (RAF), this rank is also used as the lowest NCO rank (it was formerly known as junior corporal before its introduction into the RAF Regiment). The Air Training Corps and the naval cadet forces do not use the rank.

== Singapore ==
=== Singapore Armed Forces ===
The Lance Corporal (LCP) rank in the Singapore Armed Forces (SAF) is between the rank of Private (PTE) and Corporal (CPL).

Lance-corporals who are appointed second-in-command/third-in-command of a section can give commands to the rest of the section. National servicemen are usually promoted to this rank after completing their respective vocational courses and within the first year of service. Servicemen who fail to pass their Individual physical proficiency test (IPPT) during their active service will have their rank capped at LCP regardless of vocation.

A lance-corporal wears rank insignia of a single point-down chevron with an arc above it (similar to an inverted US Army PFC rank insignia).

=== Uniformed youth organisations ===
In the National Cadet Corps (NCC), the National Police Cadet Corps (NPCC) and the National Civil Defence Cadet Corps (NCDCC), the rank of lance corporal is below the rank of corporal. Generally, the rank is awarded to cadets in secondary two. NCC, NPCC and NCDCC lance corporals rarely, if not never, have the chance to command a squad.

NCC lance corporals wear the same rank insignia as that of the SAF, except that the letters 'NCC' are below the insignia so as to differentiate NCC cadets from SAF personnel. NPCC and NCDCC lance corporals wear the same rank insignia as that of an SCDF lance corporal, except that the letters 'NPCC' and 'NCDCC' are below the insignia so as to differentiate NPCC and NCDCC cadets from Singapore Police Force and Singapore Civil Defence Force personnel respectively.

== United States ==
Lance corporal
- Lance corporal's dress blues arm chevron (USMC)
- Service branch: United States Army (USA); United States Marine Corps (USMC)
- Abbreviation: LCpl
- Rank group: Enlisted rank
- NATO rank code: OR-3
- Pay grade: E-3
- Formation: 1802 (USA); 1830s (USMC)
- Abolished: 1920 (USA)
- Next higher rank: Corporal
- Next lower rank: Private first class
- Equivalent ranks: Seaman (Navy); Airman first class (Air Force); Private first class (USA)

=== Army ===
Lance corporal was a title used in the United States Army to denote privates serving as temporary non-commissioned officers. The title of lance corporal existed in the U.S. Army from at least 1802, as the U.S. Army Institute of Heraldry documents its first occurrence in an "unofficial journal" dated that year. The first official use of the title of lance corporal is documented in the General Regulations for the Army, or, Military Institutes (Articles 18 and 20), authorized by an Act of Congress on 2 March 1821 and published by the War Department in July 1821 and again on 1 March 1825.

In the edition of 1901 "With Appendix Separately Indexed And Showing Changes to January 1, 1901", in the Appendix, page 331, in Headquarters of the Army, General Orders, No. 42, June 30, 1897, Part II, the lance corporal is authorized to wear "...a chevron having one bar..." In Regulations for the Army of the United States 1904 (Article XXX, Paragraph 263), "...no company shall have more than one lance corporal at a time, unless there are noncommissioned officers absent by authority, during which absences there may be one for each absentee." This proscription appears again in Article XXX, Paragraph 272 of Regulations for the Army of the United States 1910, and the editions of 1913, and 1917 "Corrected to April 15, 1917 (Changes, Nos. 1 to 55)".

In 1920, the former lance corporal insignia of rank was assigned to the rank of private first class in War Department Circular No. 303, dated 3 August 1920. However, the Institute of Heraldry states that some older U.S. Army Tables of Organization and Equipment still in use in 1940 continued to authorize lance corporals.

In February 1965, the US Army announced that, effective from 1 September 1965, pay grade E-3 would be redesignated as lance corporal. The rank insignia was to be the pre-World War II specialist grade 6 insignia of one chevron above one arc, or "rocker". However, by September 1965 the plan was cancelled. The insignia was, however, adopted for pay grade E-3, which continued to be named private first class.

=== Marine Corps ===
Lance corporal (LCpl) is the third enlisted rank in order of seniority in the United States Marine Corps, just above private first class and below corporal. It is the most commonly held rank in the USMC, and the highest one that a marine can hold without being a non-commissioned officer.

The USMC is the only component of the U.S. Armed Forces to currently use the rank. Promotion to lance corporal is based on time in grade, time in service, and the conduct of the marine. Further promotion to the NCO ranks (corporal and above) is competitive and takes into account the individual service record of the marine. There can only be a certain number of corporals and sergeants in each MOS, so even with a qualifying score, promotions may be delayed due to an excessive number of corporals occupying billets in a certain MOS.

From the earliest years of the Corps, the ranks of lance corporal and lance sergeant were in common usage. The rank of lance corporal has been used in the Marine Corps since the 1830s in the Indian Wars. Marines were appointed temporarily from the next lower rank to the higher grade but were still paid at the lower rank. By 1887, this practice was widespread in the Corps. The Commandant had later ordered that such appointments should only last one month, and that if the marine holding the appointment had failed to pass the relevant examination for the rank he was temporarily serving by the end of this one month period, his appointment was to be given to someone else. As the rank structure became more firmly defined, the rank of lance sergeant fell out of use, but the rank of lance corporal remained in unofficial use in the Corps into the 1930s, although it had officially become redundant when the rank of private first class was established in 1917. The rank of lance corporal fell out of usage prior to World War II, but was permanently re-established in the sweeping rank restructuring of 1958.

=== Other agencies ===
Lance corporal's rank insignia of the South Carolina Highway Patrol (SCHP)

Some law enforcement agencies, most notably the South Carolina Highway Patrol, use the rank for non-supervisory officers.

== Gallery ==
Lance corporal
(Antigua and Barbuda Regiment)

Lance corporal
(Australian Army)

ল্যান্স কর্পোর‍্যাল
Lyānsa karpōrāla
(Bangladesh Army)

Lance corporal
(Barbados Regiment)

Lance corporal
(Belize Defence Force)

Lance corporal
(Botswana Ground Force)

Lance corporal
(Dzongkha: འགོ་ པ །, romanized: Gopa)
(Royal Bhutan Army)

Lans koperal
(Royal Brunei Land Force)

Lance corporal
(Fiji Infantry Regiment)

Lance corporal
(Gambian National Army)

Lance corporal
(Ghana Army)

Lance corporal
(Guyana Army)

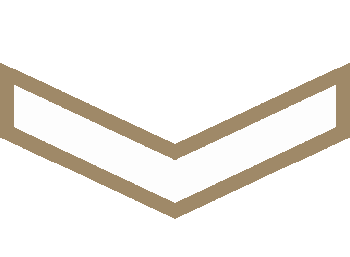
Lance corporal
(Jamaican Army)

Lance corporal
(Kenya Army)

Lance corporal
(Lesotho Army)

Lance corporal
(Malawi Army)

ލާންސް ކޯޕްރަލް
Laans koapral
(Maldives National Defence Force)

Lans koperal
(Malaysian Army)

Lance corporal
(Namibian Army)

Lance corporal
(New Zealand Army)

Lance corporal
(Nigerian Army)

Lance corporal
(Papua New Guinea Land Element)

Lance corporal
(Saint Kitts and Nevis Regiment)

Lance corporal
(Seychelles Infantry Unit)

Lance corporal
(Sierra Leone Army)

Lance corporal
(Singapore Army)

Lance corporal
(Sri Lanka Army)

Lance corporal
(South African Army)

Lance corporal
(Tongan Land Component)

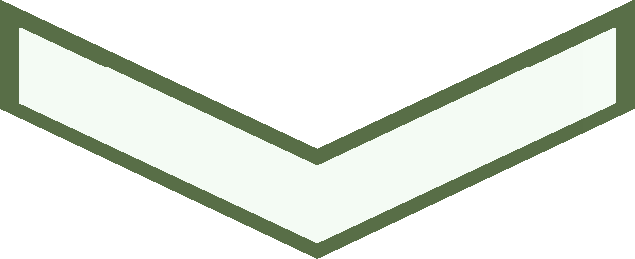
Lance corporal
(Trinidad and Tobago Regiment)

Lance corporal
(Ugandan Land Forces)

Lance corporal
(British Army)

Lance corporal
(British Household Cavalry)

Lance corporal
(Zambian Army)

Lance corporal
(Zimbabwe National Army)

Lance corporal (United States Marine Corps)

== Variants ==
=== Sweden ===
Sweden uses the rank of vicekorpral (previously vicekonstapel, or "vice constable", in the artillery and anti-aircraft artillery) between private and korpral. It was primarily a training grade discontinued in 1972 but reinstated in 2009.

== See also ==
- Comparative military ranks
- Lance sergeant
- Lances fournies
- Terminal Lance
