= Bombardier (rank) =

Military rank

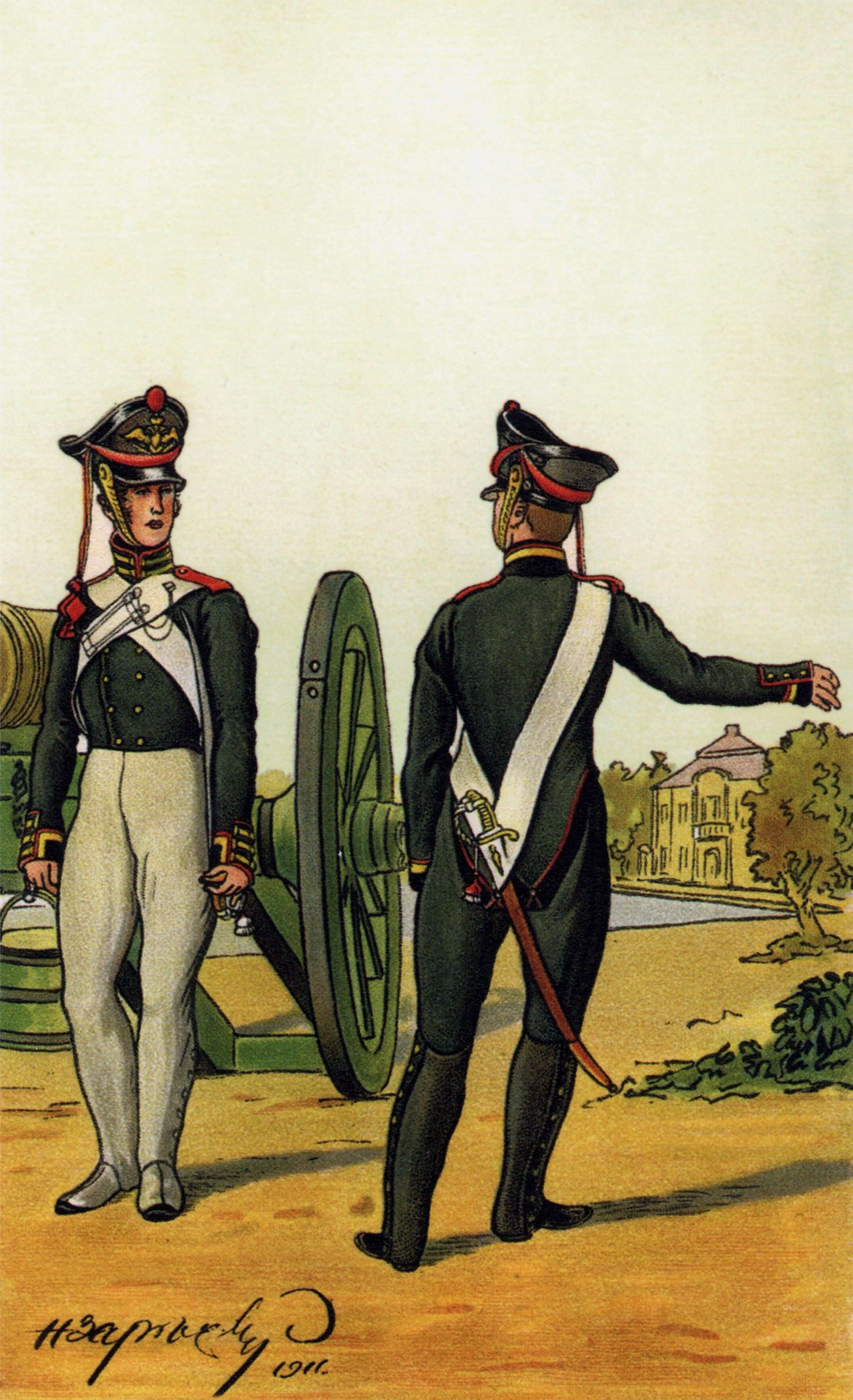
Russian Bombardier (left) and Feuerwerker (1812).

Bombardier (/ˌbɒmbəˈdɪər/) is a military rank that has existed since the 16th century in artillery regiments of various armies, such as in the British Army and the Prussian Army. Traditionally the bombardier tended the vents at the top of breeches, handled the final assembly of ammunition and placed the ammunition in the muzzles for the gunners to fire. It is today equivalent to the rank of corporal in other branches. The rank of lance bombardier is the artillery counterpart of lance corporal.

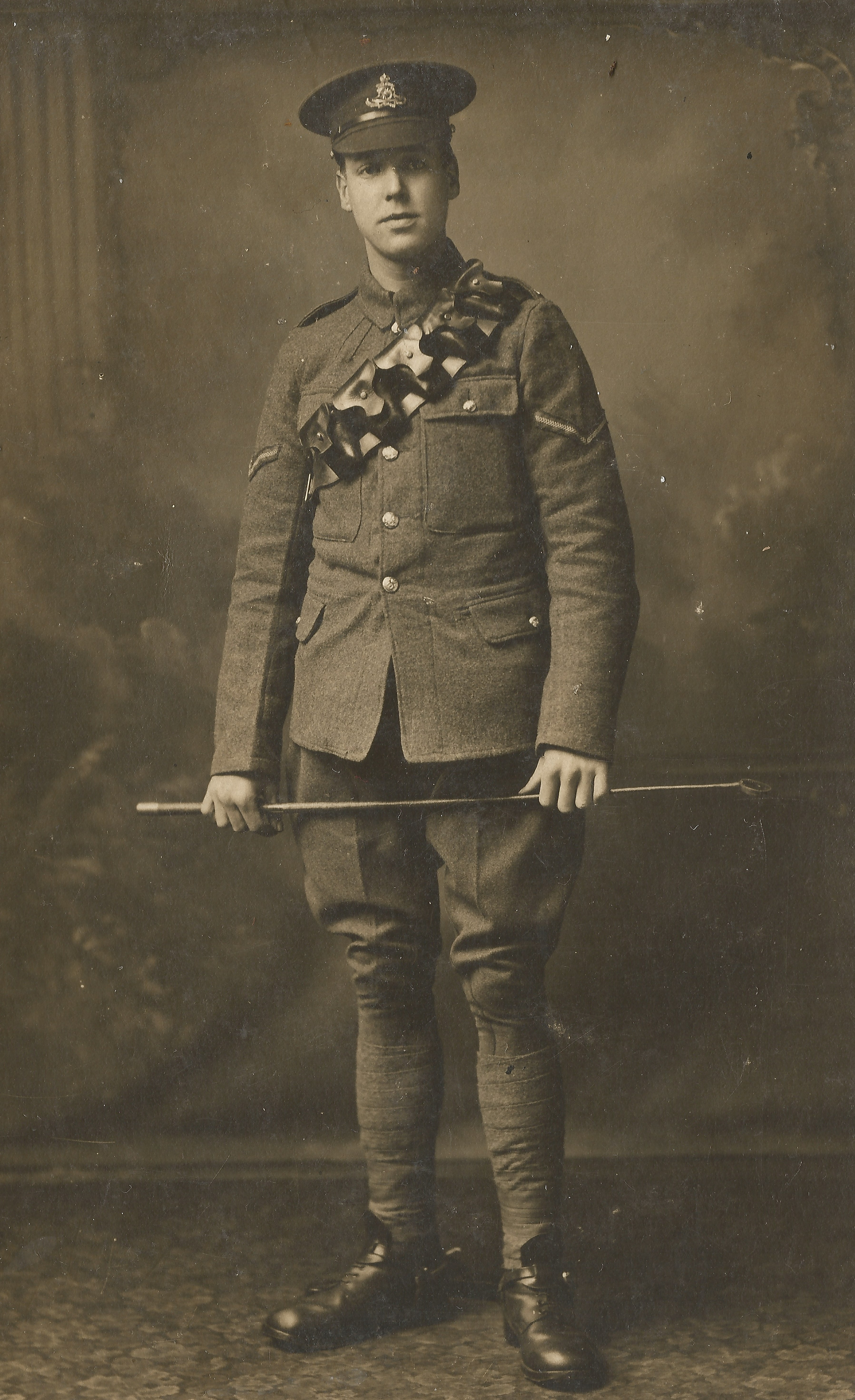
Bombardier Duncan Bromwich of Leyton, England (1893–1917) in his Royal Field Artillery Bombardier uniform.

== Commonwealth armies ==
Bombardier (Bdr) and lance bombardier (LBdr or L/Bdr) are used by the British Army in the Royal Artillery and Royal Horse Artillery. The same applies to the Royal Australian Artillery, the Royal Regiment of New Zealand Artillery, the South African Army Artillery Formation and the Armed Forces of Malta. The Royal Regiment of Canadian Artillery uses the ranks of master bombardier and bombardier, corresponding to master corporal and corporal.

Originally, the Royal Artillery had corporals, but not lance corporals. Unlike a lance corporal, a bombardier, who was junior to a corporal, held full non-commissioned rank and not an acting appointment. The rank was equivalent to second corporal in the Royal Engineers and Army Ordnance Corps.

In 1920 corporals were abolished in the Royal Artillery; bombardiers became the equivalent and acquired the normal two chevrons.

The rank of lance bombardier originated as acting bombardier, an appointment similar to lance corporal and also indicated by a single chevron. The appointment was renamed lance bombardier in February 1918. It became a full rank, along with lance corporal, in 1961.

== See also ==
- British Army other ranks rank insignia
- List of comparative military ranks
- Canadian Armed Forces ranks and insignia
