= Chief technician =

Rank of the British Royal Air Force

Rank badge of a Royal Air Force chief technician

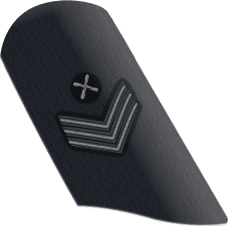
RAF chief technician as it appears on dress uniform

Chief technician (Chf Tech or formerly C/T) is a senior non-commissioned rank in the Royal Air Force which is only held by aviators in technical trades and by musicians. It is between sergeant and flight sergeant and, like the latter has a NATO code of OR-7. Aviators in non-technical trades progress directly from sergeant to flight sergeant. Along with junior technician this is a survivor of a separate ranking system for technicians introduced in 1950 and abolished in 1964. During that period it was equivalent to flight sergeant, but was made junior to that rank in 1964. Chief technicians are usually addressed as "Chief".

The rank of Chief Technician falls into Supplement 3 Pay Scales, an exception was Weapons Technician, which fell into Supplement 2 Pay Scales. The RAF have seen their error and have now put them up to supplement 3 again.

This enhanced pay rewards those who wish to take on a technical trade. It is quite normal for a Trade Group (TG1) Supp 3 C/T (weapons/airframes/avionics) to be paid more than a TG17 Supp 1 Flight Sergeant (admin).

To mitigate the extra ranks, a Chief Technician is said to receive a 'Flight Sergeants pension" after 2 years in rank and are currently receiving an extra uplift in pay (daily), due to holding "technical status", as part of the DERR Policy set out on NEM2016.

== Rank insignia ==
The rank badge is three chevrons below a four-bladed propeller which is essentially the same badge as Royal Flying Corps sergeants wore. Between 1950 and 1964 the badge was three point up chevrons below a crown.

== See also ==
- RAF other ranks
