= Master aircrew =

RAF Master aircrew badge of rank

- A master aircrew's rank insignia
- Country: United Kingdom
- Service branch: Royal Air Force
- Abbreviation: MAcr
- Rank group: Warrant officer
- NATO rank code: OR-9
- Formation: 1 July 1946
- Next lower rank: Flight sergeant aircrew
- Equivalent ranks: Warrant officer 1

Master aircrew (MAcr) is the warrant-officer rank held by aircrew in the Royal Air Force. It is equivalent to warrant officer in other trades, and is effectively the highest non-commissioned aircrew rank. It has a NATO rank code of OR-9.

People holding this rank used to be referred to by different titles depending on their specialisation:

- Master Signaller (MSig)
- Master Engineer (MEng)
- Master Air Electronics Operator (MAEOp)
- Master Air Loadmaster (MALM).

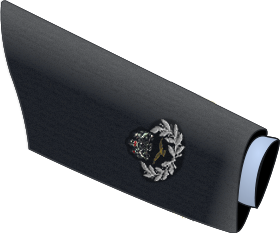
RAF master aircrew as it appears on dress uniform

This rank is the sole survivor of a system of separate ranks for aircrew which existed between 1 July 1946 and 1950 (another system for technical staff existed between 1950 and 1964). Other designations, such as master pilot and master navigator, once existed, but now these specialisations are only held by officers.

The badge of rank is a small version of the Royal Arms (as worn by a warrant officer) with an eagle below, all surrounded by a wreath. Master aircrew receive a warrant signed by the Secretary of State for Defence.

== New Zealand ==
The Royal New Zealand Air Force used the rank until June 2007 when the Master Aircrew rank reverted to Warrant Officer.

== See also ==
- RAF enlisted ranks
