= Junior technician =

Junior technician (Jnr Tech or J/T) was a junior non-commissioned rank in the Royal Air Force and is also used in the Pakistan Air Force. In the RAF, it ranked above senior aircraftman and below corporal and had a NATO rank code of OR-2. In 2000, the RAF replaced it with Senior aircraftman technician, although junior technicians promoted before this date retained their rank.

== Pakistan ==
Junior technician is also a rank in the Pakistan Air Force, where it ranks between corporal technician and senior aircraftman. Since 2006 it has been represented by single chevron beneath an eagle with outstretched wings.

== United Kingdom ==
Junior technician
- Insignia (1964–2005)

- Insignia (1950–1964)
- Country: United Kingdom
- Service branch: Royal Air Force
- Abbreviation: Jnr Tech
- NATO rank code: OR-2
- Formation: 1950
- Abolished: 2005
- Next higher rank: Corporal
- Next lower rank: Senior aircraftman
- Equivalent ranks: Private; Able seaman

The rank of junior technician was only held by airmen in technical trades and by those who joined as apprentices (both technical and administrative) and by musicians. Airmen in non-technical trades always progressed directly from senior aircraftman to corporal. Junior technicians were qualified to work alone and supervise untrained airmen working within their area of responsibility. The rank was introduced in 1950 as part of a new grading system for technicians, wearing a single point up chevron. In 1964, when the grading system was abolished, the rank of junior technician was retained, with the badge changing to a four-bladed propeller. The last administrative apprentices (the 46th entry) passed out from RAF Hereford in 1963.

== See also ==
- RAF other ranks
