= Aircraftman =

Lowest rank in the British Royal Air Force

Aircraftman (AC) or aircraftwoman (ACW) was formerly the lowest rank in the British Royal Air Force (RAF) and is still in use by the air forces of several other Commonwealth countries. In RAF slang, aircraftmen were sometimes called "erks".

Aircraftman ranked below leading aircraftman and has a NATO rank code of OR-1. For some time in the RAF it had been a training rank only and no airmen in productive service held the rank. Aircraftmen do not wear any rank insignia. The rank was renamed air recruit (AR) in the Royal Air Force in July 2022.

== History ==
The rank was introduced to the RAF in January 1919, replacing the ranks of "air mechanic", "private" and "clerk" that had been introduced under Air Memorandum No. 1 in March 1918. There were three grades: leading aircraftman (LAC), aircraftman 1st class (AC1) and aircraftman 2nd class. A similar grading existed for junior ratings in the Royal Navy. The rank of senior aircraftman (SAC) was introduced on 1 January 1951.

The lowest grade was an AC2; also colloquially known as an "AC plonk". With effect from 1 April 1964, the gradings of AC1 and AC2 were abolished, with "aircraftman" becoming the entry rank.

== Canada ==
In the Royal Canadian Air Force, the rank is also known by the French term of aviateur. This was changed from private in spring 2015 when the RCAF changed the colour of its rank insignia from gold to pearl grey. It is the lowest rank in the RCAF. Prior to 1968 the rank of aircraftman was used in the RCAF as in other Commonwealth air forces. In August 2020, the rank was changed to aviator.

== New Zealand ==
In the Royal New Zealand Air Force, the rank was known as "aircraftman", regardless of the person's sex, in line with "seaman" in the Royal New Zealand Navy. It was renamed "aviator classification" in April 2026.

In 2023, the RNZAF adopted the title of 'aviator' rather than airman when describing Air Force personnel.

== Gallery ==
Aircraftman/
aircraftwoman
(Royal Australian Air Force)

Aircraftsman
(Ghana Air Force)

Aircraftsman
(Indian Air Force)

Aircraftsman
(Kenya Air Force)

Aviator Classification
(Royal New Zealand Air Force)

Aircraftman
(Pakistan Air Force)

Aircraftsman
(South African Air Force)

Air recruit
(Royal Air Force)

Aircraftsman
(Air Force of Zimbabwe)

== See also ==
- RAF enlisted ranks
- Airman
