= Senior aircraftman technician =

Former enlisted rank of the Royal Air Force

Air specialist (class 1) technician
- Insignia
- Country: United Kingdom
- Service branch: Royal Air Force
- Abbreviation: AS1(T)
- NATO rank code: OR-2
- Formation: 2000
- Next higher rank: Corporal; Lance corporal (RAF Regiment only)
- Next lower rank: Air Specialist (class 1)
- Equivalent ranks: Private; Able seaman

Related articles
- History: Senior aircraftman technician (SAC Tech)

Air specialist (class 1) technician (AS1(T)), formerly senior aircraftman technician (SAC Tech or SAC(T)) until July 2022, is a rank in the Royal Air Force, ranking between senior aircraftman and corporal and having a NATO rank code of OR-2. Air specialist technicians are not NCOs and can not administratively discipline other personnel.

The rank, which is self-supervisory, was introduced in 2000 to replace junior technician (although junior technicians promoted before this date retained their rank). The rank badge is a three-bladed propeller inside a circle.

From March 2005, SACs in technical trades who had attained the Operational Performance Standard were promoted to SAC technician. This rank was introduced to distinguish airmen who had finished trade specific training, although they still required supervision from a corporal or senior NCO.

== Previous use of insignia ==
The insignia of a 3- or 4-bladed propeller surrounded by a circle was originally used after World War II to identify trade apprentices. It fell out of use after a very short period in service.

== See also ==
- RAF enlisted ranks
