= Flight sergeant =

Senior non-commissioned rank in the Royal Air Force

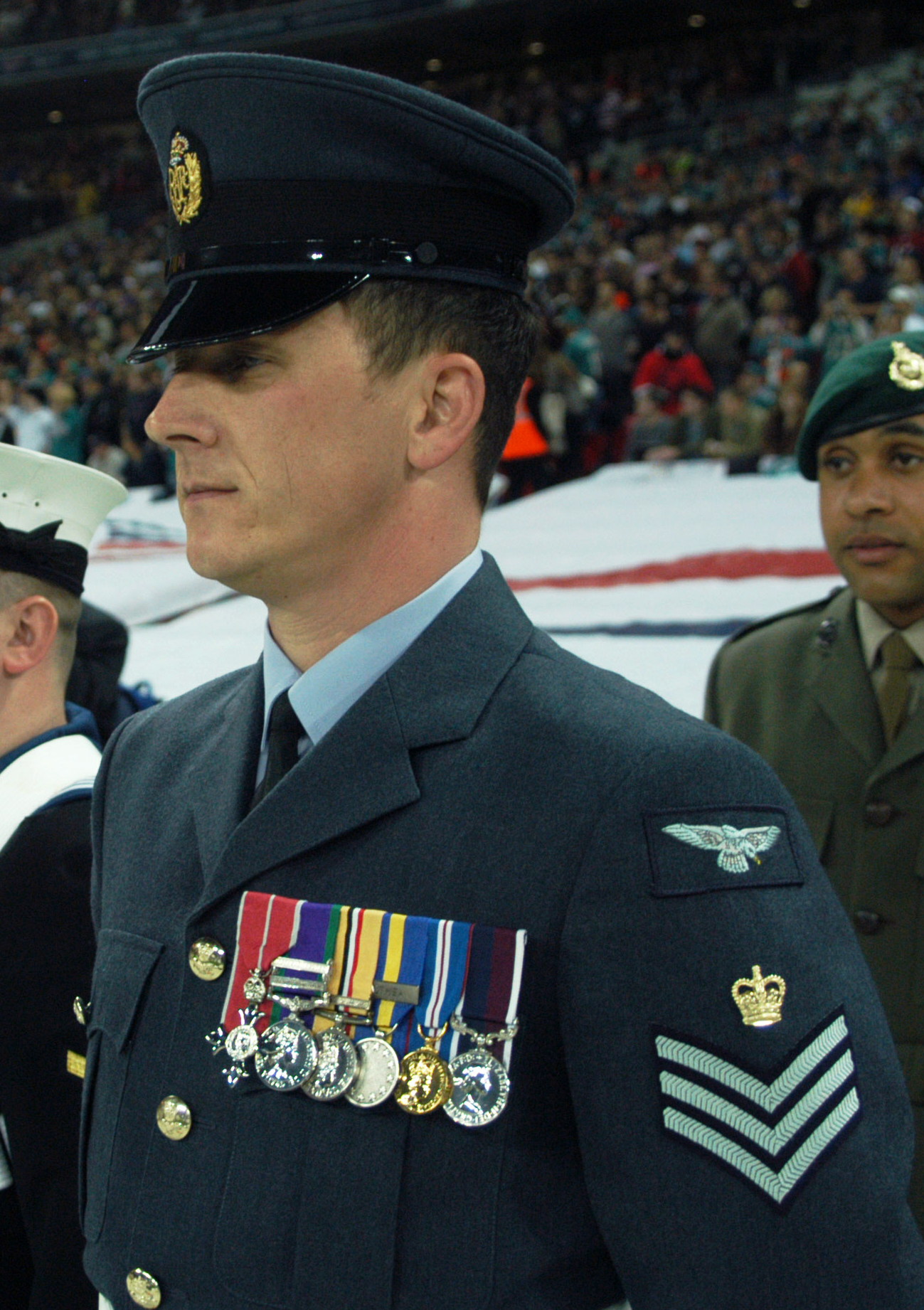
A Royal Air Force flight sergeant

Flight sergeant (commonly abbreviated to Flt Sgt, F/Sgt, FSGT or, currently correctly in the RAF, FS) is a senior non-commissioned rank in the Royal Air Force and several other air forces which have adopted all or part of the RAF rank structure. It is equivalent to a staff sergeant or colour sergeant in the British Army, a colour sergeant in the Royal Marines, and a chief petty officer in the Royal Navy, and has a NATO rank code of OR-7. In the RAF, flight sergeant ranks above chief technician and below warrant officer.

== History ==
The rank was introduced into the Royal Flying Corps (RFC) in 1912 and passed to the Royal Air Force on its formation in 1918. RFC flight sergeants wore a four-bladed propeller between the chevrons and the crown.

On 1 July 1946, aircrew flight sergeants were redesignated aircrew I and replaced their chevrons with three six-pointed stars within a wreath and surmounted by an eagle and a crown. This proved unpopular however, and in 1950 they reverted to their old rank and badge, although flight sergeants aircrew wear an eagle between chevrons and crown.

Between 1950 and 1964, the rank of chief technician was equivalent to flight sergeant and was held instead of that rank by technicians, but now chief technician is a junior rank (still held only by technicians), although classified by NATO in the same grade.

== Current usage ==
Apart from the RAF, the rank of flight sergeant is also used by many Commonwealth air forces, including the Royal Australian Air Force, the Royal New Zealand Air Force, the Sri Lanka Air Force, the Ghana Air Force, the South African Air Force, the Air Force of Zimbabwe and the Royal Thai Air Force. It was also used in the former Royal Rhodesian Air Force. In Canada, since the unification of the Canadian Forces in 1968, this rank has been replaced by warrant officer. It is also used in the Irish Air Corps, where it is equivalent to the Irish Army rank of company sergeant. The flight sergeant rank in the Indian Air Force was replaced with the rank of junior warrant officer (JWO), which ranks below a warrant officer and above a sergeant.

In the RAF, the rank insignia is three downward pointing chevrons below a crown.

Flight sergeant is also used in many cadet organisations around the world, such as the Royal Air Force Air Cadets, Australian Air Force Cadets, and Royal Canadian Air Cadets.

== Rank insignia ==
(Royal Australian Air Force)

Sáirsint eitleoige
(Irish Air Corps)

(Kenya Air Force)

(Nigerian Air Force)

Flait sarjan
(Royal Malaysian Air Force)

(Royal New Zealand Air Force)

(South African Air Force)

(Sri Lanka Air Force)

Sajenti Kuruka
(Tanzania Air Force)

(Royal Air Force)

(Air Force of Zimbabwe)

== See also ==
- RAF Other ranks
