= Leading aircraftman =

Junior rank in some air forces

Leading aircraftman (LAC) or leading aircraftwoman (LACW) is an enlisted rank used by some air forces, with origins from the Royal Air Force. The rank is used by air forces of many countries that have historical British influence.

Leading aircraftman is usually immediately senior to aircraftman and immediately below senior aircraftman. The rank was renamed air specialist (class 2) (AS2) in the Royal Air Force in July 2022.

== History ==
The rank originated in the Royal Air Force, when it was formed in 1918. It replaced the Royal Flying Corps rank of air mechanic 1st class (which wore the same badge). It was only a trade classification until 1 January 1951, when it became a rank, although it is non-supervisory.

== Australia ==
Leading aircraftman is a rank in the Royal Australian Air Force (which uses a single chevron rather than a propeller device) where it is the senior aircraftman rank.

== Canada ==
It was a rank until 1968 in the Royal Canadian Air Force being replaced by the army rank of private after unification, which then in 2015 was replaced by aviator (basic).

== New Zealand ==
In the Royal New Zealand Air Force, the rank is awarded after three years of service or completion of a senior trade course, whichever comes first. The rank was renamed Leading Aviator Classification (LAC) in April 2026.

Leading air cadet (LAC) in the New Zealand Air Training Corps also uses the propeller badge. It is not technically a rank (although many units regard it as a very junior NCO rank), and may be awarded to cadets who have attended a minimum of thirty parades, or completed one year in a unit. The rank is generally awarded to those cadets who show obvious leadership skill.

== Gallery ==
(Royal Australian Air Force)

লীডিং এয়ারক্র্যাফটম্যান
Līḍiṁ ēẏārakryāphaṭamyāna
(Bangladesh Air Force)

(Ghana Air Force)

लीडिंग एयरक्राफ्ट्समैन
Leeding eyarakraaphtamain
(Indian Air Force)

(Namibian Air Force)

(Royal New Zealand Air Force)

(Pakistan Air Force)

(Sri Lanka Air Force)

(Air Force of Zimbabwe)

== See also ==
- RAF enlisted ranks
- Aircraftman
- Airman
