= Senior aircraftman =

Non-commissioned rank in the Royal Air Force

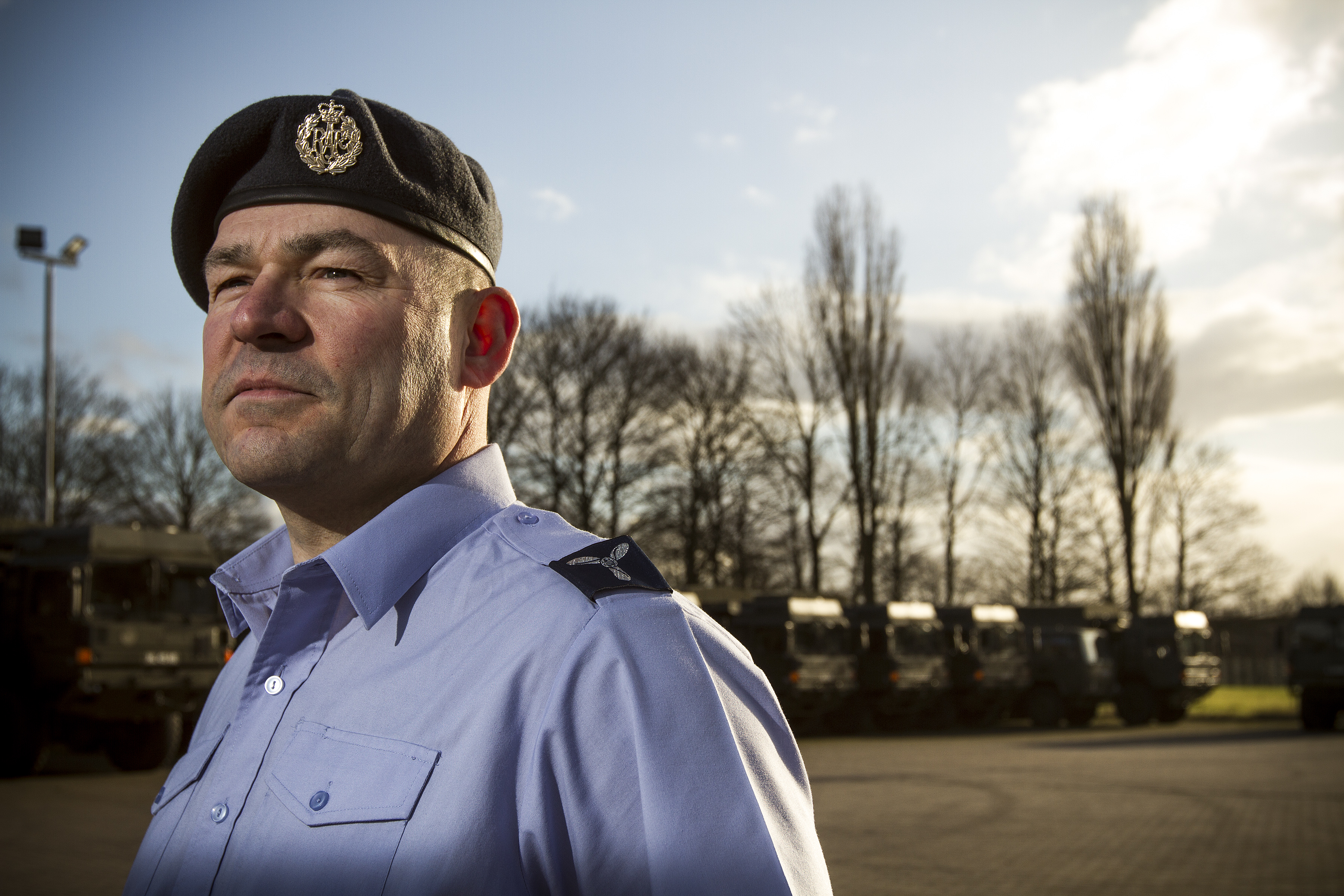
A senior aircraftman reservist.

Senior aircraftman (SAC) or senior aircraftwoman (SACW) was a rank in the Royal Air Force, ranking between leading aircraftman and senior aircraftman technician (SAC(T)) (although SACs in non-technical trades progressed directly to corporal) and having a NATO rank code of OR-2. The rank, which was non-supervisory, was introduced on 1 January 1951. The rank badge was a three-bladed propeller. The rank was renamed Air Specialist (class 1) (AS1) in the Royal Air Force in July 2022.

== Senior aircraftman (technician) ==
From March 2005, SACs in technical trades who had attained the Operational Performance Standard were promoted to Senior aircraftman technician SAC Tech and given a new badge of rank, consisting of the three-bladed propeller inside a circle. This new rank was introduced, to distinguish airmen trained to work unsupervised from those who were not, and is equivalent to the old junior technician rank.

== Gallery ==
Senior aircraftman
(Pakistan Air Force)

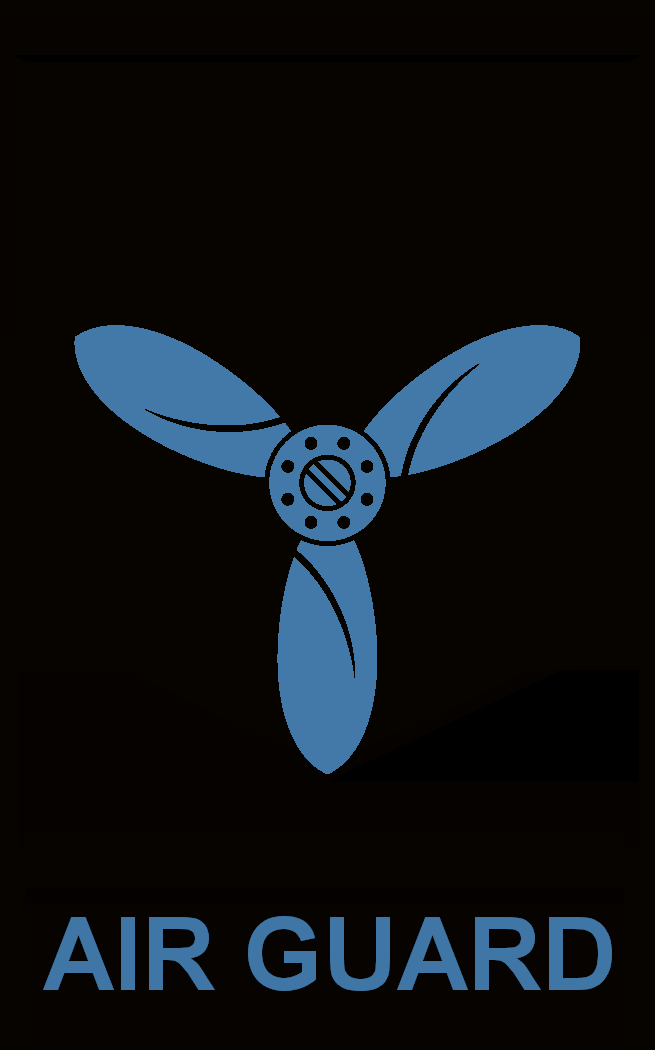
Senior aircraftman
(Trinidad and Tobago Air Guard)

Air specialist (class 1)
(Royal Air Force)

Senior aircraftman
(Air Force of Zimbabwe)

== See also ==
- RAF other ranks
