= List of comparative military ranks =

This article is a list of various nations' armed forces ranking designations. Comparisons are made between the different systems used by nations to categorize the hierarchy of an armed force compared to another. Several of these lists mention NATO rank reference codes. These are used for easy comparison among NATO countries. Links to comparison charts can be found below.

== References to modern military ==
=== Albania ===
- Military ranks of Albania

=== Angola ===
- Military ranks of Angola

=== Argentina ===
- Military ranks of Argentina

=== Australia ===
- Australian Defence Force ranks
- Royal Australian Navy ranks and uniforms
- Australian Army officer rank insignia; Australian Army other ranks insignia
- Ranks of the RAAF

=== Austria ===
- Ranks of the Austrian Bundesheer

=== Armenia ===
- Military ranks of Armenia

=== Azerbaijan ===
- Military ranks of Azerbaijan

=== Bahrain ===
- Military ranks of Bahrain

=== Bangladesh ===
- Military ranks of Bangladesh

=== Belarus ===
- Military ranks of Belarus

=== Belgium ===
- Belgian military ranks

=== Bhutan ===
- Military ranks of Bhutan

=== Bolivia ===
- Military ranks of Bolivia

=== Bosnia and Herzegovina ===
- Military ranks and insignia of Bosnia and Herzegovina

=== Botswana ===
- Military ranks of Botswana

=== Brazil ===
- Military ranks of Brazil

=== Bulgaria ===
- Military ranks of Bulgaria

=== Cambodia ===
- Military ranks of the Royal Cambodian Armed Forces

=== Canada ===
- Canadian Armed Forces ranks and insignia
- Former Canadian Armed Forces ranks and insignia

=== Chile ===
- Military ranks and insignia of Chile

=== China ===
- Ranks of the People's Liberation Army Ground Force
- Ranks of the People's Liberation Army Navy
- Ranks of the People's Liberation Army Air Force
- Ranks of the People's Armed Police

=== Colombia ===
- Military ranks of the Colombian Armed Forces

=== Congo ===
- Military ranks of the Democratic Republic of the Congo

=== Congo-Brazzaville ===
- Military ranks of Republic of the Congo

=== Croatia ===
- Croatian military ranks

=== Cuba ===
- Cuban military ranks

=== Czechia ===
- Czech military ranks

=== Denmark ===
- Military ranks of Denmark
- Danish Army ranks
- Danish Navy ranks
- Danish Air Force ranks

=== Egypt ===
- Military ranks of Egypt

=== Ecuador ===
- Military ranks of Ecuador

=== Estonia ===
- Military ranks of Estonia

=== Ethiopia ===
- Military ranks of Ethiopia

=== Finland ===
- Finnish military ranks

=== France ===
- French Army ranks
- French Navy ranks
- French Air Force ranks
- French Gendarmerie ranks

=== Gabon ===
- Military ranks of the Armed Forces of Gabon

=== Georgia ===
- Georgian military ranks

=== Germany ===
- Rank insignia of the Bundeswehr
- Ranks of the German Bundeswehr

=== Greece ===
- Greek military ranks

=== Hungary ===
- Hungarian military ranks

=== India ===
- Indian Armed Forces comparative ranks
- Indian Army ranks and insignia
- Indian Navy ranks and insignia
- Indian Air Force ranks and insignia

=== Indonesia ===
- Indonesian military ranks

=== Iran ===
- Military ranks of Iran
- Rank insignia of the Iranian military
- Rank Insignia of the Islamic Revolutionary Guard Corps
- Military ranks of Imperial Iran

=== Iraq ===
- Military ranks of Iraq

=== Ireland ===
- Irish Defence Forces rank insignia

=== Israel ===
- Israel Defense Forces ranks and insignia

=== Italy ===
- Italian Army ranks
- Italian Navy ranks
- Italian Air Force ranks
- Italian Carabinieri ranks
- Italian Finance Guard ranks

=== Japan ===
- Japanese military ranks

=== Jordan ===
- Jordanian military ranks

=== Kenya ===
- Military ranks of Kenya

=== Laos ===
- Military ranks of the Lao People's Armed Forces

=== Latvia ===
- Military ranks of Latvia

=== Lebanon ===
- Military ranks of Lebanon

=== Lithuania ===
- Lithuanian military ranks and insignia

=== Malaysia ===
- Malaysian military ranks

=== Mexico ===
- Military ranks of Mexico

=== Mongolia ===
- Mongolian military ranks

=== Myanmar ===
- Military ranks of Myanmar

=== Nepal ===
- Military ranks of Nepal

=== Netherlands ===
- Military ranks of the Netherlands armed forces

=== New Zealand ===
- New Zealand military ranks

=== Nicaragua ===
- Nicaragua military ranks

=== Nigeria ===
- Military ranks of Nigeria

=== North Korea ===
- Military ranks of North Korea
- Comparative military ranks of Korea

=== Norway ===
- Military ranks and insignia of Norway

=== Pakistan ===
- Pakistan Army ranks and insignia
- Pakistan Navy ranks and insignia
- Pakistan Air Force ranks and insignia

=== Peru ===
- Military ranks of Peru

=== Philippines ===
- Military ranks of the Philippines

=== Poland ===
- Polish Armed Forces rank insignia

=== Portugal ===
- Military ranks of Portugal

=== Romania ===
- Romanian Armed Forces ranks and insignia

=== Russia ===
- Army ranks and insignia of Russia
- Naval ranks and insignia of Russia
- Aerospace Forces ranks and insignia of the Russian Federation

==== Russia (1917-1922) ====
- Army ranks and insignia of White Russia

=== Saudi Arabia ===
- Saudi Arabian military ranks

=== Serbia ===
- Military ranks of Serbia

=== Singapore ===
- Military ranks of Singapore

=== Slovakia ===
- Military ranks of Slovakia

=== Slovenia ===
- Slovenian military ranks

=== Somalia ===
- Military ranks of Somalia

=== Somaliland ===
- Military ranks of Somaliland

=== South Africa ===
- South African military ranks

=== South Korea ===
- Military ranks of South Korea
- Comparative military ranks of Korea

=== Spain ===
- Military ranks of Spain

=== Sri Lanka ===
- Sri Lanka Army rank insignia
- Sri Lanka Navy rank insignia
- Sri Lanka Air Force rank insignia

=== Sweden ===
- Military ranks of the Swedish Armed Forces

=== Switzerland ===
- Military ranks of Switzerland

=== Republic of China (Taiwan) ===
- Republic of China Armed Forces rank insignia

=== Tajikistan ===
- Military ranks of Tajikistan

=== Tanzania ===
- Military ranks of Tanzania

=== Thailand ===
- Military ranks of the Thai armed forces

=== Tunisia ===
- Military ranks of Tunisia

=== Turkey ===
- Military ranks of Turkey

=== Ukraine ===
- Military ranks of Ukraine

=== United Arab Emirates ===
- Military ranks of United Arab Emirates

=== United Kingdom ===
- Royal Navy officer rank insignia; Royal Navy ratings rank insignia
- British Army officer rank insignia; British Army other rank insignia
- Royal Air Force officer ranks; Royal Air Force other ranks
- United Kingdom and United States military ranks compared

=== United States ===
- United States uniformed services: comparative ranks of officers, warrant officers, and enlisted servicemen
- United States Air Force: enlisted, warrant officer, officer
- United States Army: enlisted, warrant officer, officer
- United States Coast Guard: enlisted, warrant officer, officer
- United States Marine Corps: enlisted, warrant officer, officer
- United States Navy: enlisted, warrant officer, officer
- United States Public Health Service Commissioned Corps: officer
- United States Space Force: enlisted, officer
- National Oceanic and Atmospheric Administration Commissioned Officer Corps: officer
- United Kingdom and United States military ranks compared

=== Venezuela ===
- Venezuelan military ranks

=== Vietnam ===
- Vietnamese military ranks and insignia

=== Zambia ===
- Military ranks of Zambia

=== Zimbabwe ===
- Military ranks of Zimbabwe

== Continental comparisons ==
=== Africa ===
- Comparative army officer ranks of Africa
- Comparative army enlisted ranks of Africa
- Comparative air force officer ranks of Africa
- Comparative air force enlisted ranks of Africa
- Comparative navy officer ranks of Africa
- Comparative navy enlisted ranks of Africa

=== Americas ===
- Comparative army officer ranks of the Americas
- Comparative army enlisted ranks of the Americas
- Comparative air force officer ranks of the Americas
- Comparative air force enlisted ranks of the Americas
- Comparative navy officer ranks of the Americas
- Comparative navy enlisted ranks of the Americas

=== Asia ===
- Comparative army officer ranks of Asia
- Comparative army enlisted ranks of Asia
- Comparative air force officer ranks of Asia
- Comparative air force enlisted ranks of Asia
- Comparative navy officer ranks of Asia
- Comparative navy enlisted ranks of Asia

=== Europe ===
- Comparative army officer ranks of Europe
- Comparative army enlisted ranks of Europe
- Comparative air force officer ranks of Europe
- Comparative air force enlisted ranks of Europe
- Comparative navy officer ranks of Europe
- Comparative navy enlisted ranks of Europe

=== Oceania ===
- Comparative army officer ranks of Oceania
- Comparative army enlisted ranks of Oceania
- Comparative air force officer ranks of Oceania
- Comparative air force enlisted ranks of Oceania
- Comparative navy officer ranks of Oceania
- Comparative navy enlisted ranks of Oceania

== Other comparisons ==
=== NATO ===
- Ranks and insignia of NATO
- Ranks and insignia of NATO armies officers
- Ranks and insignia of NATO armies enlisted
- Ranks and insignia of NATO Air Forces Officers
- Ranks and insignia of NATO Air Forces Enlisted
- Ranks and insignia of officers of NATO navies
- Ranks and insignia of NATO Navies Enlisted

=== Commonwealth of Nations ===
- Comparative army officer ranks of the Commonwealth
- Comparative army enlisted ranks of the Commonwealth
- Comparative air force officer ranks of the Commonwealth
- Comparative air force enlisted ranks of the Commonwealth
- Comparative navy officer ranks of the Commonwealth
- Comparative navy enlisted ranks of the Commonwealth

=== Armed forces comparison ===
- Ranks and insignia of gendarmeries
- Ranks and insignia of marine forces
- Ranks and insignia of space forces

== Previous eras ==
=== Miscellaneous ===
- Imperial Roman legion's ranks
- Military ranks of the Ottoman Empire
- Confederate Army during the civil war
- Confederate Navy during the civil war
- Rank insignia of the Austro-Hungarian armed forces
- Ranks in the Austro-Hungarian Navy
- Royal Navy during the 18th and 19th centuries
- South Vietnamese military ranks and insignia
- United States (Union) Army during the civil war
- United States (Union) Navy during the civil war
- Ranks and insignia of the Imperial Russian Armed Forces
- Military ranks of the Soviet Union

=== First and Second World War comparisons ===
- Comparative officer ranks of World War I
- Military ranks of the Ottoman Empire
- Comparative officer ranks of World War II
  - Military ranks of women's services in WWII
- Comparative ranks of Nazi Germany
  - Uniforms and insignia of the Kriegsmarine
  - Ranks and insignia of the German Army (1935–1945)
  - Ranks and insignia of the Luftwaffe (1935–1945)
  - Corps colours of the German Army (1935–1945)
  - Corps colours of the Luftwaffe (1935–1945)
- Ranks and insignia of the Imperial Russian Armed Forces
- Military ranks of the Soviet Union
- Japan - army ranks of the Japanese Empire during World War II
- Japan - naval ranks of the Japanese Empire during World War II
- United States Army enlisted rank insignia of World War I
- United States Army enlisted rank insignia of World War II
