= Rank insignia of the Guardia di Finanza =

The rank insignia of the Guardia di Finanza are worn on jackets and shoulder epaulettes.

== Rank structure ==
=== Officers ===
NATO code	OF-10	OF-9	OF-8		OF-7	OF-6	OF-5	OF-4	OF-3	OF-2		OF-1
	Officers
	Generals						Senior officers			Junior officers
Italy
Italy		Comandante generale della Guardia di finanza^{1}	Vicecomandante generale della Guardia di finanza^{2}	Generale di corpo d'armata	Generale di divisione	Generale di brigata	Colonnello	Tenente colonnello	Maggiore	Primo capitano	Capitano	Tenente	Sottotenente
Italy		Corps commanding general	Deputy corps commanding general	Corps general	Divisional general	Brigade general	Colonel	Lieutenant colonel	Major	First captain	Captain	Lieutenant	Sub-lieutenant
Notes:
^{1} The duty of "comandante generale della Guardia di finanza" (corps commanding general) is assigned to a single "generale di corpo d'armata" (corps general).
^{2} The duty of "vicecomandante generale della Guardia di finanza" (deputy corps commanding general) is assigned to a single "generale di corpo d'armata" (corps general).

=== Non-commissioned officers ===
Sub-officers										Ratings
Role	Inspectors					Superintendents				Appointees and financiers
NATO Code	OR-9			OR-8		OR-7		OR-6	OR-5	OR-4
Insignia
Italian rank name	Luogotenente^{1} s.u.p.s.	Maresciallo aiutante s.u.p.s.^{2}	Maresciallo capo	Maresciallo ordinario	Maresciallo	Brigadiere capo qualifica speciale	Brigadiere capo	Brigadiere	Vice brigadiere	Appuntato scelto	Appuntato	Finanziere scelto	Finanziere^{3}
English rank name translation	sub-lieutenant s.o.p.s.	marshal adjutant s.o.p.s.	chief marshal	ordinary marshal	marshal	chief brigadier special qualification	chief brigadier	brigadier	vice-brigadier	chosen appointee	appointee	chosen financier	financier
Notes:^{1} The duty of a sostituto ufficiale di pubblica sicurezza luogotenente (substitute officer of public security sub-lieutenant) is not a rank but a position (or function) attributed only to NCOs with the rank of "maresciallo aiutante" (marshal adjutant) with at least 15 years of experience in the rank.^{2} The title of "sostituto ufficiale di pubblica sicurezza" or s.u.p.s. (substitute officer of public security – s.o.p.s.) is not a rank but a position attributed only to NCOs with the rank of "maresciallo aiutante".^{3} A simple financier does not wear rank insignia

== See also ==
- Italian Army ranks
- Italian Navy ranks
- Italian Air Force ranks
- Rank insignia of the Arm of Carabineers
