= Comparative army officer ranks of Oceania =

Rank comparison chart of officer ranks for armies/ land forces of Oceanian states.

== Officers ==
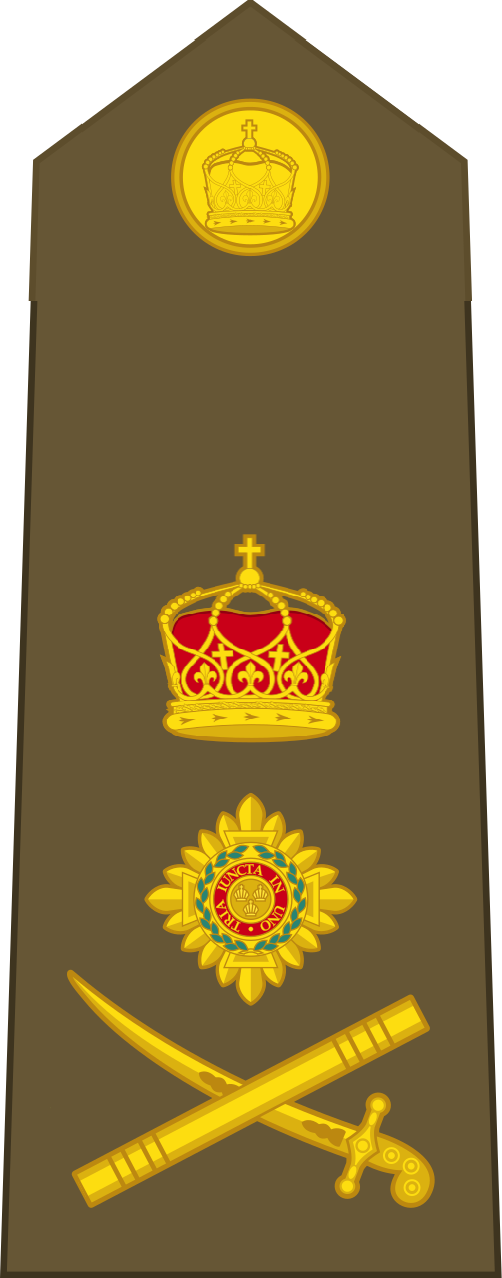
Rank group	General / flag officers					Senior officers			Junior officers
Australian Army
Australian Army	Field marshal	General	Lieutenant general	Major general	Brigadier	Colonel	Lieutenant colonel	Major	Captain	Lieutenant	Second lieutenant
Federated States of Micronesia	No army
Fiji Infantry Regiment
Fiji Infantry Regiment				Major general	Brigadier	Colonel	Lieutenant colonel	Major	Captain	Lieutenant	Second lieutenant
Fiji Infantry Regiment				Jenerali meja	Brigadi	Kanala	Leteni kanala	Meja	Kavetani	Leteni	Ikarua ni leteni
Kiribati	No army
Marshall Islands	No army
Nauru	No army
New Zealand Army
New Zealand Army	Field marshal		Lieutenant-general	Major-general	Brigadier	Colonel	Lieutenant-colonel	Major	Captain	Lieutenant	Second lieutenant
Palau	No army
Papua New Guinea Land Element
Papua New Guinea Land Element				Major general	Brigadier general	Colonel	Lieutenant colonel	Major	Captain	First lieutenant	Second lieutenant
Papua New Guinea Land Element				Meja jeneral	Brigadia jeneral	Kolonel	Leftenan kolonel	Meja	Kepten	Leftenan	Namba tu leftenan
Samoa	No army
Solomon Islands	No army
Tongan Land Component
Tongan Land Component		Commander-in-chief			Brigadier general	Colonel	Lieutenant colonel	Major	Captain	Lieutenant	Ensign
Tongan Land Component		Komanitā-pule			Pilikaria seniale	Kenolo	Lafitani kenolo	Mesia	Kapiteni	Lafitani	Lafitani ua
Tuvalu	No army
Vanuatu Mobile Forces
Vanuatu Mobile Forces				Major general Bigfala Jenerol	Brigadier	Colonel; Kolonel	Lieutenant colonel Lietnen Kolonel	Major; Bigfala	Captain; Kapten	First lieutenant Fas Lietnen	Second lieutenant Seken Lietnen
Rank group	General / flag officers					Senior officers			Junior officers

== See also ==
- Comparative army officer ranks of the Americas
- Ranks and insignia of NATO armies officers
