= Military ranks of the Lao People's Armed Forces =

The following tables present the ranks of the Lao People's Armed Forces, which, as a former French dominion, follow a rank system similar to those used by the French Armed Forces. The design closely follows the Soviet pattern, with two important exceptions: 1) senior officers have a broad coloured stripe instead of two narrow stripes used in the Soviet model; 2) stars are of equal size for all the ranks.

== Officers ==
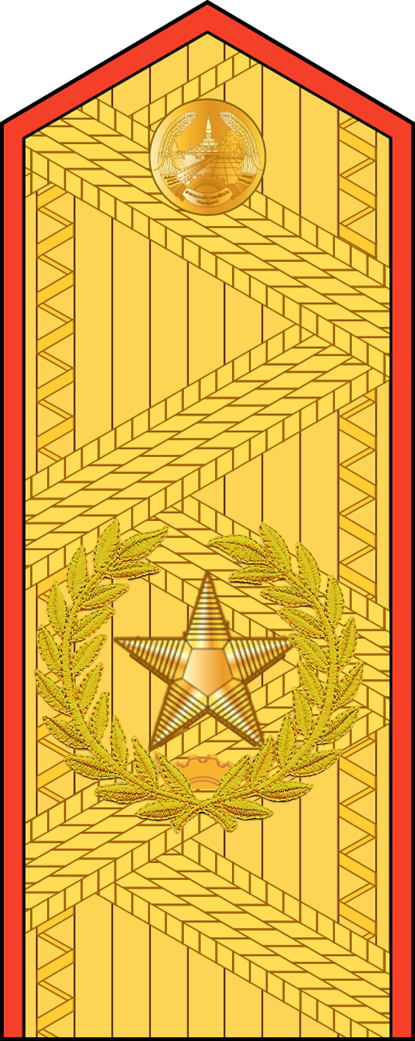
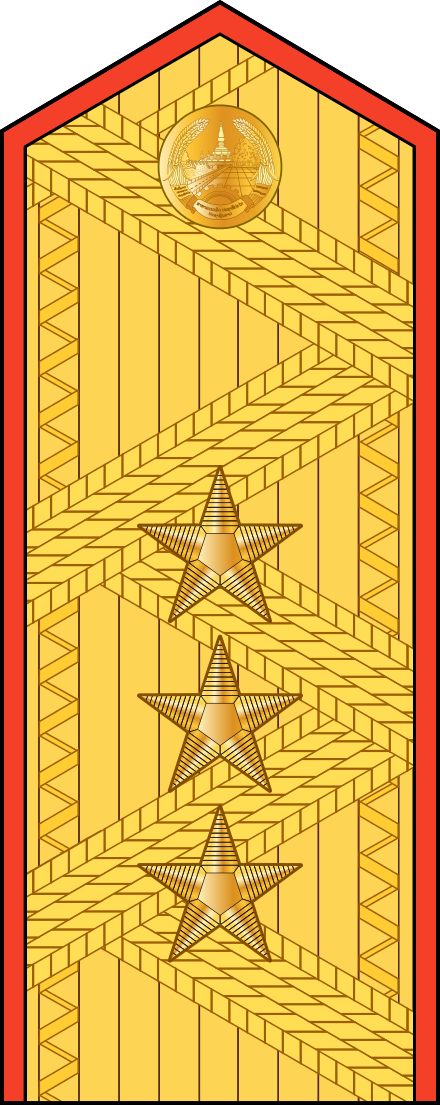
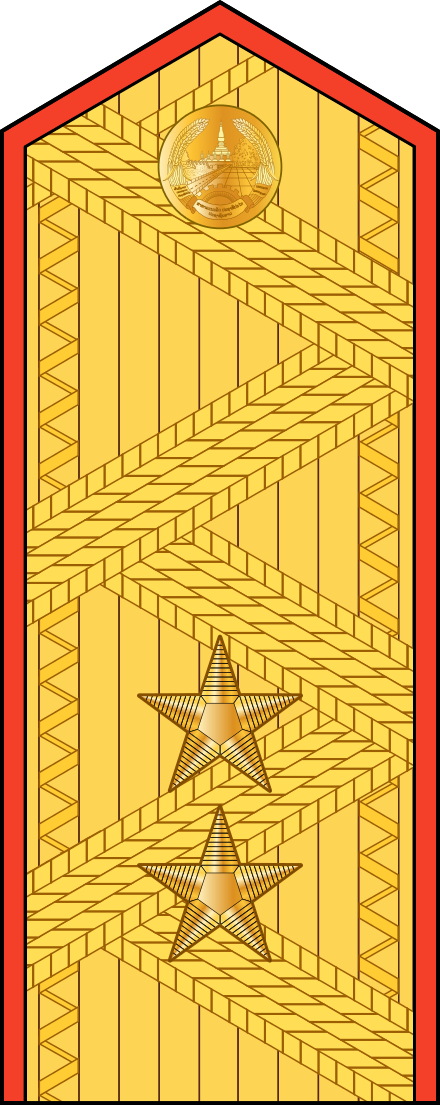
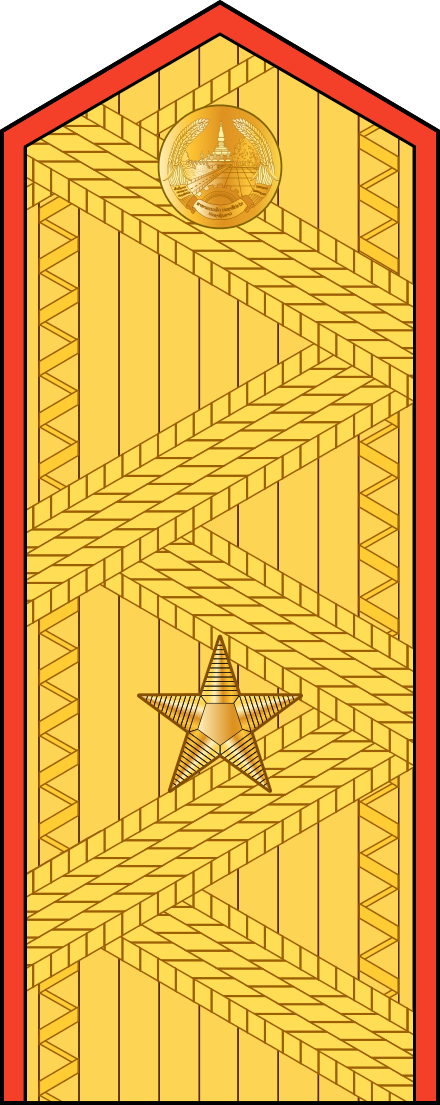
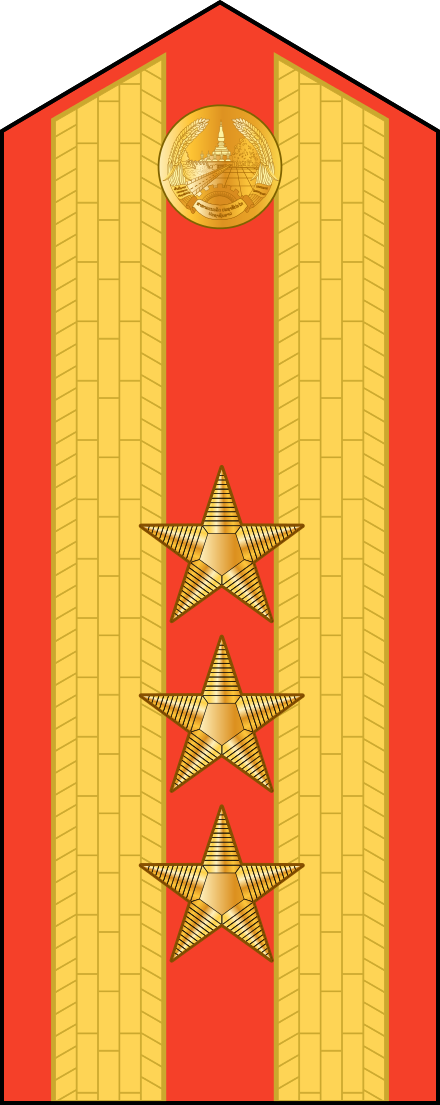
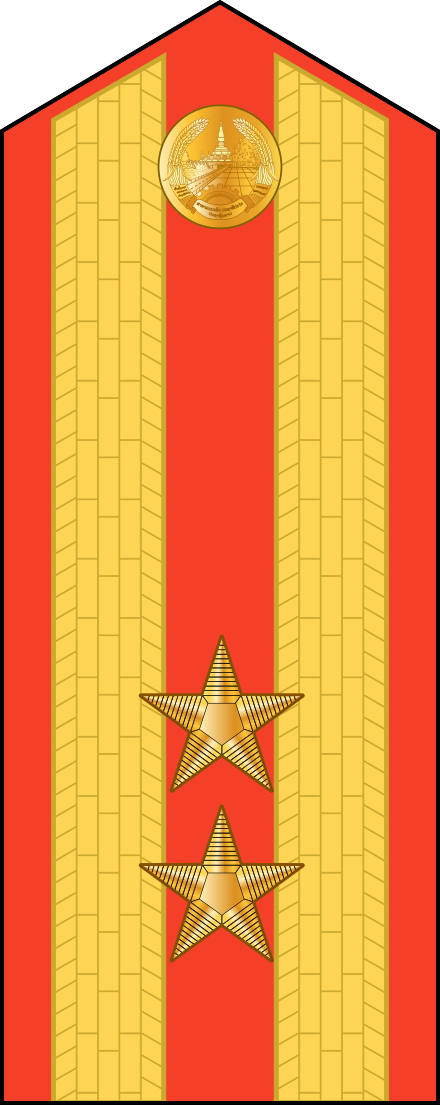
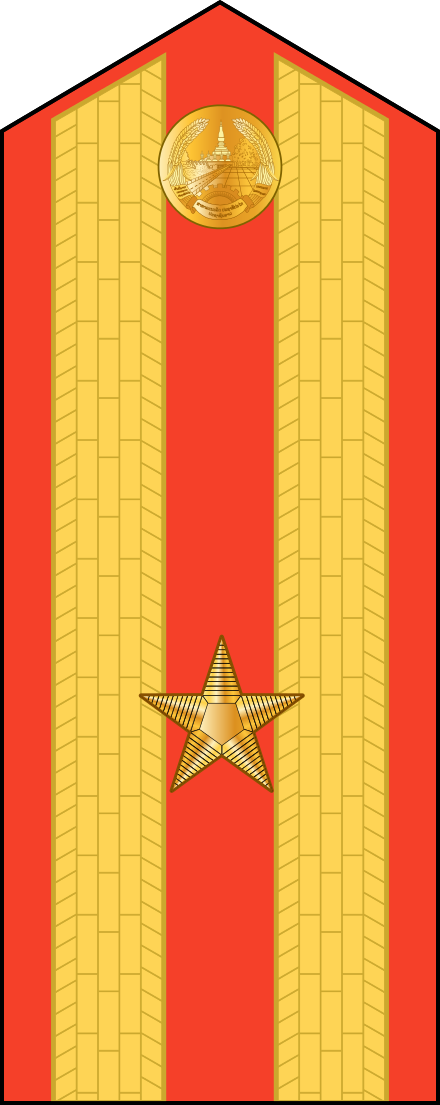
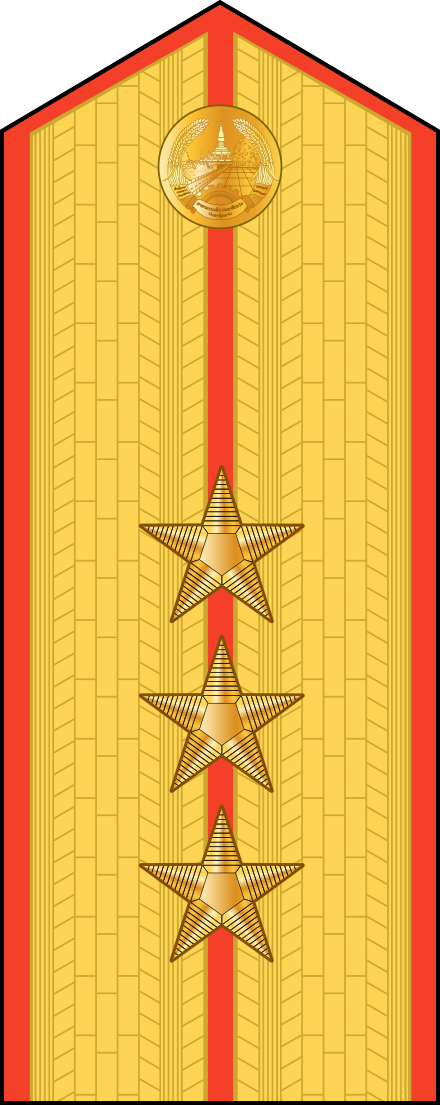
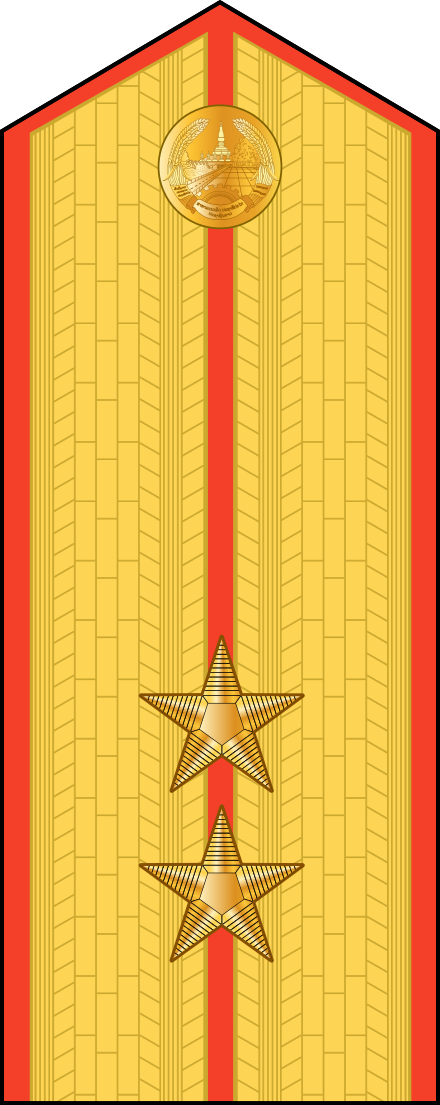
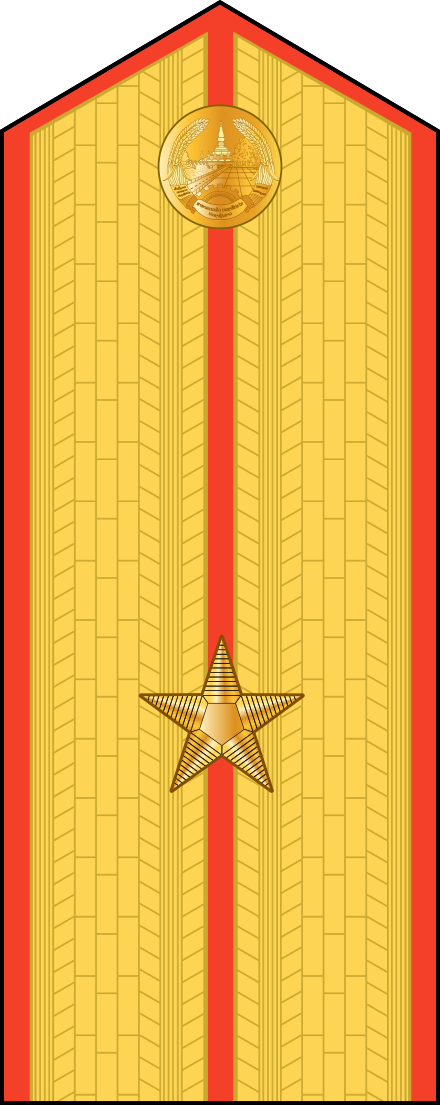
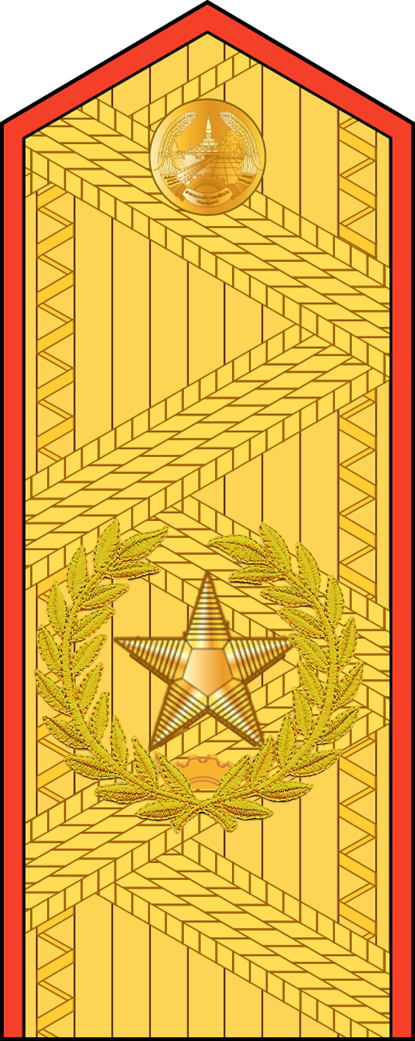
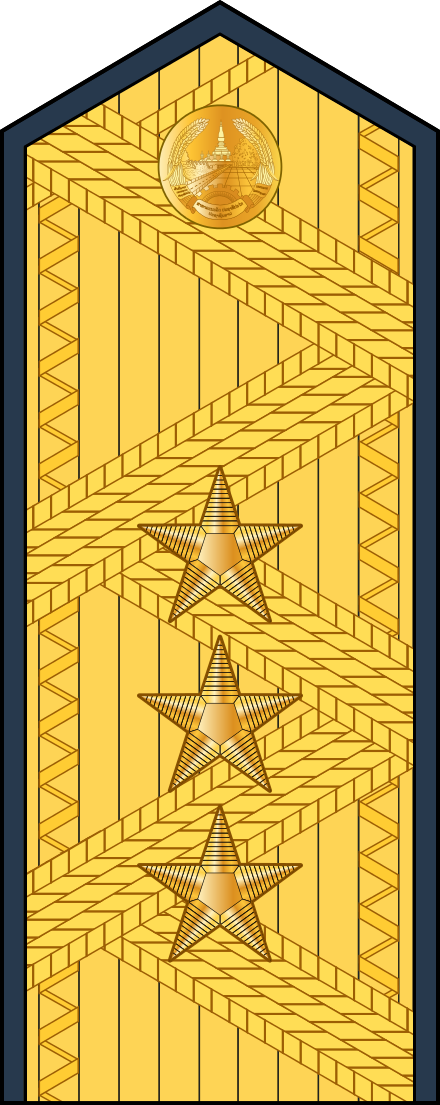
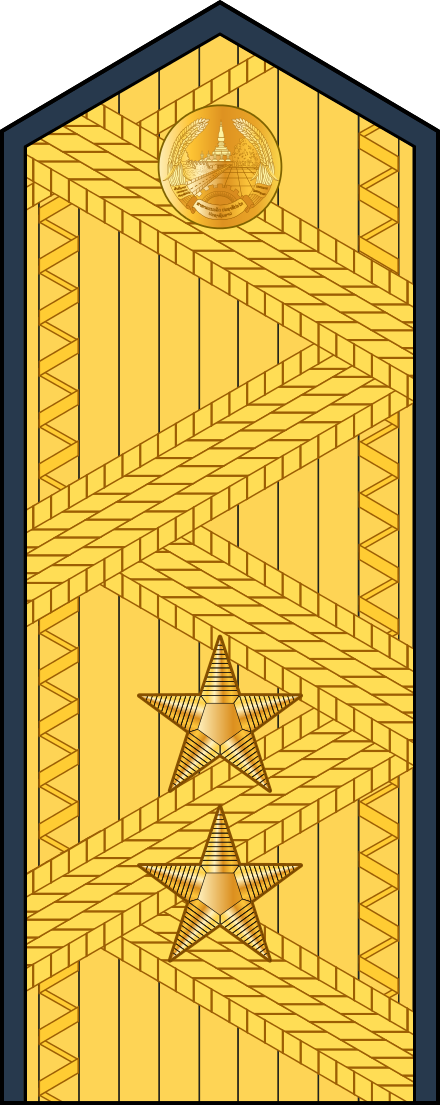
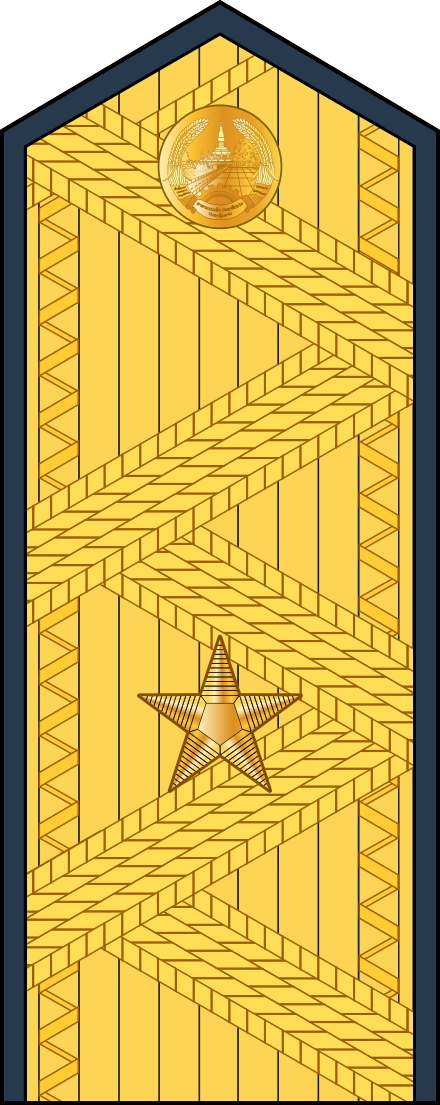
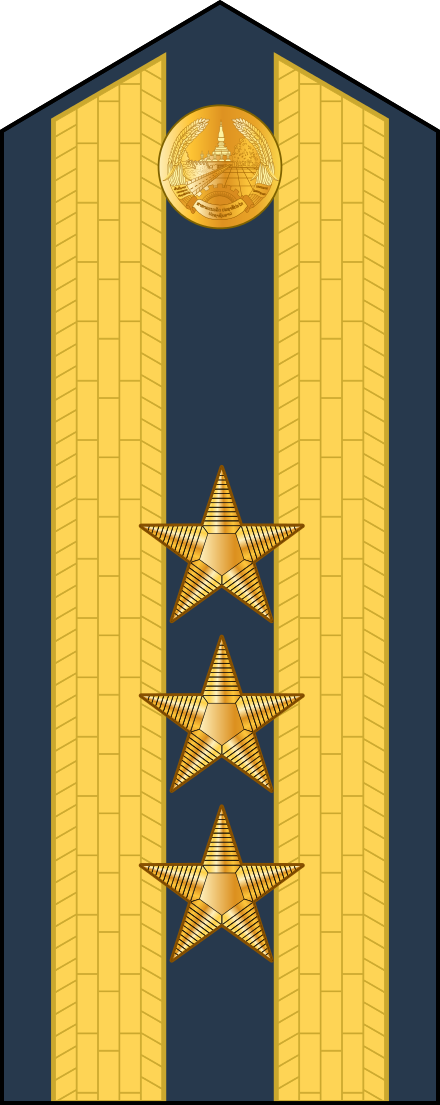
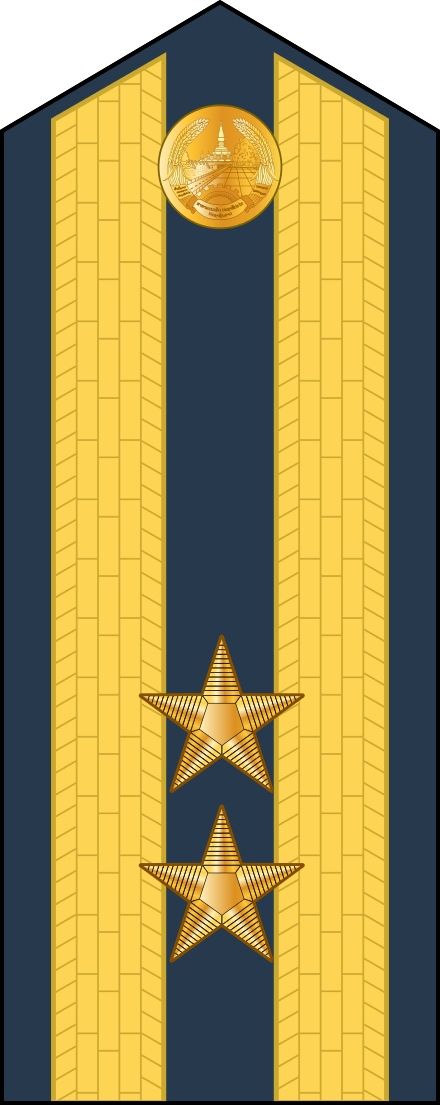
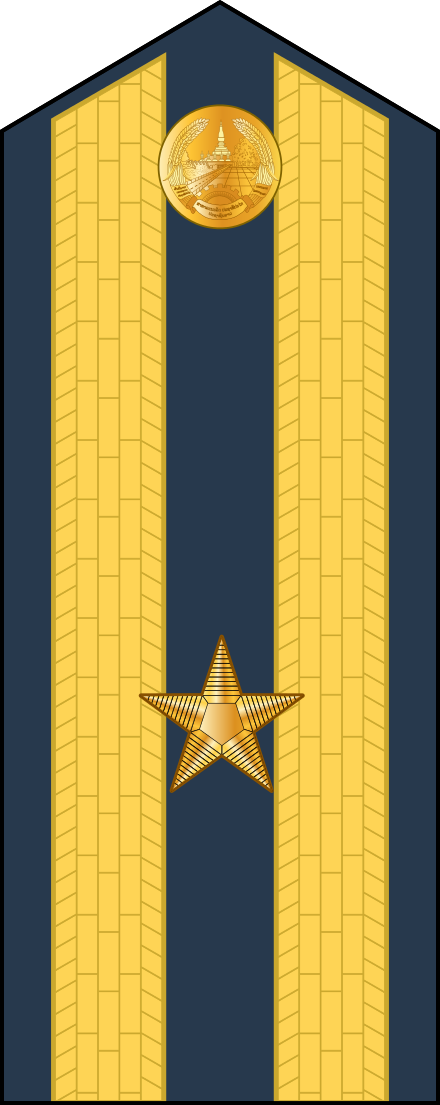
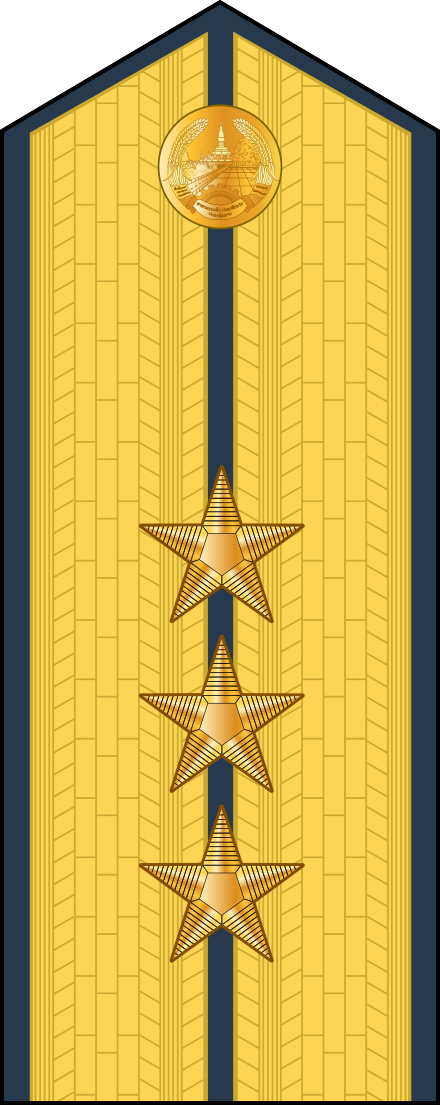
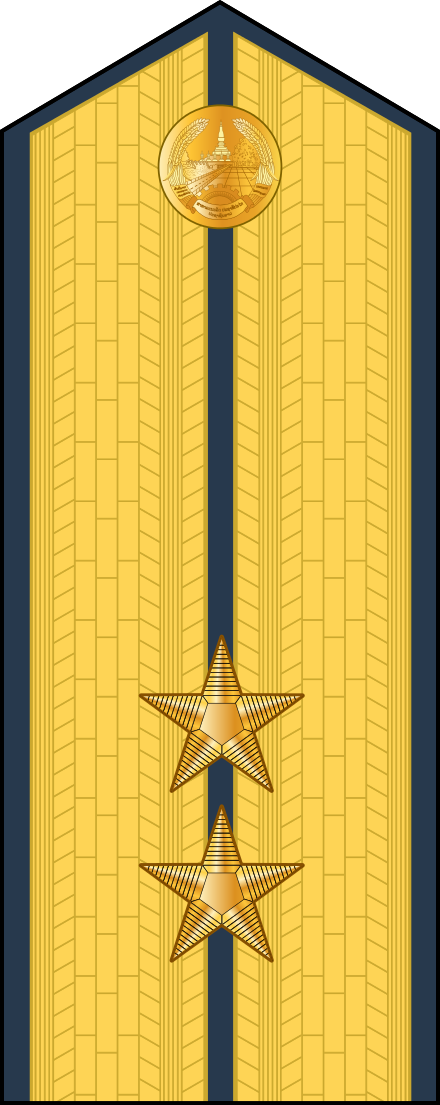
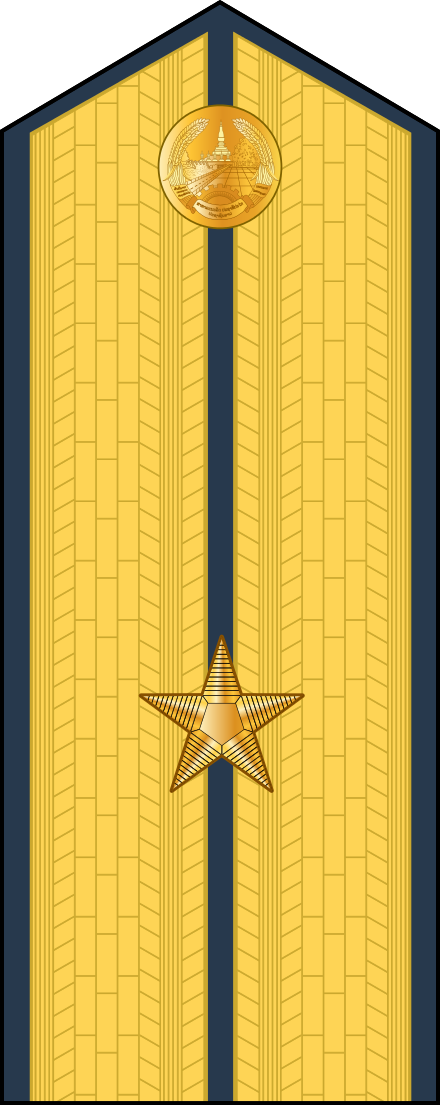
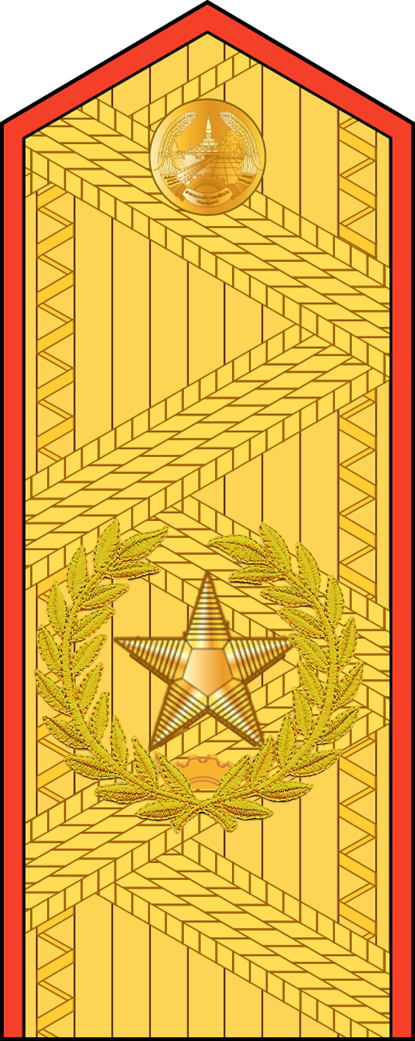
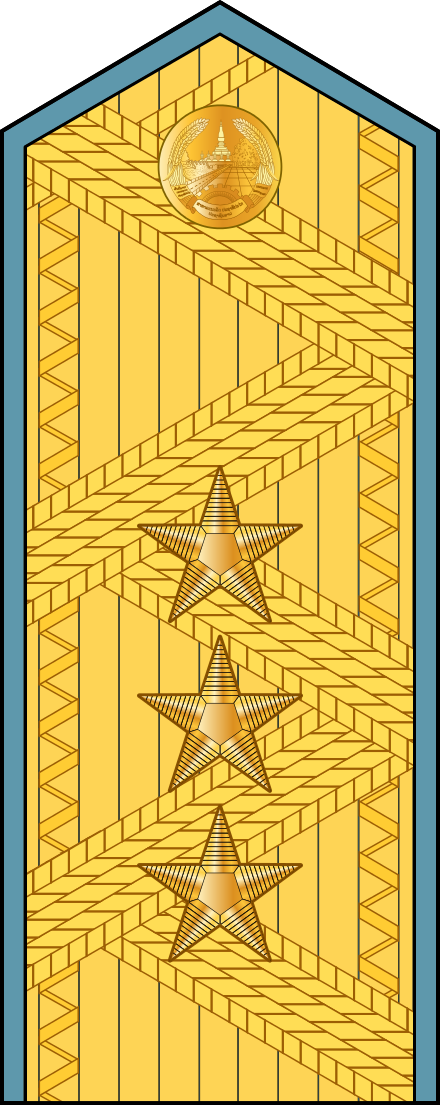
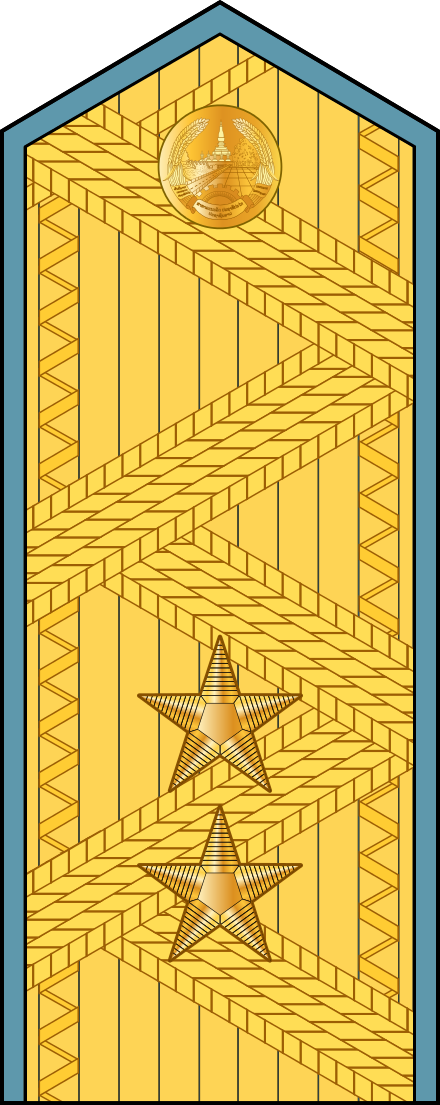
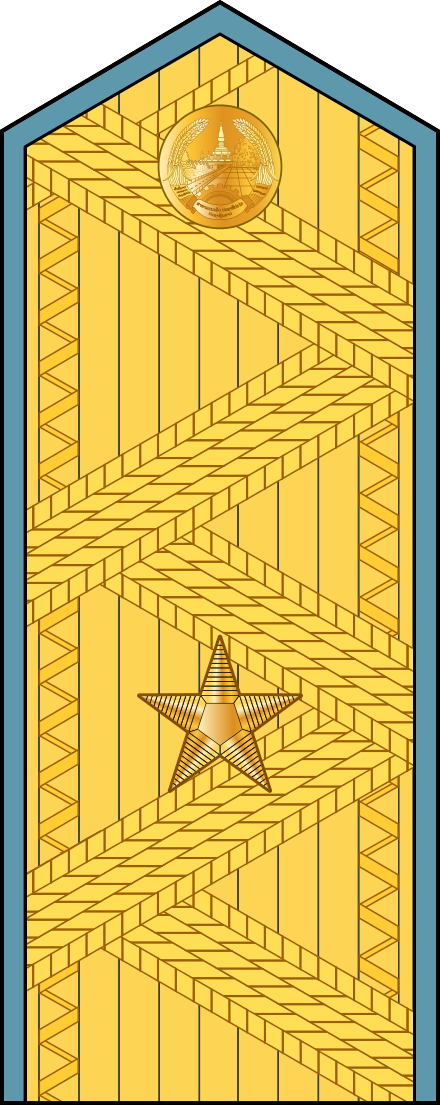
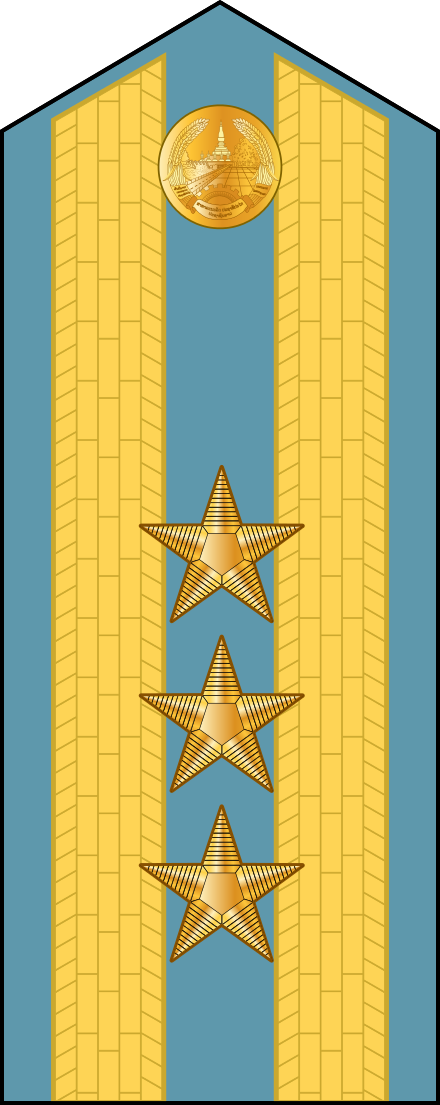
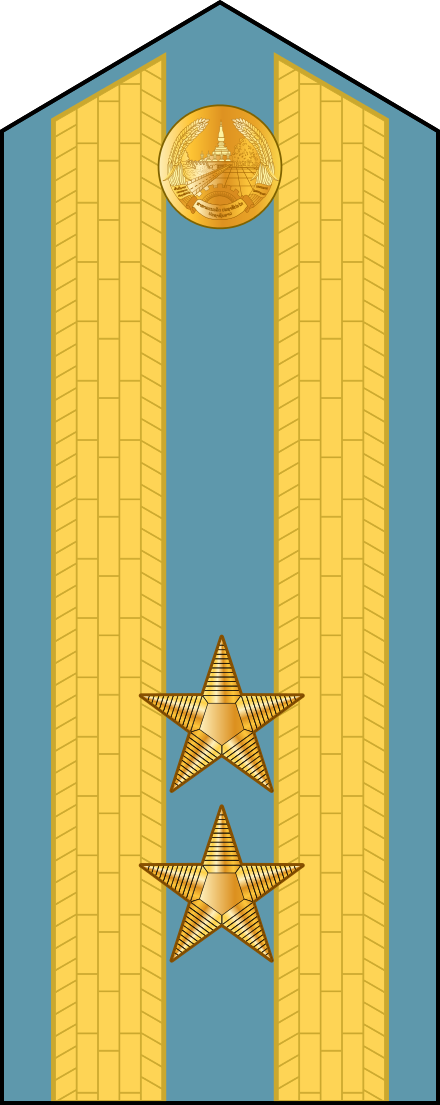
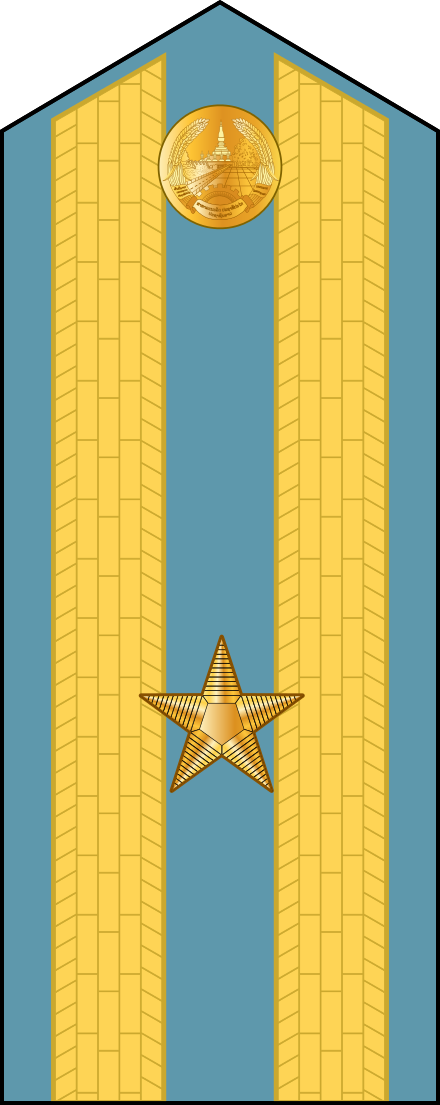
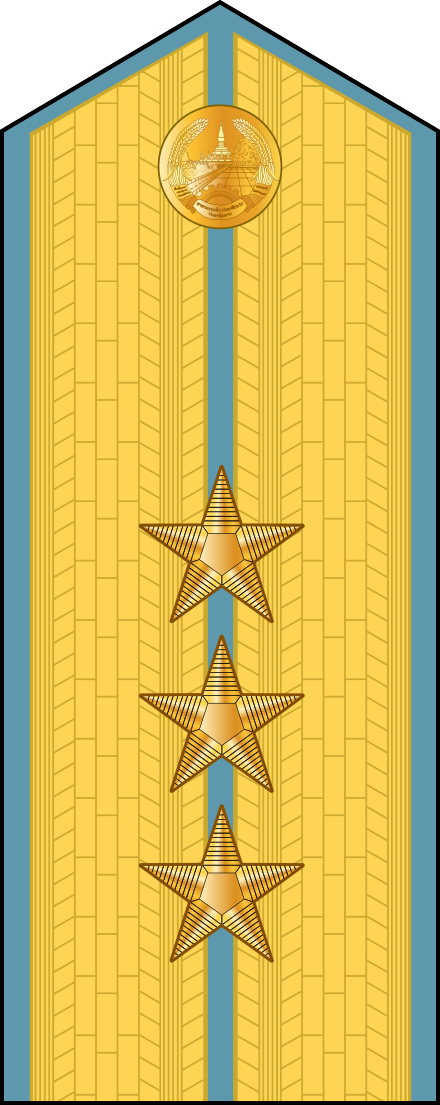
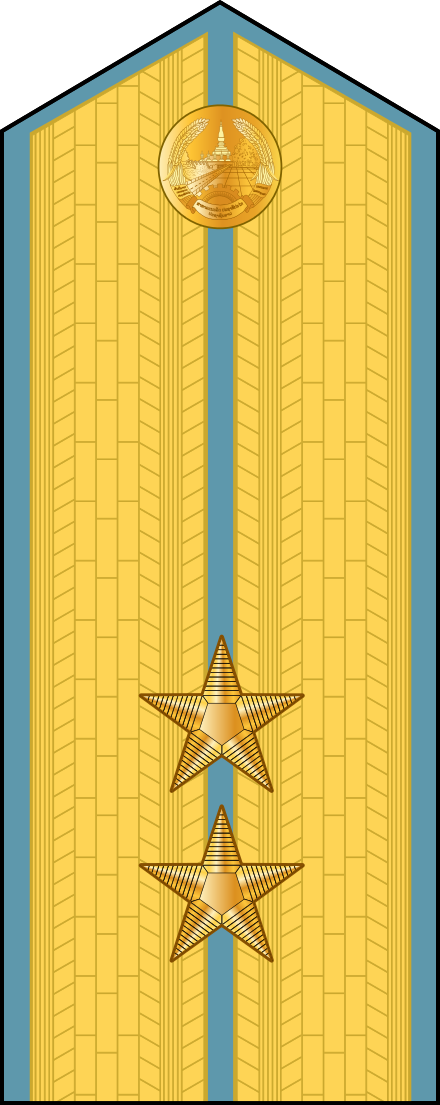
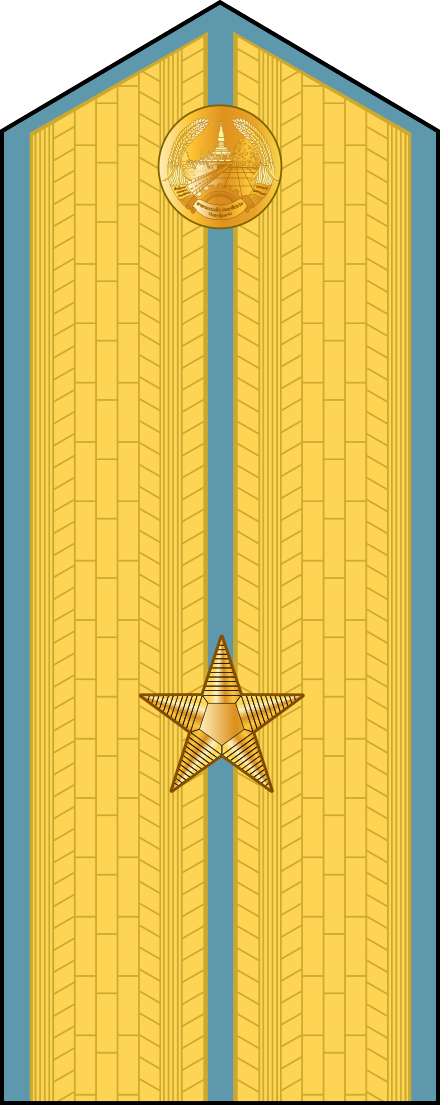
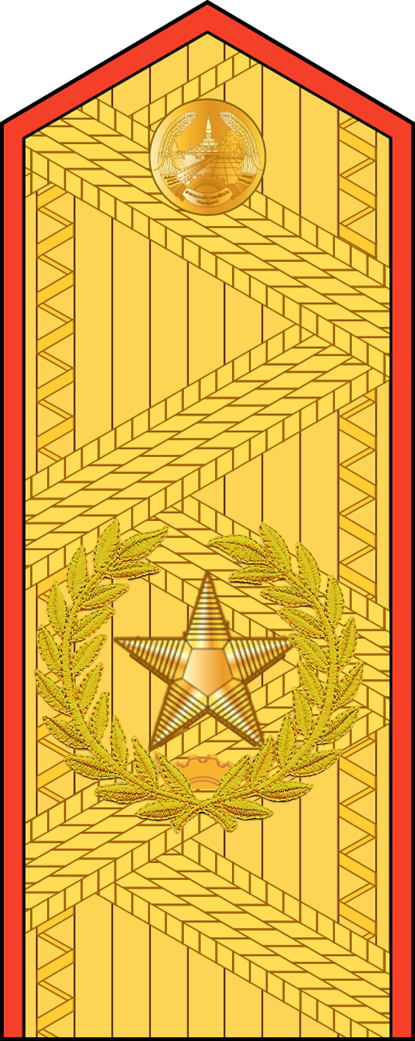
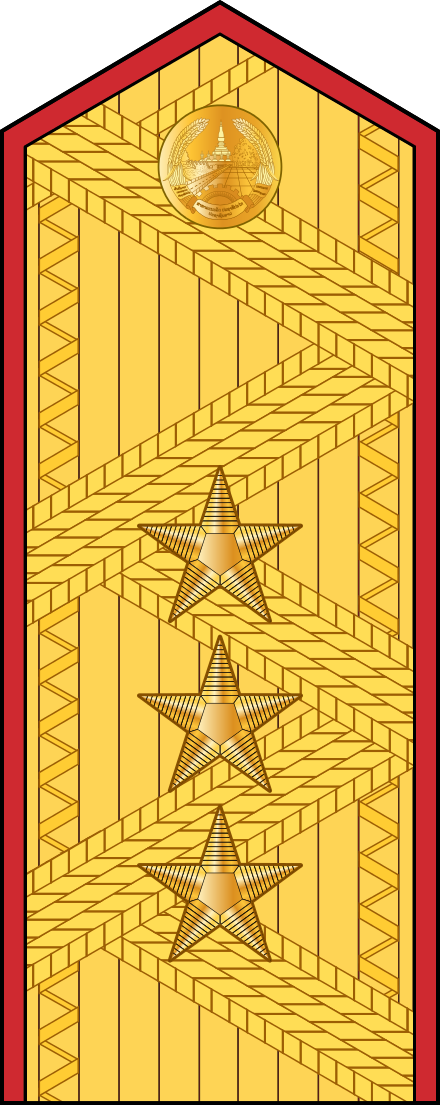
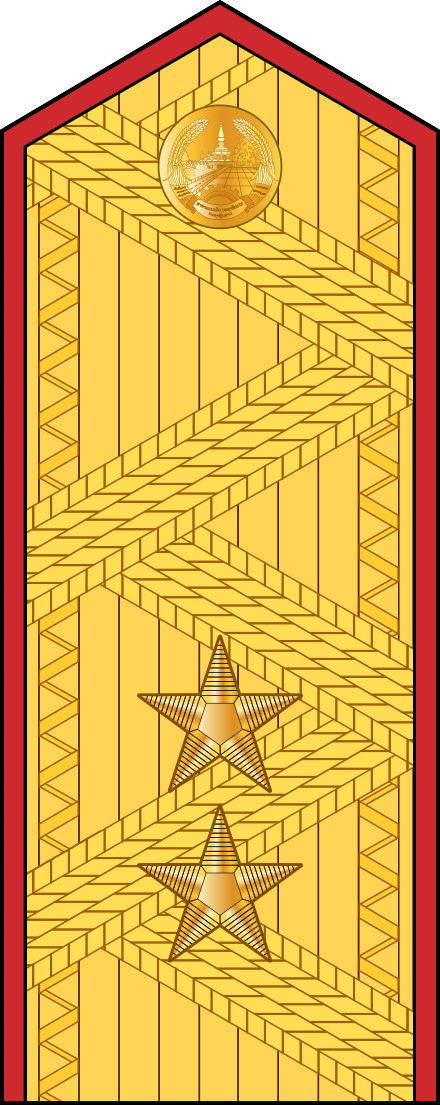
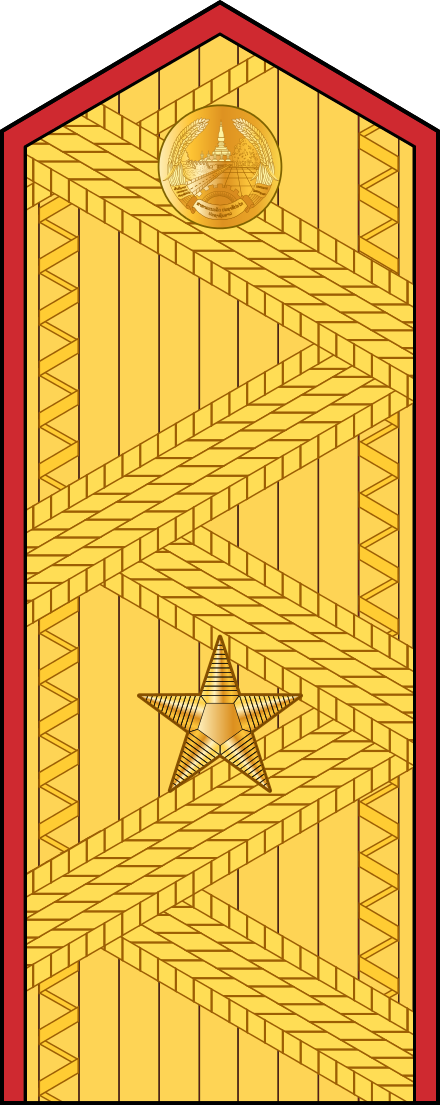
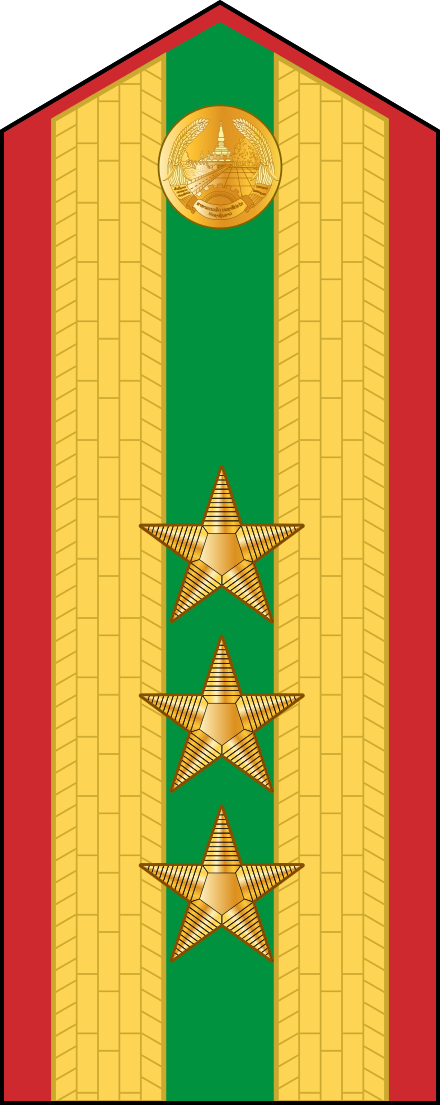
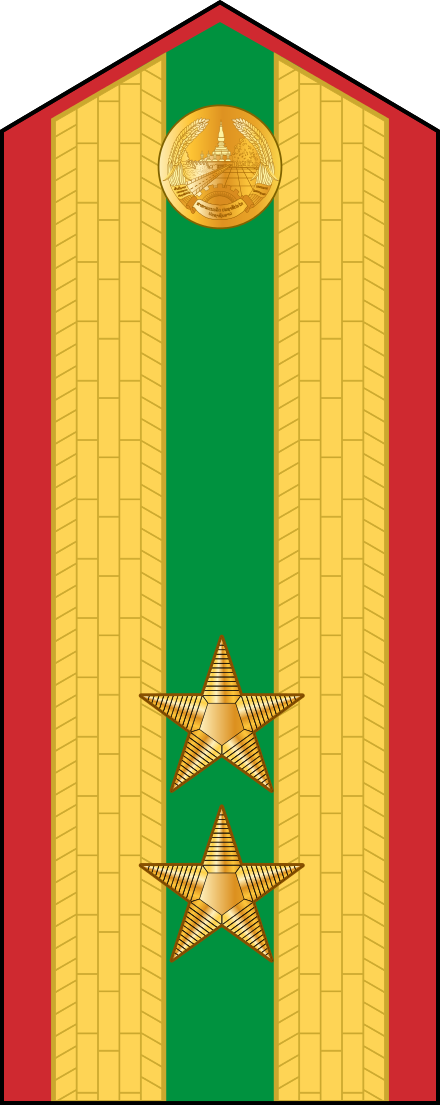
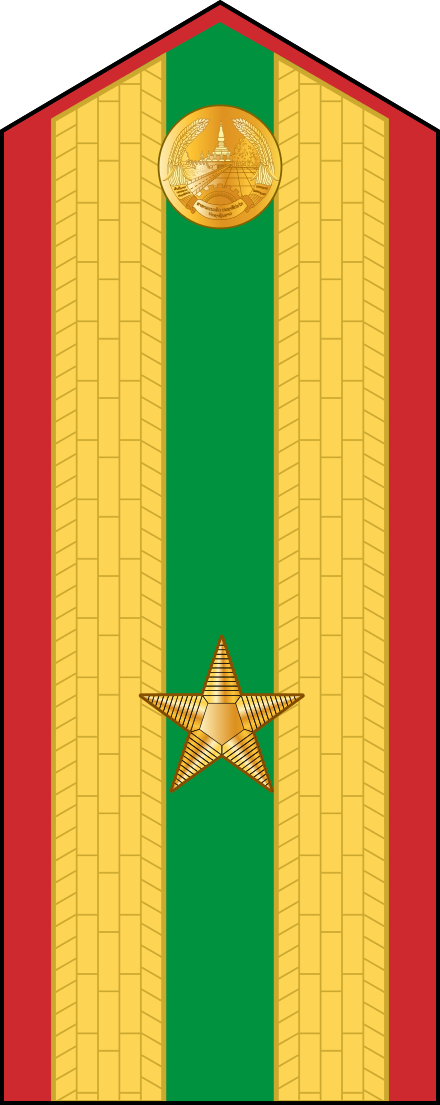
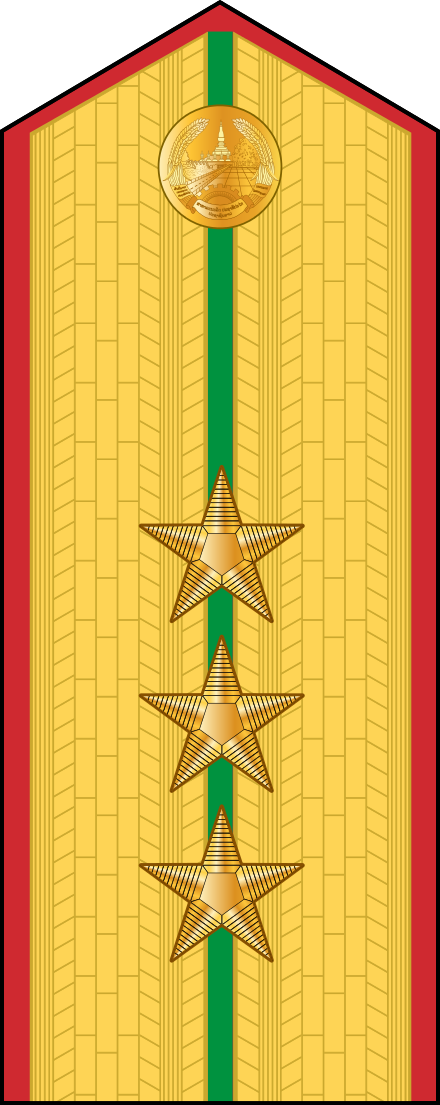
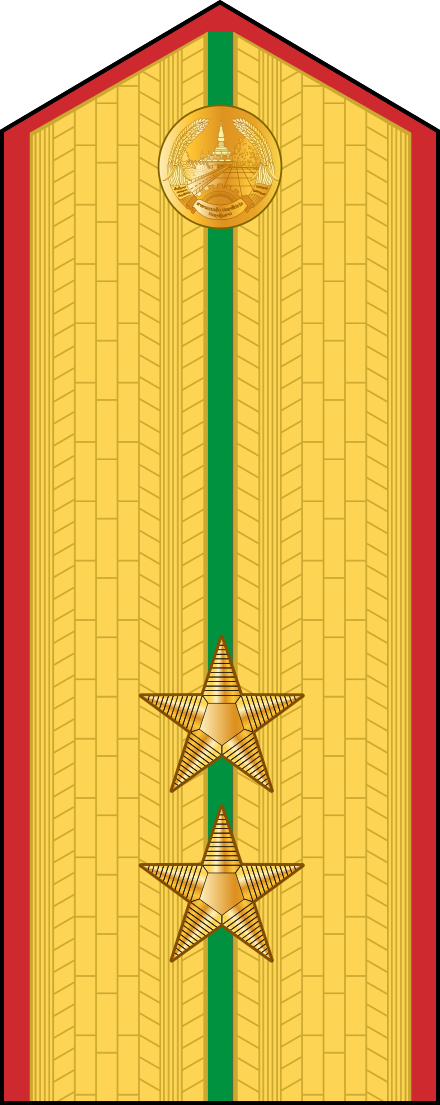
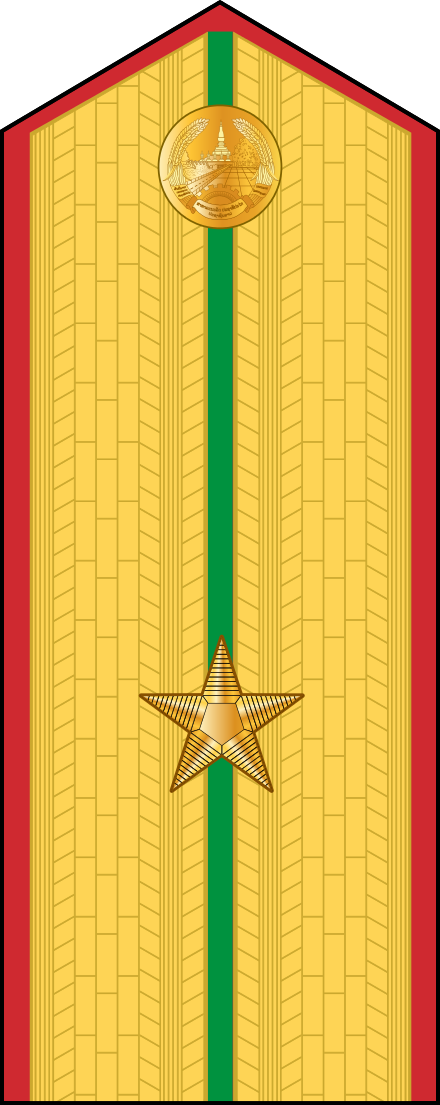
Rank group	General / flag officers				Senior officers			Junior officers
Lao People's Army
Lao People's Army	ພົນເອກ; Phonoek	ພົນໂທ; Phonoth	ພົນຕີ Phon ti	ພົນຈັດຕະວາ; Phonchadtauaa	ພັນເອກ; Phanoek	ພັນໂທ; Phanoth	ພັນຕີ Phan ti	ຮ້ອຍເອກ; Honyoek	ຮ້ອຍໂທ; Hony oth	ຮ້ອຍຕີ Hony ti
(Laos) Lao People's Navy
(Laos) Lao People's Navy	ພົນເອກ; Phonoek	ພົນໂທ; Phonoth	ພົນຕີ Phon ti	ພົນຈັດຕະວາ; Phonchadtauaa	ພັນເອກ; Phanoek	ພັນໂທ; Phanoth	ພັນຕີ Phan ti	ຮ້ອຍເອກ; Honyoek	ຮ້ອຍໂທ; Hony oth	ຮ້ອຍຕີ Hony ti
Lao People's Liberation Air Force
Lao People's Liberation Air Force	ພົນເອກ; Phonoek	ພົນໂທ; Phonoth	ພົນຕີ Phon ti	ພົນຈັດຕະວາ; Phonchadtauaa	ພັນເອກ; Phanoek	ພັນໂທ; Phanoth	ພັນຕີ Phan ti	ຮ້ອຍເອກ; Honyoek	ຮ້ອຍໂທ; Hony oth	ຮ້ອຍຕີ Hony ti
Laos Police
Laos Police	ພົນເອກ; Phonoek	ພົນໂທ; Phonoth	ພົນຕີ Phon ti	ພົນຈັດຕະວາ; Phonchadtauaa	ພັນເອກ; Phanoek	ພັນໂທ; Phanoth	ພັນຕີ Phan ti	ຮ້ອຍເອກ; Honyoek	ຮ້ອຍໂທ; Hony oth	ຮ້ອຍຕີ Hony ti
Rank group	General / flag officers				Senior officers			Junior officers

=== Pre-1983 general ranks ===
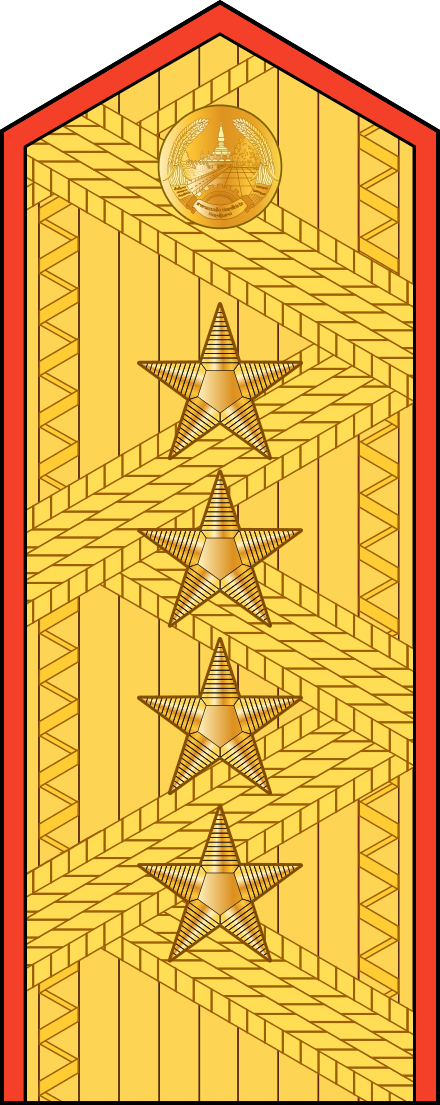
Laos People's Army Phonoek rank insignia 1975-1983

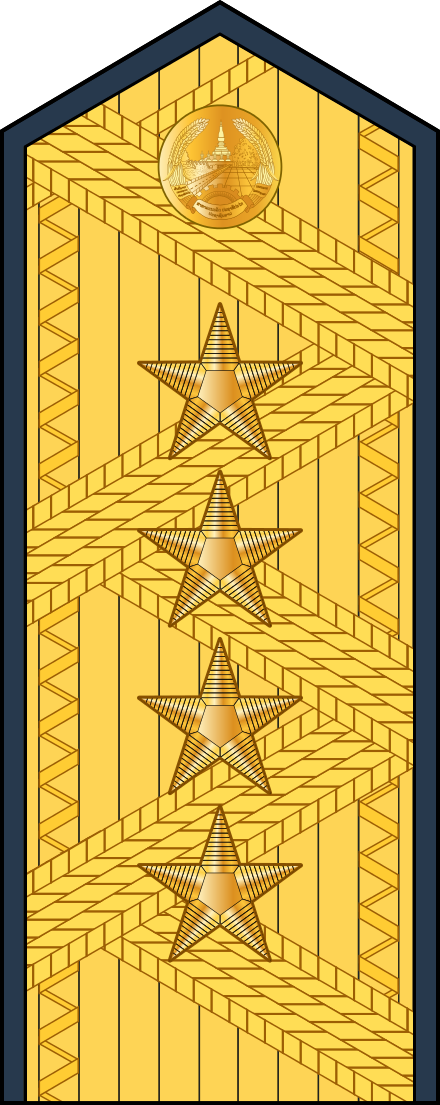
Laos People's Navy Phonoek rank insignia 1975-1983

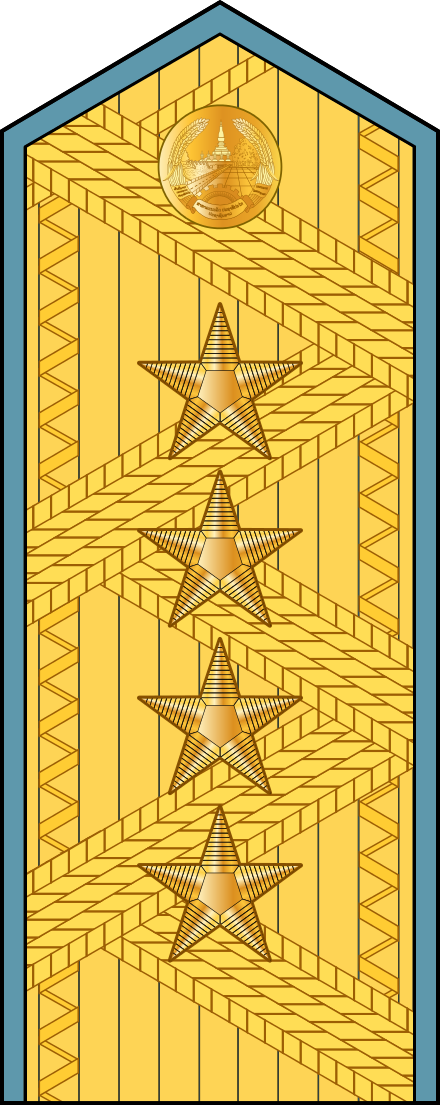
Laos People's Air Force Phonoek rank insignia 1975-1983

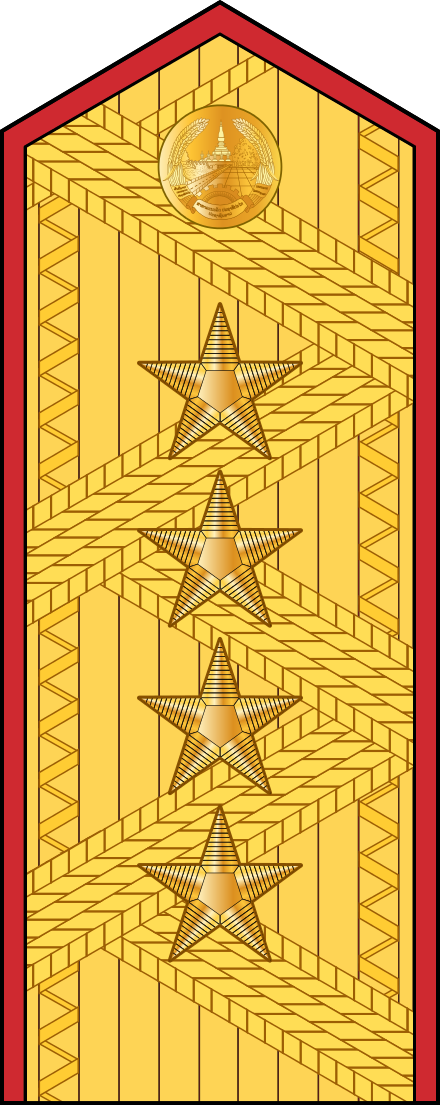
Laos People's Police Phonoek rank insignia 1975-1983

== Enlisted ==
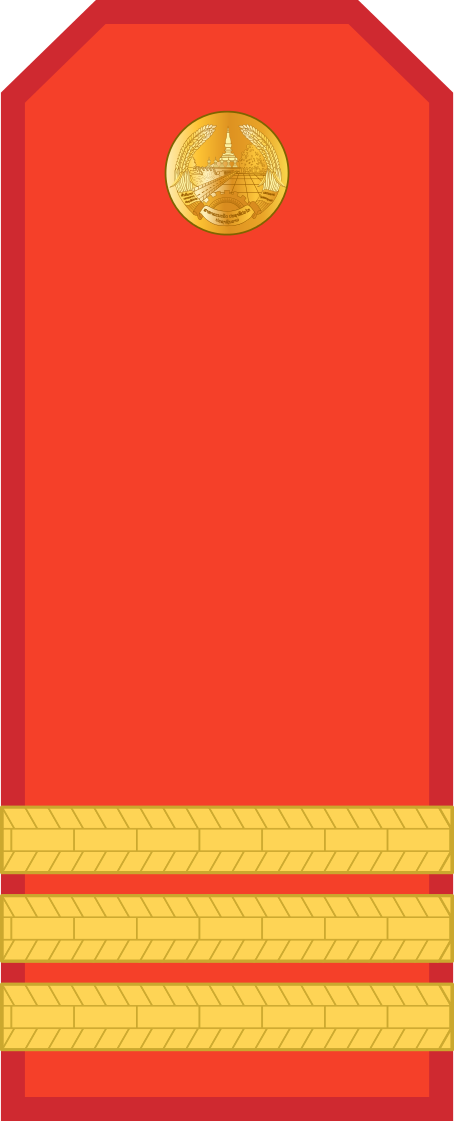
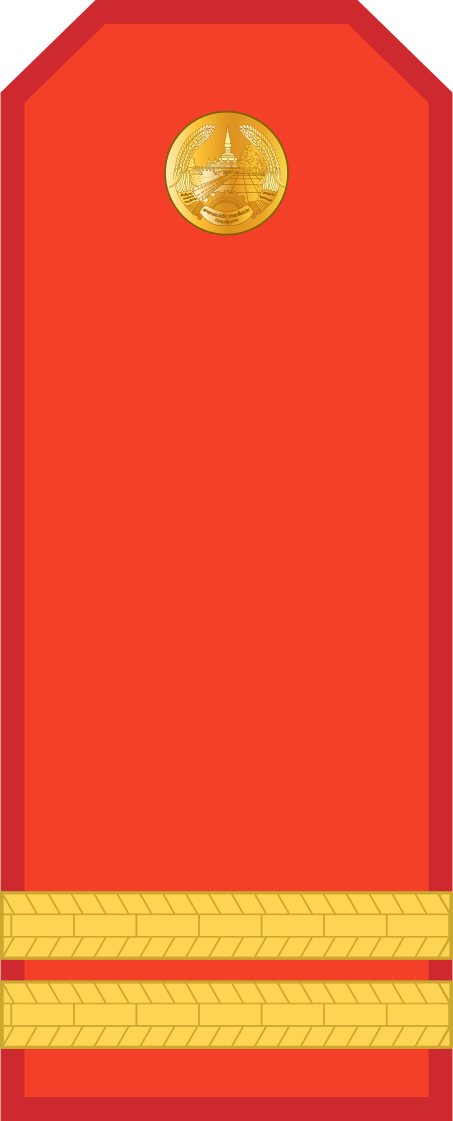
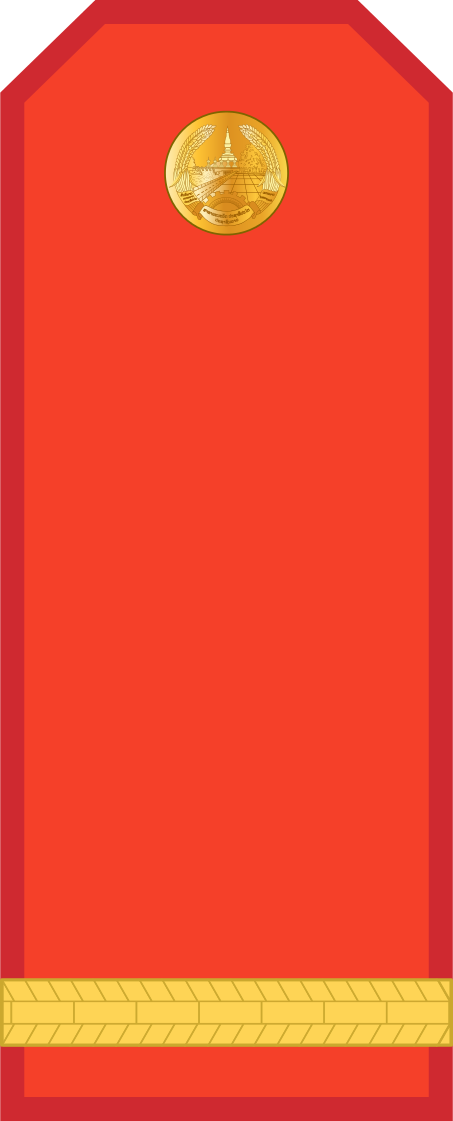
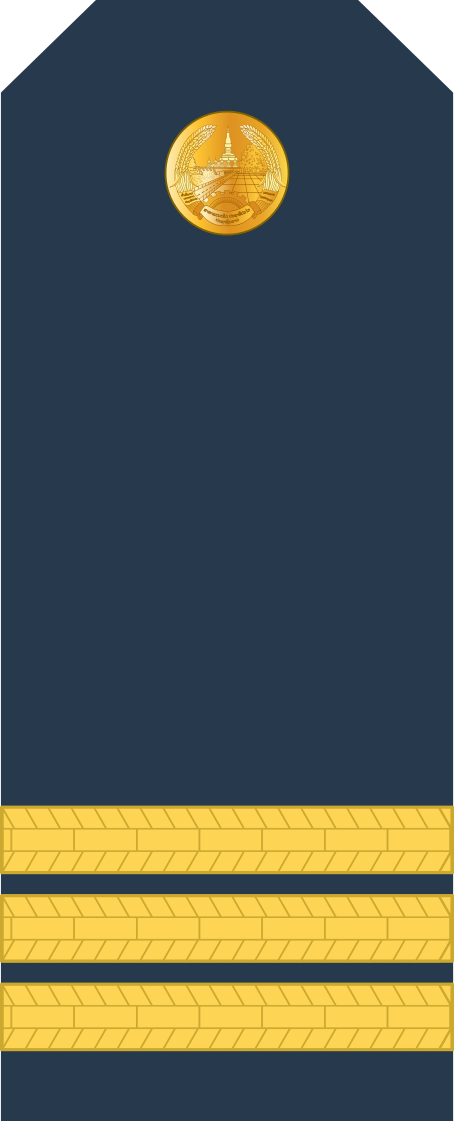
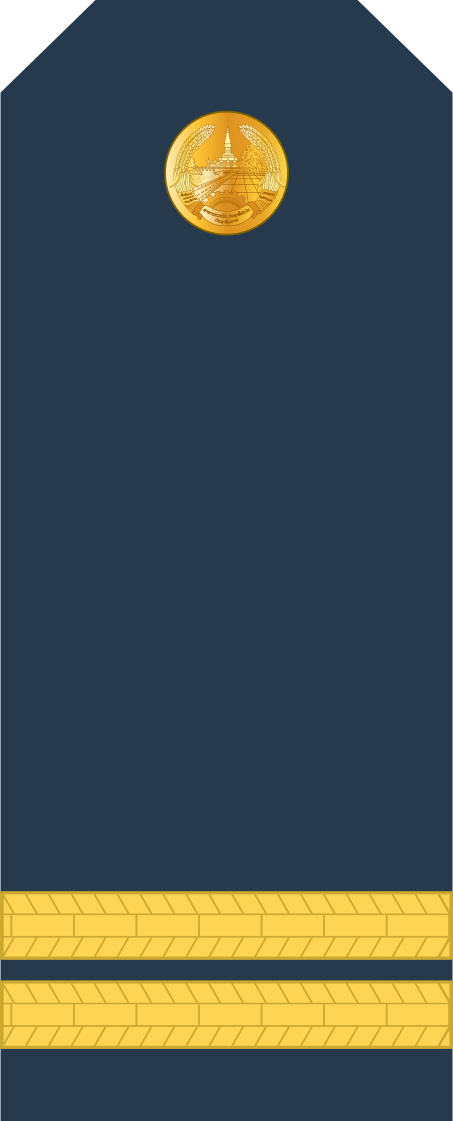
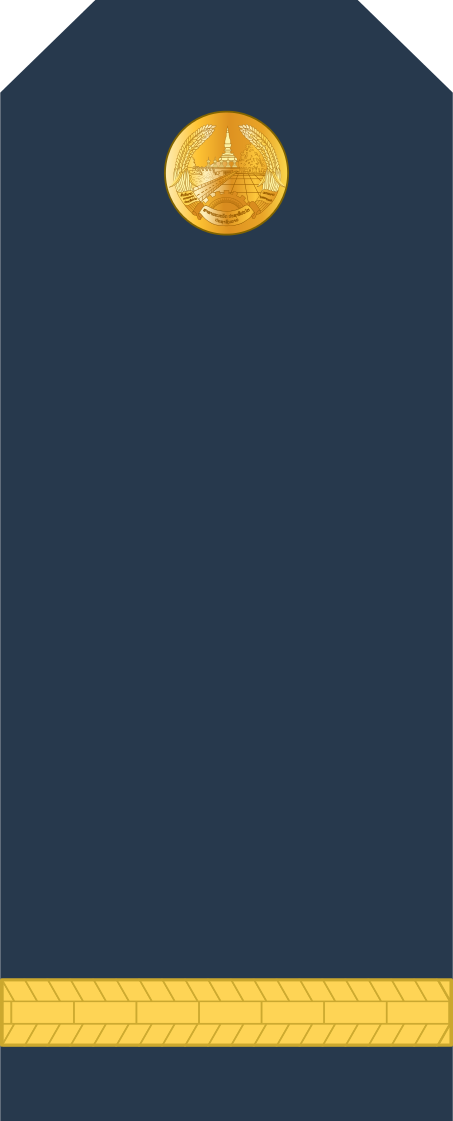
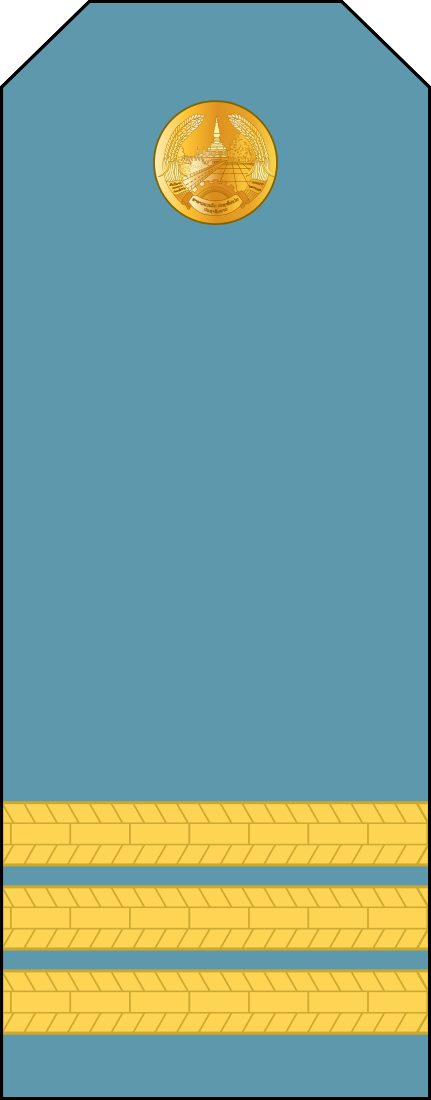
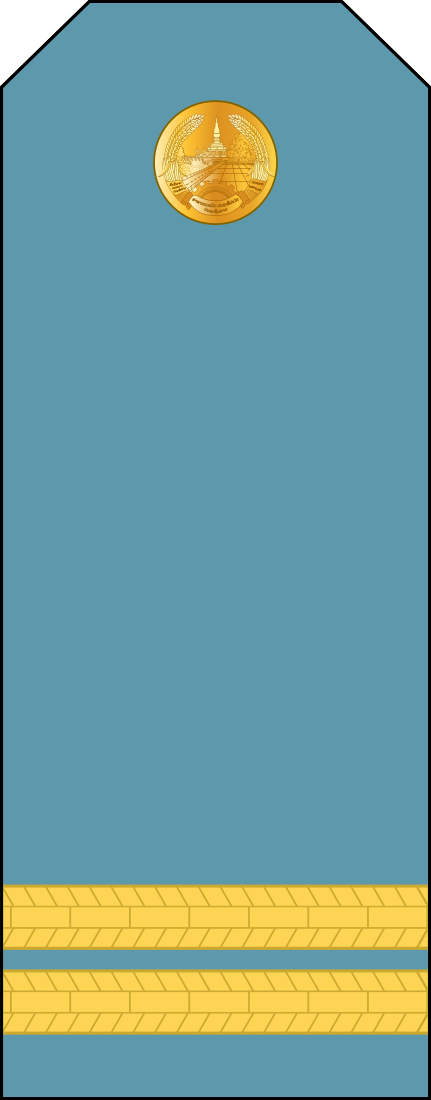
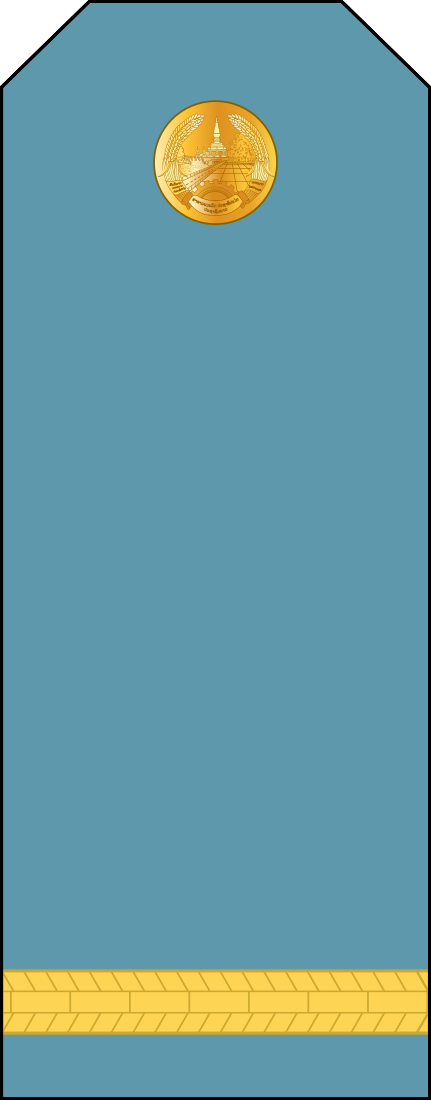
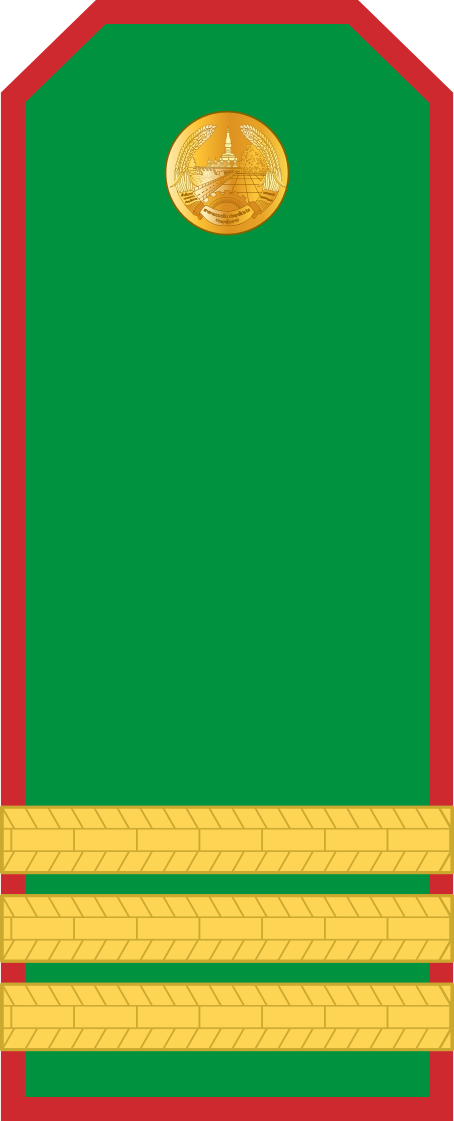
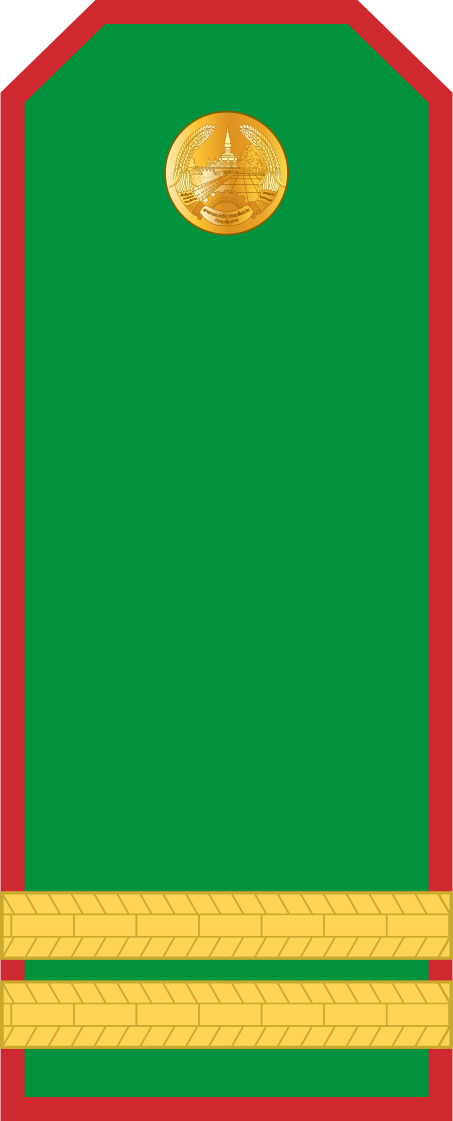
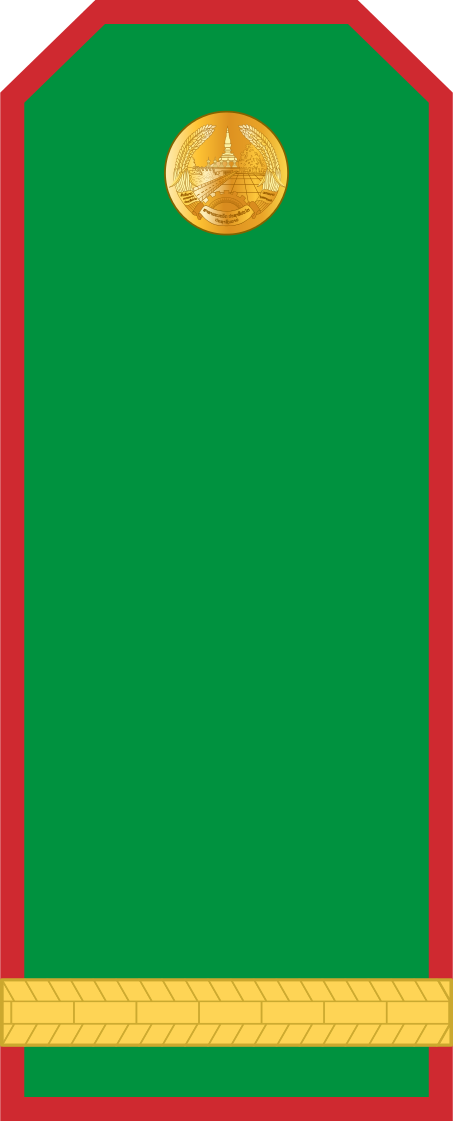
Rank group	Senior NCOs			Junior NCOs	Enlisted
Lao People's Army
Lao People's Army	ວາທີ Va thi	ສິບເອກ; Sib ek	ສິບໂທ; Sib oth	ສິບຕີ Sib ti	ຊັ້ນຫນຶ່ງ; Sannung	ຊັ້ນສອງ; Sansong
(Laos) Lao People's Navy
(Laos) Lao People's Navy	ວາທີ Va thi	ສິບເອກ; Sib ek	ສິບໂທ; Sib oth	ສິບຕີ Sib ti	ຊັ້ນຫນຶ່ງ; Sannung	ຊັ້ນສອງ; Sansong
Lao People's Liberation Air Force
Lao People's Liberation Air Force	ວາທີ Va thi	ສິບເອກ; Sib ek	ສິບໂທ; Sib oth	ສິບຕີ Sib ti	ຊັ້ນຫນຶ່ງ; Sannung	ຊັ້ນສອງ; Sansong
Laos Police
Laos Police	ວາທີ Va thi	ສິບເອກ; Sib ek	ສິບໂທ; Sib oth	ສິບຕີ Sib ti	ຊັ້ນຫນຶ່ງ; Sannung	ຊັ້ນສອງ; Sansong
Rank group	Senior NCOs			Junior NCOs	Enlisted

=== Pre-1983 enlisted ranks ===
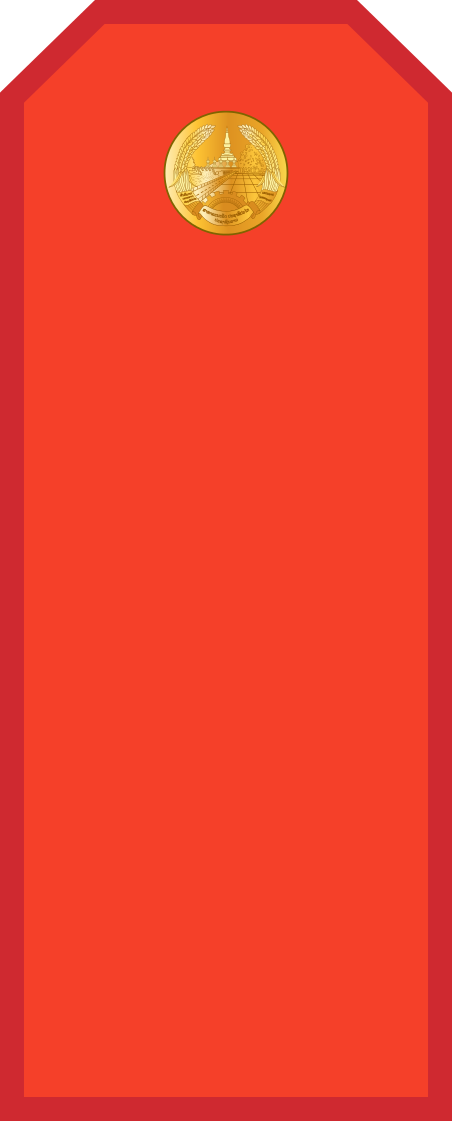
Laos People's Army Phonoek rank insignia 1975-1983

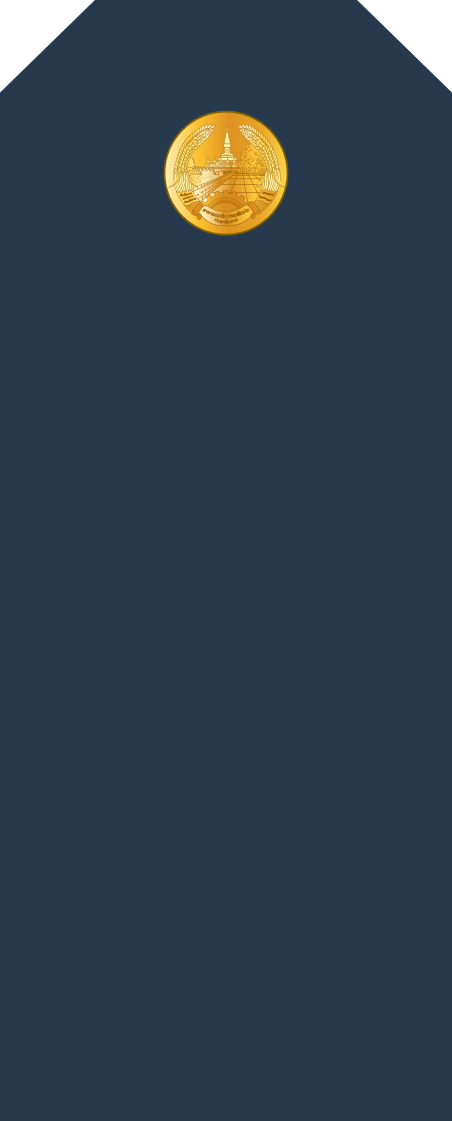
Laos People's Navy Private rank insignia 1975-1983

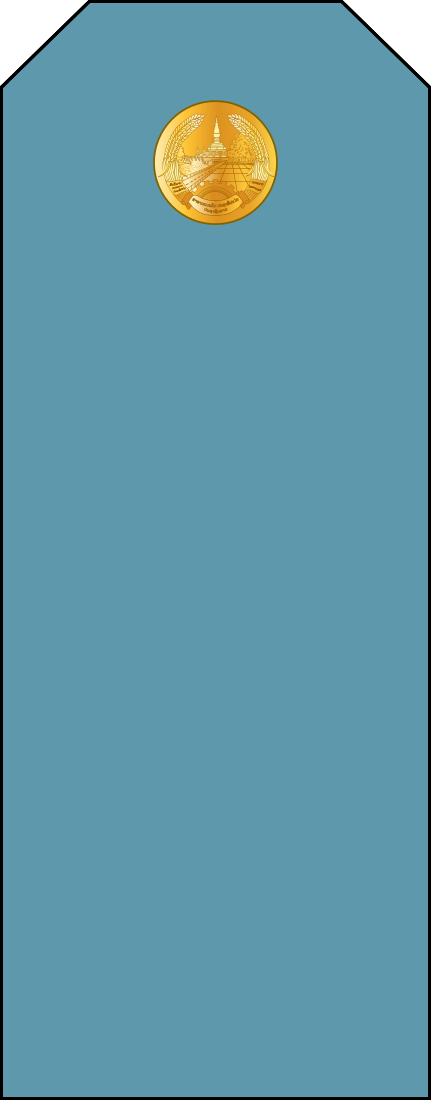
Laos People's Air Force Private rank insignia 1975-1983

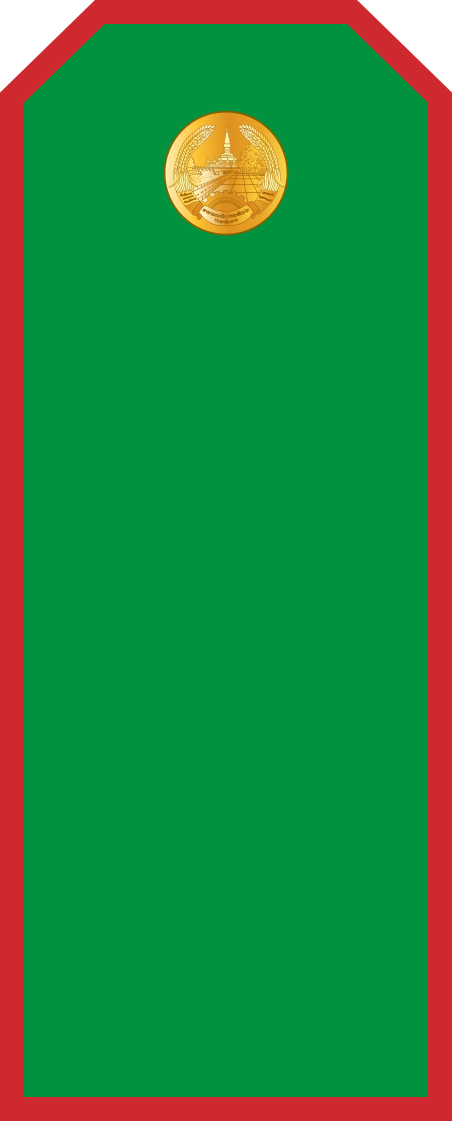
Laos People's Police Private rank insignia 1975-1983
