= Comparative air force officer ranks of Oceania =

Rank comparison chart of air forces of Oceanian states.

== Officers ==
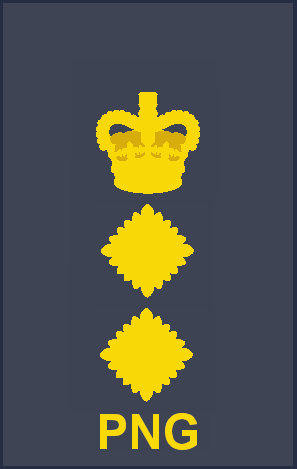
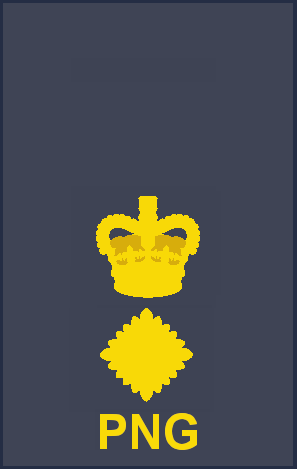
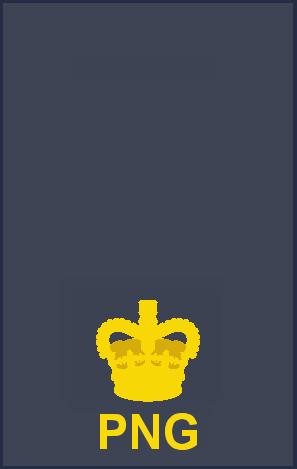
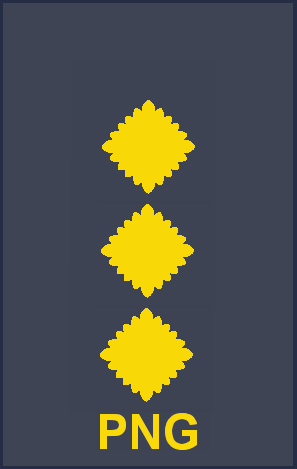
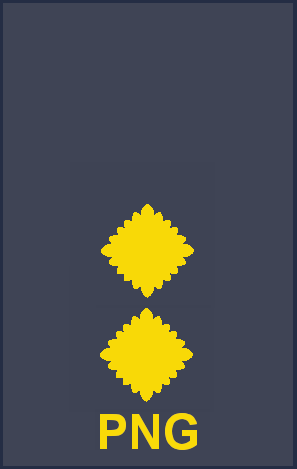
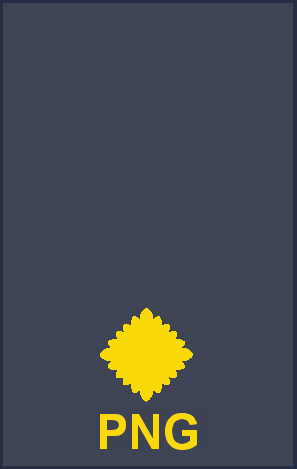
Rank group	General / flag officers					Senior officers			Junior officers
Royal Australian Air Force
Royal Australian Air Force	Marshal of the RAAF	Air chief marshal	Air marshal	Air vice-marshal	Air commodore	Group captain	Wing commander	Squadron leader	Flight lieutenant	Flying officer	Pilot officer
Federated States of Micronesia	No air force
Fiji	No air force
Kiribati	No air force
Marshall Islands	No air force
Nauru	No air force
Royal New Zealand Air Force
Royal New Zealand Air Force	Marshal of the RNZAF		Air marshal	Air vice-marshal	Air commodore	Group captain	Wing commander	Squadron leader	Flight lieutenant	Flying officer	Pilot officer
Palau	No air force
Papua New Guinea Air Element
Papua New Guinea Air Element						Colonel	Lieutenant colonel	Major	Captain	First lieutenant	Second lieutenant
Papua New Guinea Air Element						Kolonel	Leftenan kolonel	Meja	Kepten	Leftenan	Namba tu leftenan
Samoa	No air force
Solomon Islands	No air force
Tuvalu	No air force
Vanuatu	No air force
Rank group	General / flag officers					Senior officers			Junior officers

== See also ==
- Air force officer rank insignia
