= Rank insignia of the Carabinieri =

As the Arma dei Carabinieri is the fourth service of the Italian Armed Forces, the Ranks and rank insignia of the Carabinieri are designed according to the military rank structure of Italy. Carabinieri personnel belongs to four different career paths, the Officer career, the Inspector career, the Sovrintendente career, and the basic Carabinieri career.

== Officers ==
Candidates for the non-technical Officer career of the Carabinieri are recruited through the Military Academy of Modena. At the end of the two-year period, students graduate in "Legal Sciences" and are appointed Sottotenente. The cycle of studies continues for another three years at the Carabinieri Officer School, at the end of which the students obtain a master's degree in Law and, on a voluntary basis, also one in "Internal and external security sciences" (in agreement with the University of Rome Tor Vergata). Appointment to Tenente is after two years at the school.

Non-technical officers are also recruited by direct appointment as Sottotenente by Luogotenente, under 50 years old, with a Master's degree, and by all other ranks with at least five years service, under 40 years old, with a Bachelor's degree in law. The directly appointed Sottotenente are trained for two years at the Carabinieri Officer School, obtaining a master's degree in Law and promotion to Tenente.

NATO code	OF-10	OF-9	OF-8		OF-7	OF-6	OF-5	OF-4	OF-3	OF-2		OF-1
	Officers
	Generals						Senior officers			Junior officers
Italian Carabinieri
Italian Carabinieri		Comandante generale dell'arma dei carabinieri	Vicecomandante generale dell'arma dei carabinieri	Generale di corpo d'armata	Generale di divisione	Generale di brigata	Colonnello	Tenente colonnello	Maggiore	Primo capitano	Capitano	Tenente	Sottotenente

=== Special ranks ===
NATO Code	OF-8	OF-7		OF-6	OF-5			OF-4		OF-3		OF-2	OF-1
Special ranks
Special ranks	Generale di Corpo d'Armata former Vicecomandante generale dell'Arma dei Carabinieri	Generale di Divsione; Serving in higher rank	Generale di Divisione; Honorary rank	Generale di Brigata; Serving in higher rank	Colonnello; Serving in higher rank	Colonnello; Commanding officer	Colonnello; Honorary rank	Tenente colonnello Serving in higher rank	Tenente colonnello Commanding officer	Maggiore; Serving in higher rank	Maggiore; Commanding officer	Capitano; Serving in higher rank	Tenente; Commanding officer

NATO-code	Rank	Rank insignia
OF-D	Allievo ufficiale At the Military Academy of Modena (2 years)	

== Enlisted ==
Candidates for the Ispettori career are by law recruited to 70% by internal or civilian applicants with a high school diploma, to 20% from the Sovrintendente career, and to 10% from the basic Carabinieri career. The former candidates attend a three-year university-based training process at the School of Marshals and Brigadiers of the Carabinieri, graduating with a Bachelor's degree in "Legal Sciences of Security" at the University of Rome Tor Vergata, while the latter candidates are trained for six months at the School of Marshals and Brigadiers of the Carabinieri.

Candidates for the Sovrintendente career are by law recruited to 60% from the Appuntato scelto and to 40% from the lower ranks of the basic Carabinieri career. The former candidates are trained during one month, and the latter candidates during three months, at the School of Marshals and Brigadiers of the Carabinieri.

Candidates for the basic carabinieri career are by law recruited to 70% from serving soldiers with one or four year enlistments as temporary service volunteers, and to 30% from civilian life irrespective of previous military service. Initial enlistment is for a period of four years, after which permanent status is achieved. Training is one year at one of five Carabinieri schools.

Candidates for the basic carabinieri career are by law recruited to 70% from serving soldiers with one or four year enlistments as temporary service volunteers, and to 30% from civilian life irrespective of previous military service. Initial enlistment is for a period of four years, after which permanent status is achieved. Training is one year at one of five Carabinieri schools.

NATO code	OR-9				OR-8		OR-7		OR-6	OR-5	OR-4	OR-3	OR-2	OR-1
	Sub-officers										Volunteer ratings
	Ispettori						Sovrintendente				Appuntati e Carabinieri
Italian Carabinieri											Appuntato scelto q.s. / Appuntato scelto / Appuntato / Carabiniere scelto / Carabiniere
Italian Carabinieri	Primo luogotenente c.s. s.u.p.s	Luogotenente s.u.p.s.	Primo Maresciallo	Maresciallo Capo	Maresciallo Ordinario	Maresciallo	Brigadiere capo q.s.	Brigadiere capo	Brigadiere	Vicebrigadiere	Appuntato scelto q.s. / Appuntato scelto / Appuntato / Carabiniere scelto / Carabiniere

NATO-code	Rank	Rank insignia
n/a	Allievo maresciallo	
n/a	Allievo Sovrintendente	
n/a	Allievo carabinere During the first six months at the Carabinieri school (1 year)	

== See also ==
- Italian Army ranks
- Italian Navy ranks
- Italian Air Force ranks
- Italian Police Ranks
