= Comparative air force enlisted ranks of Oceania =

Rank comparison chart of air forces of Oceanian states.

== Enlisted ==
Rank group	Senior NCOs					Junior NCOs		Enlisted
Royal Australian Air Force
Royal Australian Air Force	Warrant Officer of the Air Force	Warrant officer	Flight sergeant		Sergeant	Corporal		Leading aircraftman/ aircraftwoman	Aircraftman/ aircraftwoman
Federated States of Micronesia	No air force
Fiji	No air force
Kiribati	No air force
Marshall Islands	No air force
Nauru	No air force
Royal New Zealand Air Force
Royal New Zealand Air Force	Warrant Officer			Flight Sergeant	Sergeant	Corporal		Leading Aircraftman	Aircraftman
Palau	No air force
Papua New Guinea Air Element								No insignia
Papua New Guinea Air Element	Warrant Officer Class 1		Warrant Officer Class 2	Staff Sergeant	Sergeant	Corporal	Lance Corporal	Private
Samoa	No air force
Solomon Islands	No air force
Tuvalu	No air force
Vanuatu	No air force
Rank group	Senior NCOs					Junior NCOs		Enlisted

== See also ==
- Air force other ranks rank insignia
