= Comparative army enlisted ranks of Oceania =

Rank comparison chart of non-commissioned officers (NCOs) and enlisted personnel for all armies and land forces of Oceanian states.

== Enlisted ==
Rank group	Senior NCOs					Junior NCOs		Enlisted
Australian Army								No insignia
Australian Army	Regimental sergeant major of the army	Warrant officer class 1	Warrant officer class 2		Sergeant	Corporal	Lance corporal	Private (or equivalent)
Federated States of Micronesia	No army
Fiji Infantry Regiment								No insignia
Fiji Infantry Regiment	Warrant officer class 1		Warrant officer class 2	Staff sergeant	Sergeant	Corporal	Lance corporal	Private (or equivalent)
Kiribati	No army
Marshall Islands	No army
Nauru	No army
New Zealand Army									No insignia
New Zealand Army	Warrant officer class 1		Warrant officer class 2	Staff sergeant	Sergeant	Corporal	Lance corporal		Private (or equivalent)
Palau	No army
Papua New Guinea Land Element								No insignia
Papua New Guinea Land Element	Warrant officer class 1 ?		Warrant officer class 2 ?	Staff sergeant Plag Sajen	Sergeant; Sajen	Corporal; Kopul	Lance corporal Lans Kopul	Private; Praivet
Samoa	No army
Solomon Islands	No army
Tongan Land Component								No insignia
Tongan Land Component	Warrant officer class 1		Warrant officer class 2	Staff sergeant	Sergeant	Corporal	Lance corporal	Private (or equivalent)
Tongan Land Component	'Ofisa Fakamafai Kalasi 1		'Ofisa Fakamafai Kalasi 2	Sitafu satini	Satini	Kopila	Lani kopila	Palaiveti
Tuvalu	No army
Vanuatu Mobile Forces
Vanuatu Mobile Forces	Warrant Officer; Class 1		Warrant Officer; Class 2	Staff Sergeant; Staf Sajen	Sergeant; Sajen	Corporal; Kofol	Lance Corporal	Constable; Polis	Recruit; Rikrut
Rank group	Senior NCOs					Junior NCOs		Enlisted

== See also ==
- Comparative army enlisted ranks of the Americas
- Ranks and insignia of NATO armies enlisted
