= Comparative navy officer ranks of Oceania =

Rank comparison chart of officers for navies of Oceanian states.

== Officers ==
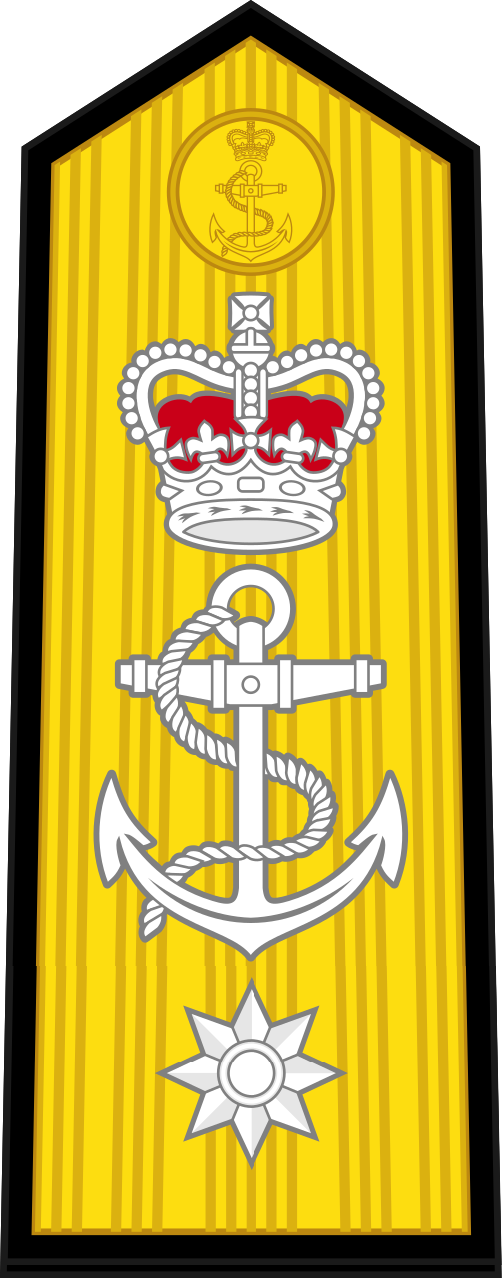
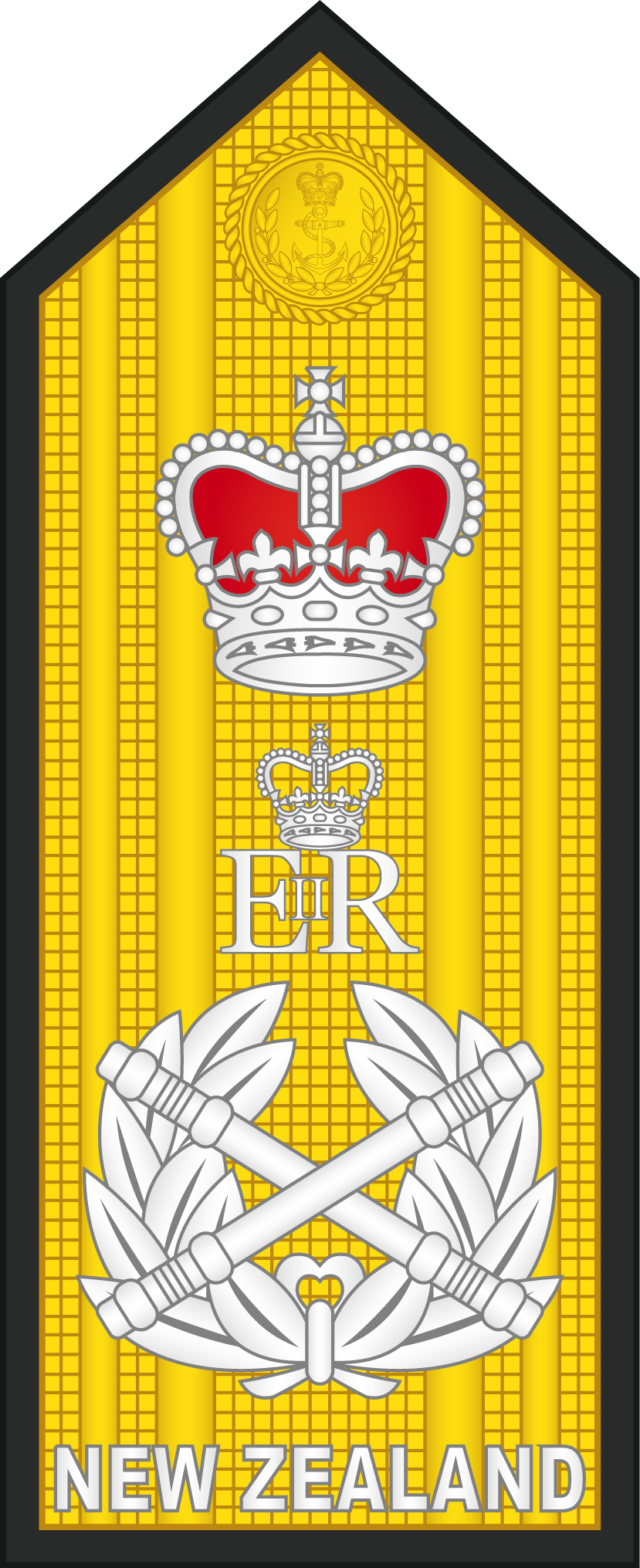
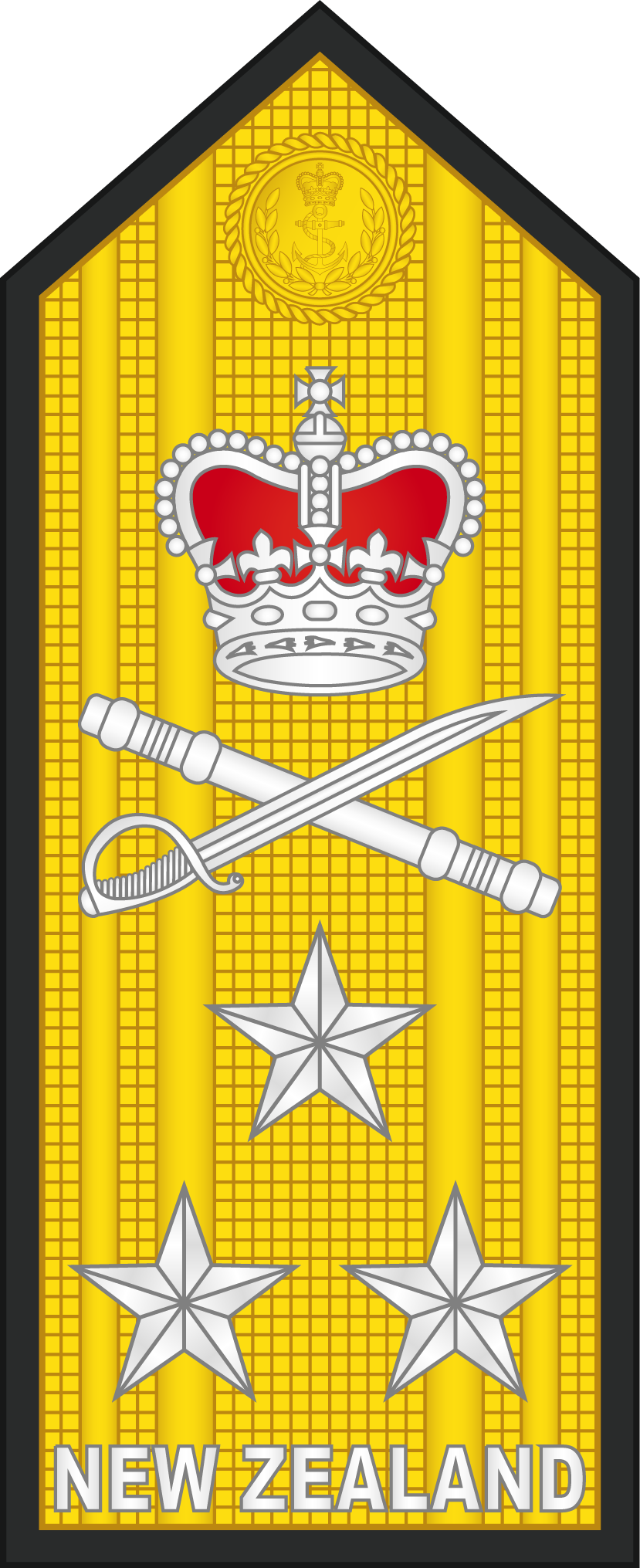
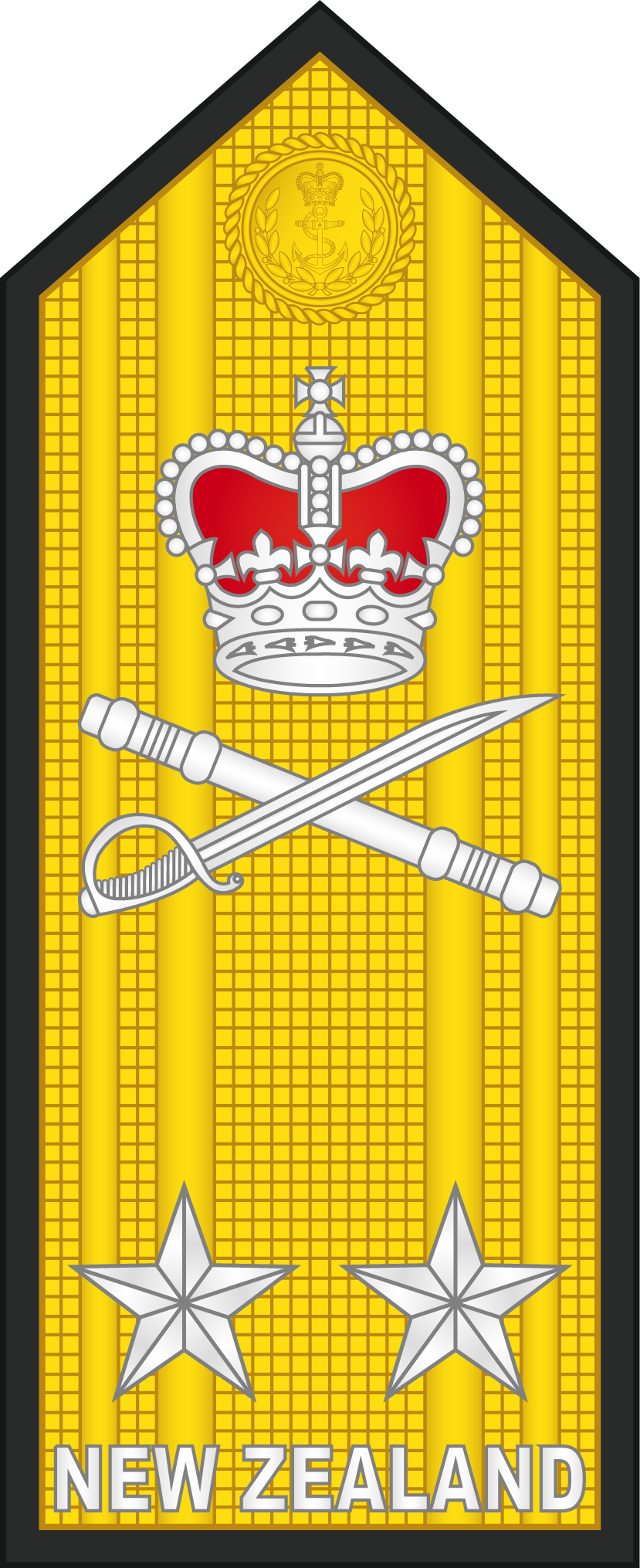
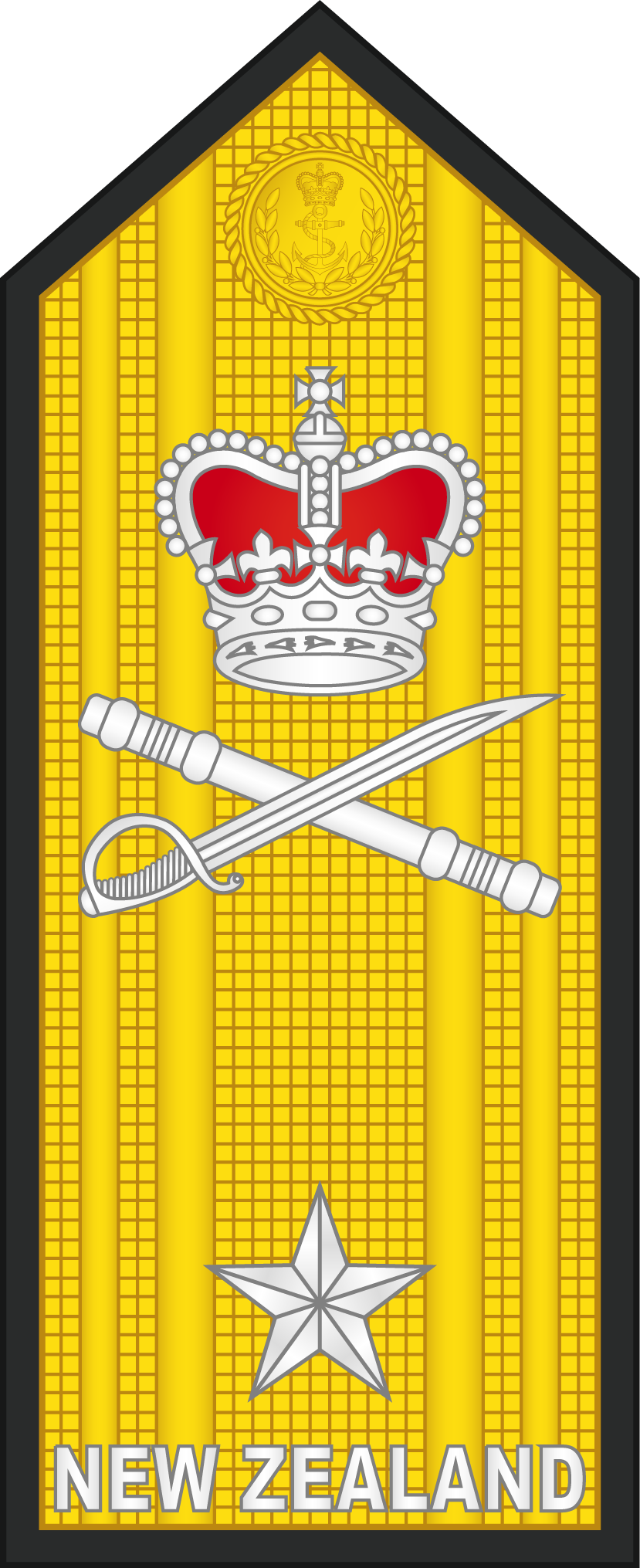
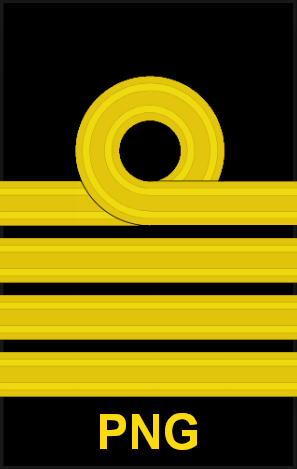
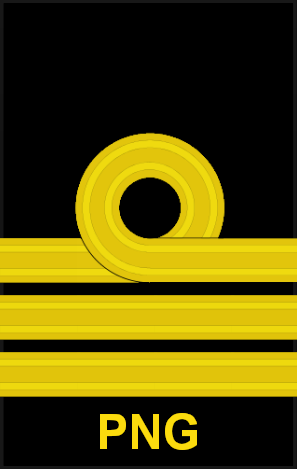
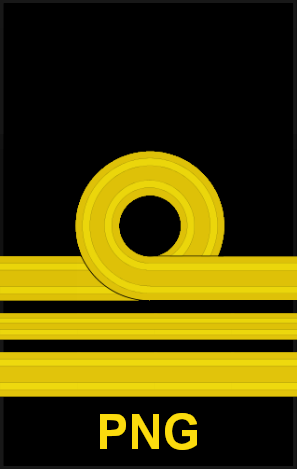
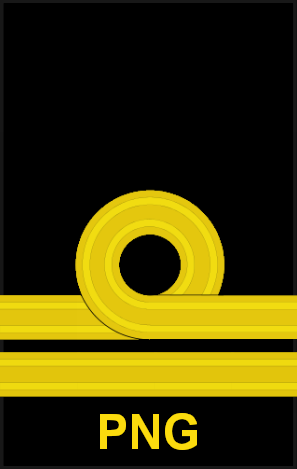
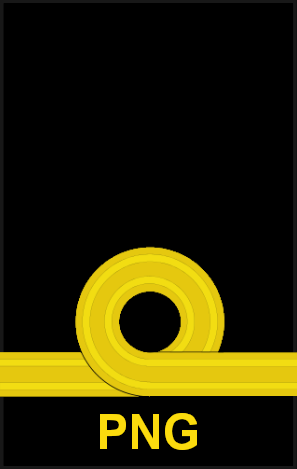
Rank group	General / flag officers					Senior officers			Junior officers
Royal Australian Navy
Royal Australian Navy	Admiral of the fleet	Admiral	Vice admiral	Rear admiral	Commodore	Captain	Commander	Lieutenant commander	Lieutenant	Sub lieutenant	Acting sub lieutenant
Federated States of Micronesia	No navy
Republic of Fiji Navy
Republic of Fiji Navy				Rear admiral	Commodore	Captain	Commander	Lieutenant commander	Lieutenant	Sub-Lieutenant	Ensign
Kiribati	No navy
Marshall Islands	No navy
Nauru	No navy
Royal New Zealand Navy
Royal New Zealand Navy	Admiral of the fleet		Vice admiral	Rear admiral	Commodore	Captain	Commander	Lieutenant commander	Lieutenant	Sub lieutenant	Ensign
Palau	No navy
Papua New Guinea Maritime Element
Papua New Guinea Maritime Element				Rear Admiral	Commodore	Captain	Commander	Lieutenant; Commander	Lieutenant	Sub; Lieutenant
Samoa	No navy
Solomon Islands	No navy
Tongan Navy
Tongan Navy		Commander-in-chief			Commodore	Captain	Commander	Lieutenant commander	Lieutenant	Sub lieutenant	Midshipman
Tuvalu	No navy
Vanuatu Maritime Wing
Vanuatu Maritime Wing							Commander; Komanda	Lieutenant commander Lietnen Komanda	Lieutenant; Lietnen	Sub lieutenant Sab-Lietnen
Rank group	General / flag officers					Senior officers			Junior officers

== See also ==
- Comparative navy officer ranks of the Americas
- Ranks and insignia of NATO navies officers
