= Italian Air Force ranks =

The Ranks of the Italian Air Force are the military rank insignia used by the Italian Air Force, usually worn on jackets and mantels sleeves.

== Rank structure ==
=== Officers ===
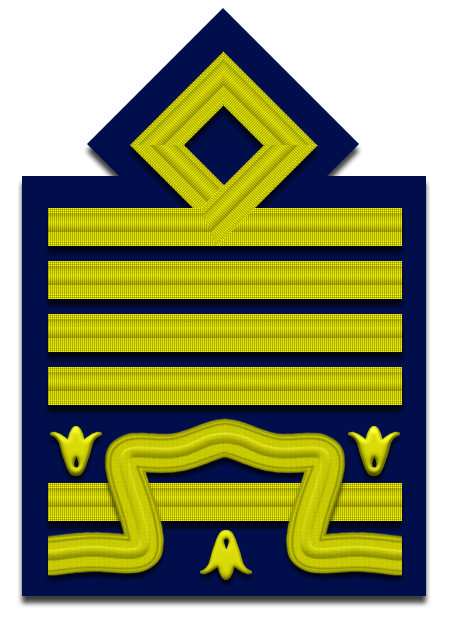
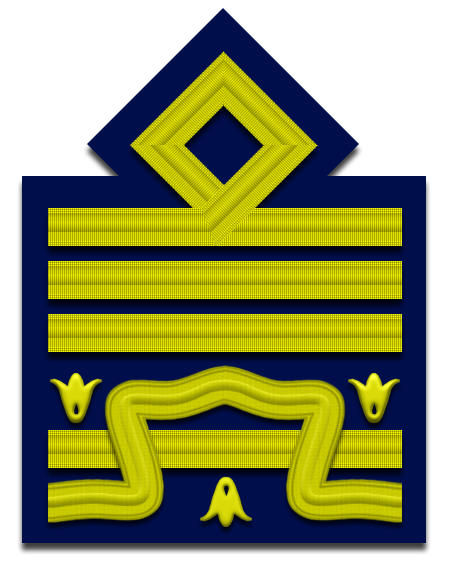
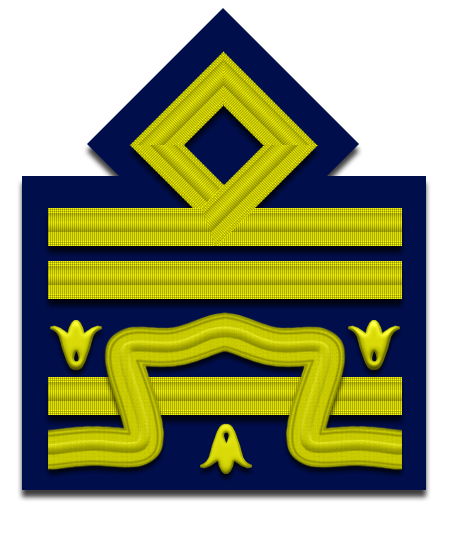
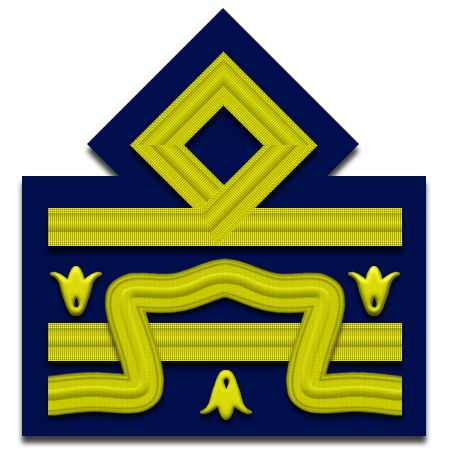
NATO code	OF-10	OF-9	OF-8	OF-7	OF-6	OF-5	OF-4	OF-3	OF-2		OF-1
Role	Generals					Senior officers			Junior officers
Italian Air Force
Italian Air Force		Generale	Generale di squadra aerea	Generale di divisione aerea	Generale di brigata aerea	Colonnello	Tenente colonnello	Maggiore	Primo capitano	Capitano	Tenente	Sottotenente
English rank name translation		General	Air squadron general	Air divisional general	Air brigade general	Colonel	Lieutenant colonel	Major	Captain	Lieutenant		Second lieutenant

Notes:
^{1} The rank of "generale" (general) is assigned to the only air force officer promoted as marshal of the defense staff.

^{2} The rank of "generale di squadra aerea con incarichi speciali" (air squadron general with special assignments) is assigned to the air force officer promoted as marshal of the air force staff and/or as secretary of defense.

=== Non-commissioned officers and ratings ===
NATO code	OR-9			OR-8	OR-7		OR-6	OR-5	OR-4	OR-3	OR-2	OR-1
Role	Marshals				Sergeants				Permanent service volunteers		Temporary service volunteers
Italian Air Force				Maresciallo di prima classe / Maresciallo di seconda classe / Maresciallo di terza classe					Graduato aiutante / Primo graduato / Primo aviere capo / Primo aviere scelto / Aviere capo			No insignia
Italian Air Force	Primo luogotenente	Luogotenente	Primo maresciallo	Maresciallo di prima classe / Maresciallo di seconda classe / Maresciallo di terza classe	Sergente maggiore aiutante	Sergente maggiore capo	Sergente maggiore	Sergente	Graduato aiutante / Primo graduato / Primo aviere capo / Primo aviere scelto / Aviere capo	Primo aviere	Aviere scelto	Aviere
English rank name translation	First sub-lieutenant	Sub-lieutenant	First marshal	Marshal 1st class / Marshal 2nd class / Marshal 3rd class	Sergeant major adjutant	Chief sergeant major	Sergeant major	Sergeant	Graduate adjutant / First graduate / First chief airman / First chosen airman / Chief airman	Airman first class	Chosen airman	Airman

== History ==
=== Enlisted ranks introduced in 2018 ===
Other rank insignia
NATO code	OR-9	OR-7	OR-4
Shoulder board
Italian	Primo luogotenente q.s. (Note: q.s. - (qualifica speciale - special rank))	Sergente maggiore capo q.s.	Primo aviere capo scelto q.s.
English	First sub-lieutenant (special class)	Chief sergeant major (special class)	1st senior chief airman (special class)

=== Enlisted name changes in 2022 ===
On 5 August 2022 the qualifica speciale and Primo aviere capo scelto were renamed.

NATO code	OR-9	OR-7	OR-4
Insignia
(2018–2022)	Primo luogotenente q.s.	Sergente maggiore capo q.s.	Primo aviere capo scelto q.s.	Primo aviere capo scelto
(2022–Present)	Primo luogotenente	Sergente maggiore aiutante	Gradutato aiutante	Primo graduato

== See also ==
- Italian Army ranks
- Italian Navy ranks
- Military ranks of the Kingdom of Italy
- Military ranks of the Italian Social Republic

== Bibliography ==
- "Decreto Legislativo 15 marzo 2010, n. 66: Codice dell'ordinamento militare" (PDF). difesa.it (in Italian). 15 March 2010.
