= Comparative air force enlisted ranks of Asia =

Rank comparison chart of air forces of Asian states.

== Enlisted ==
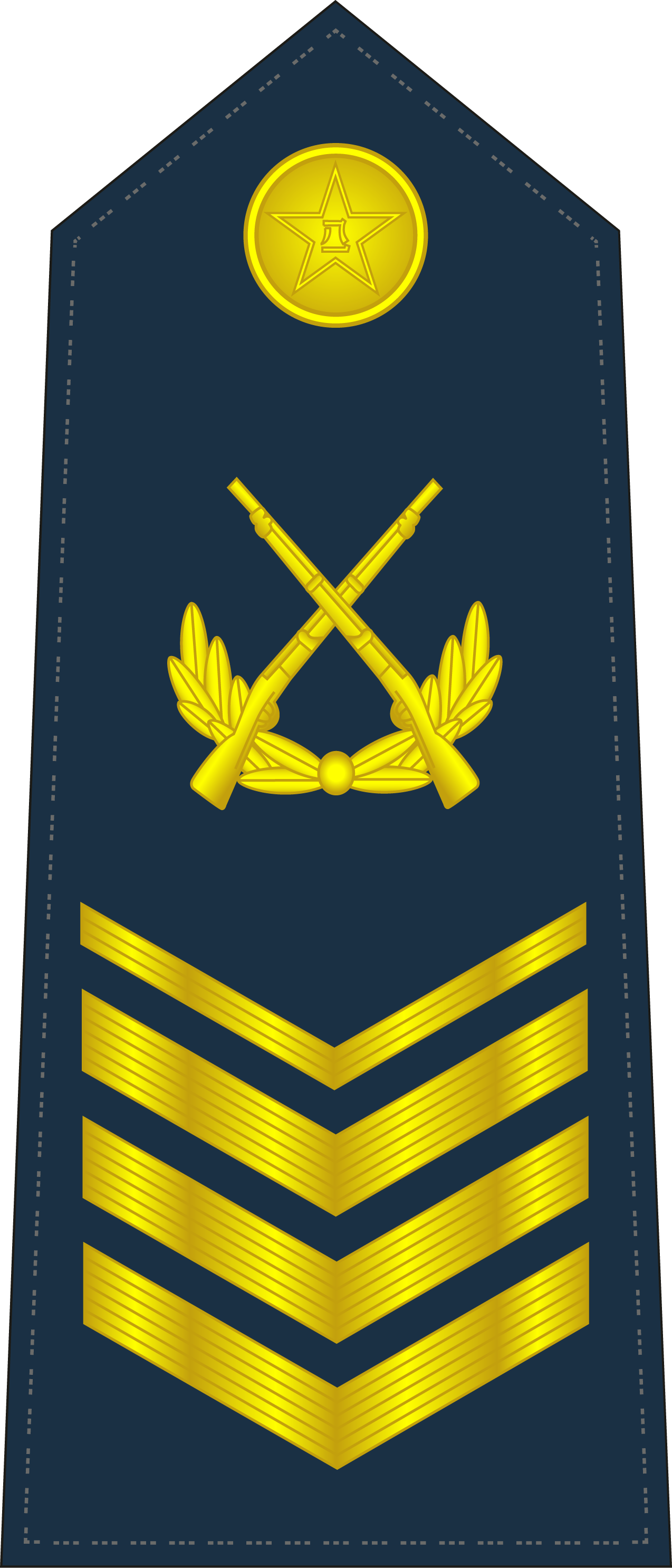
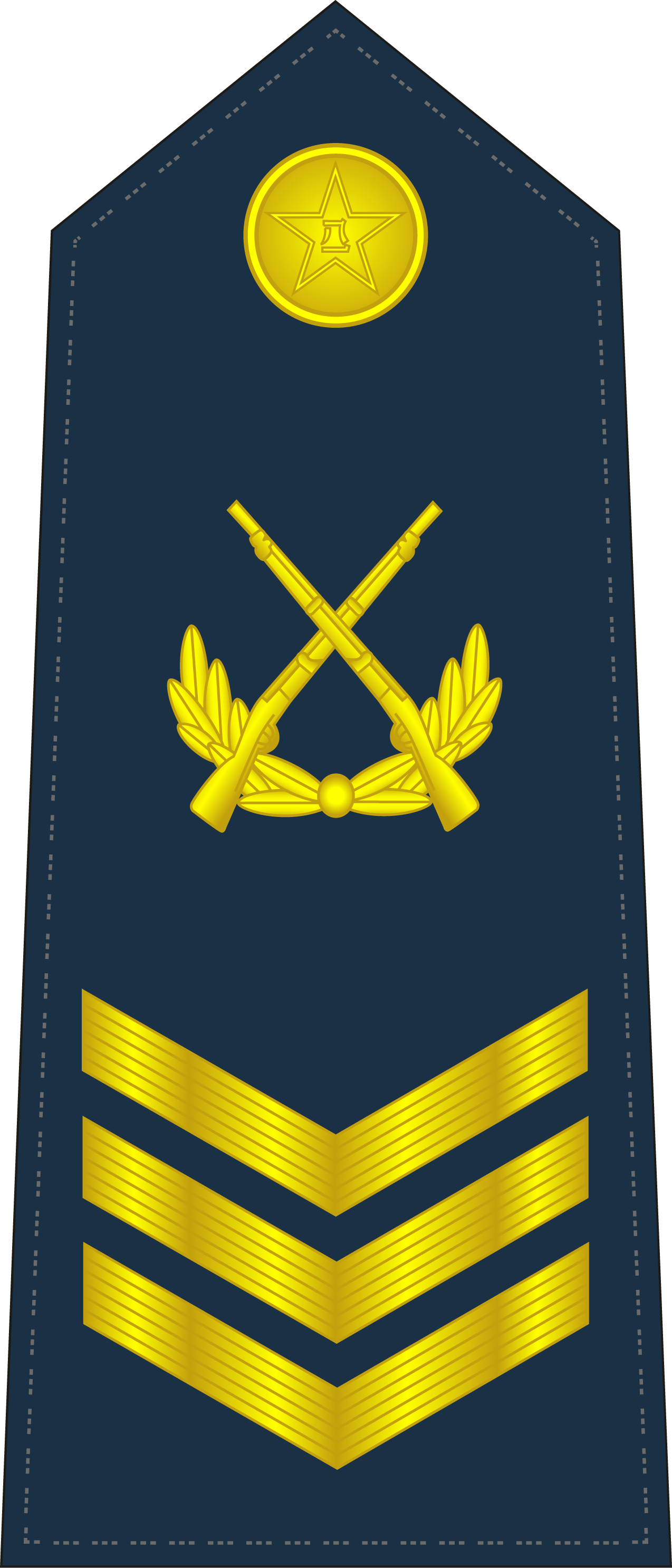
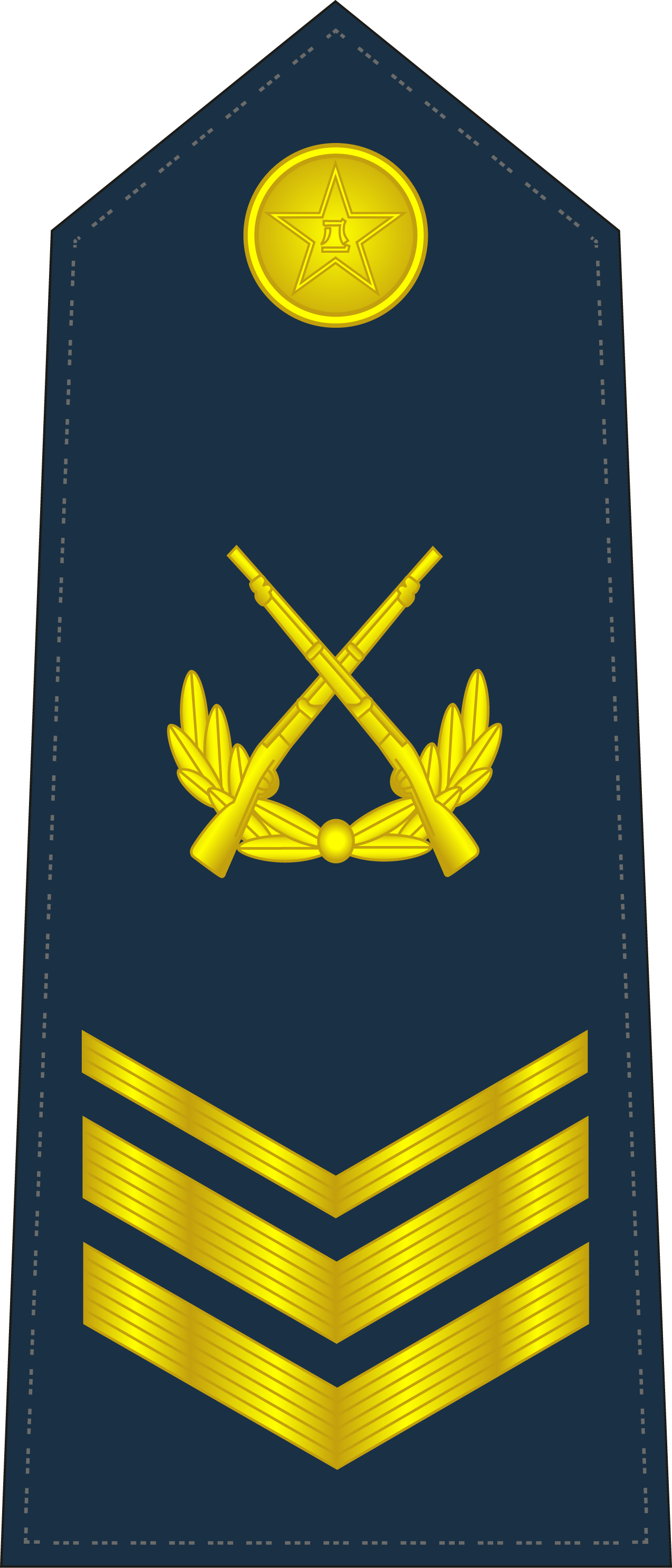
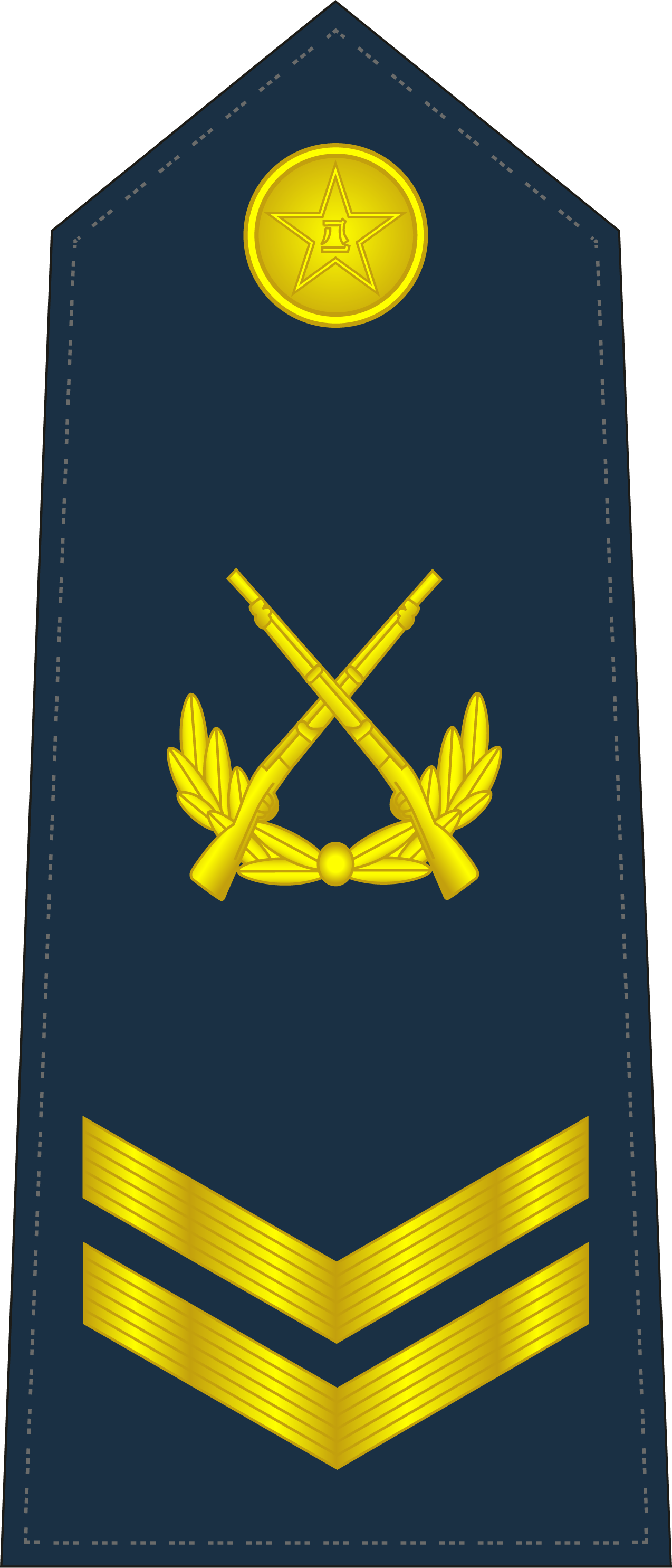
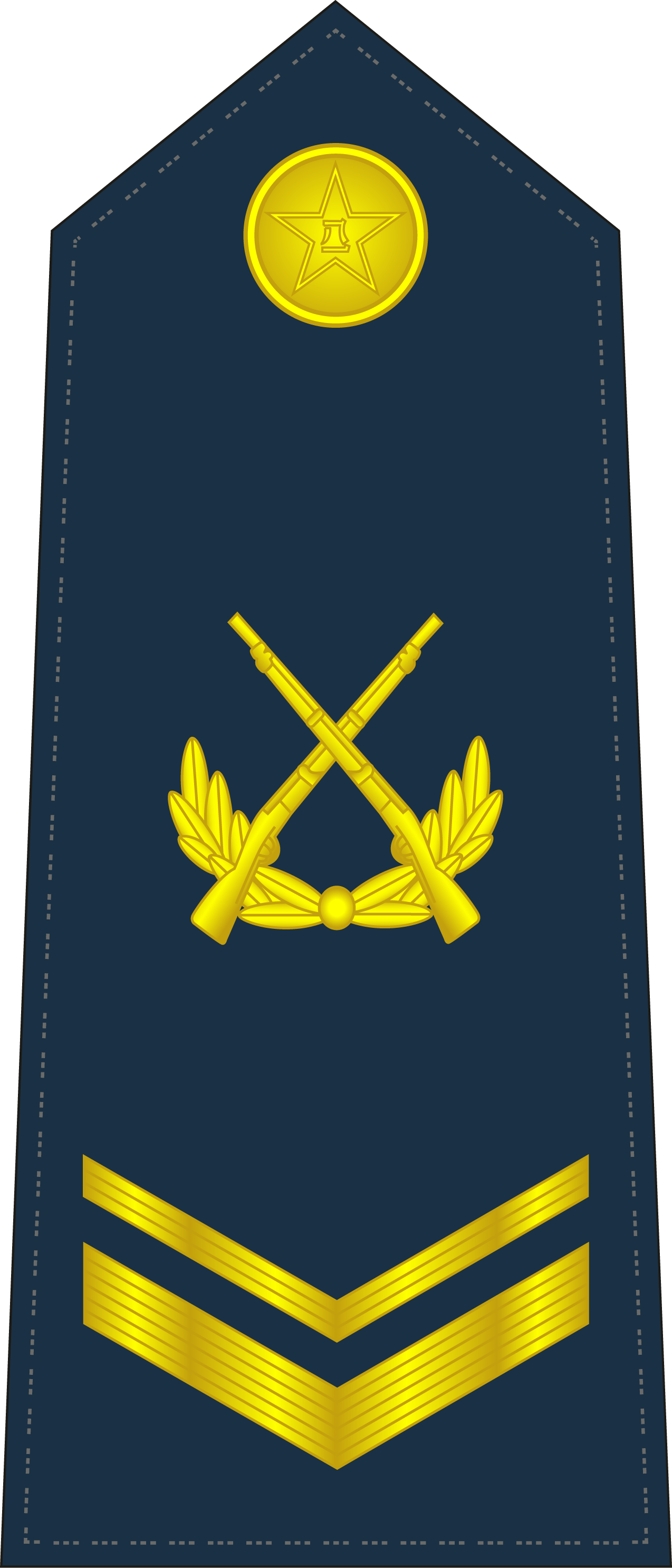
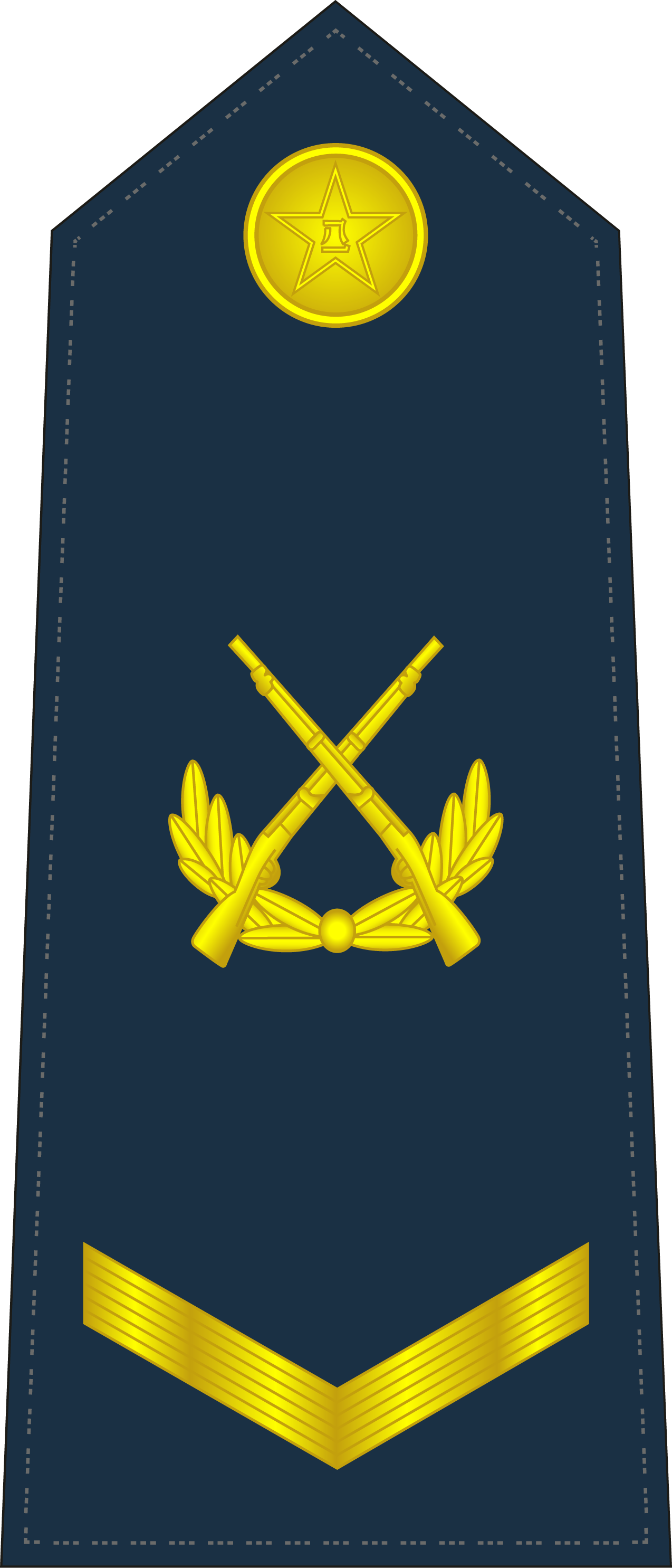
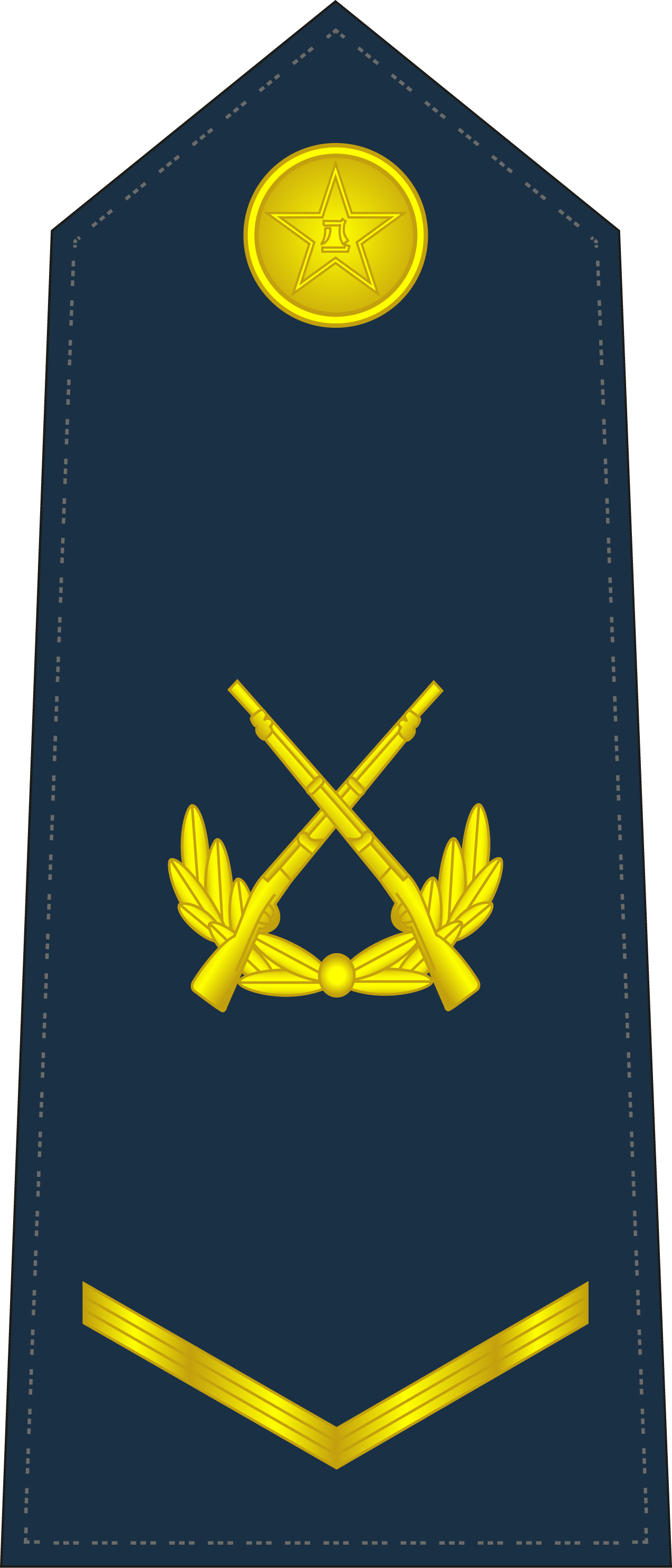
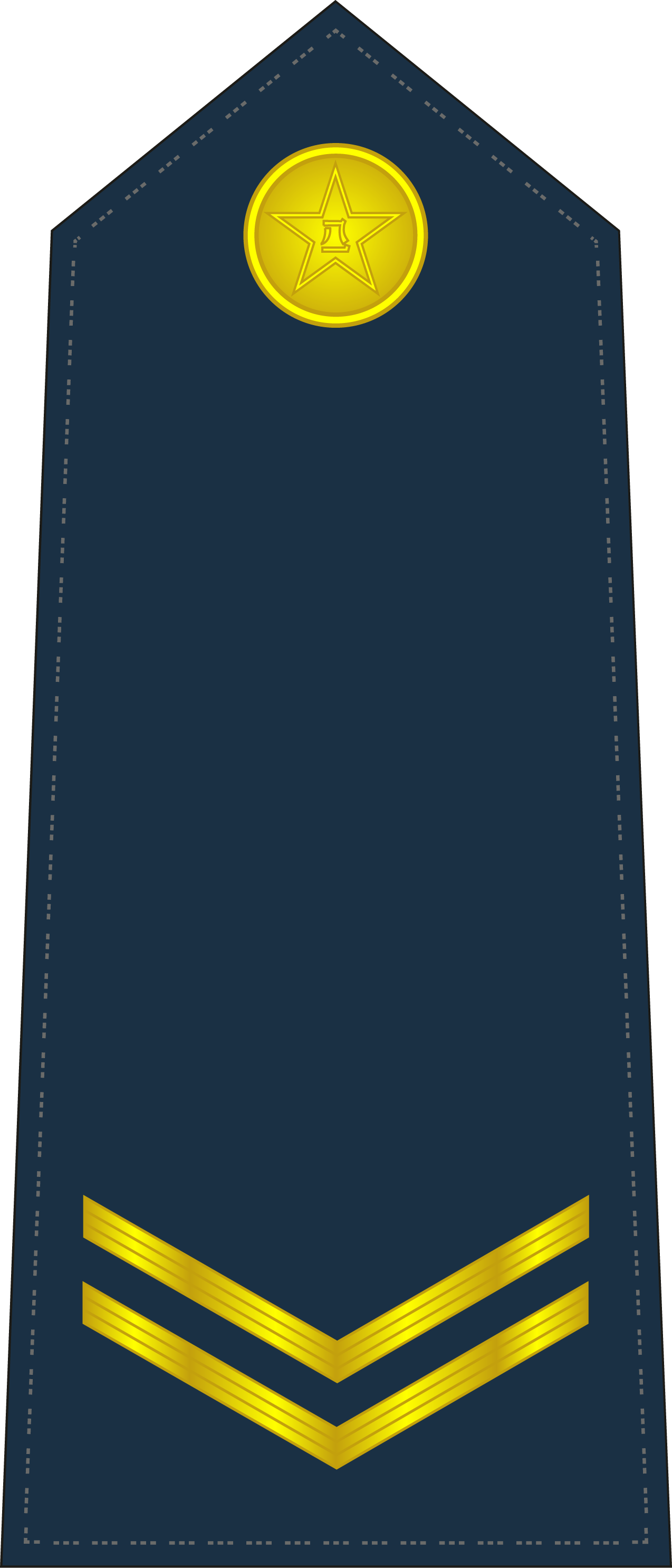
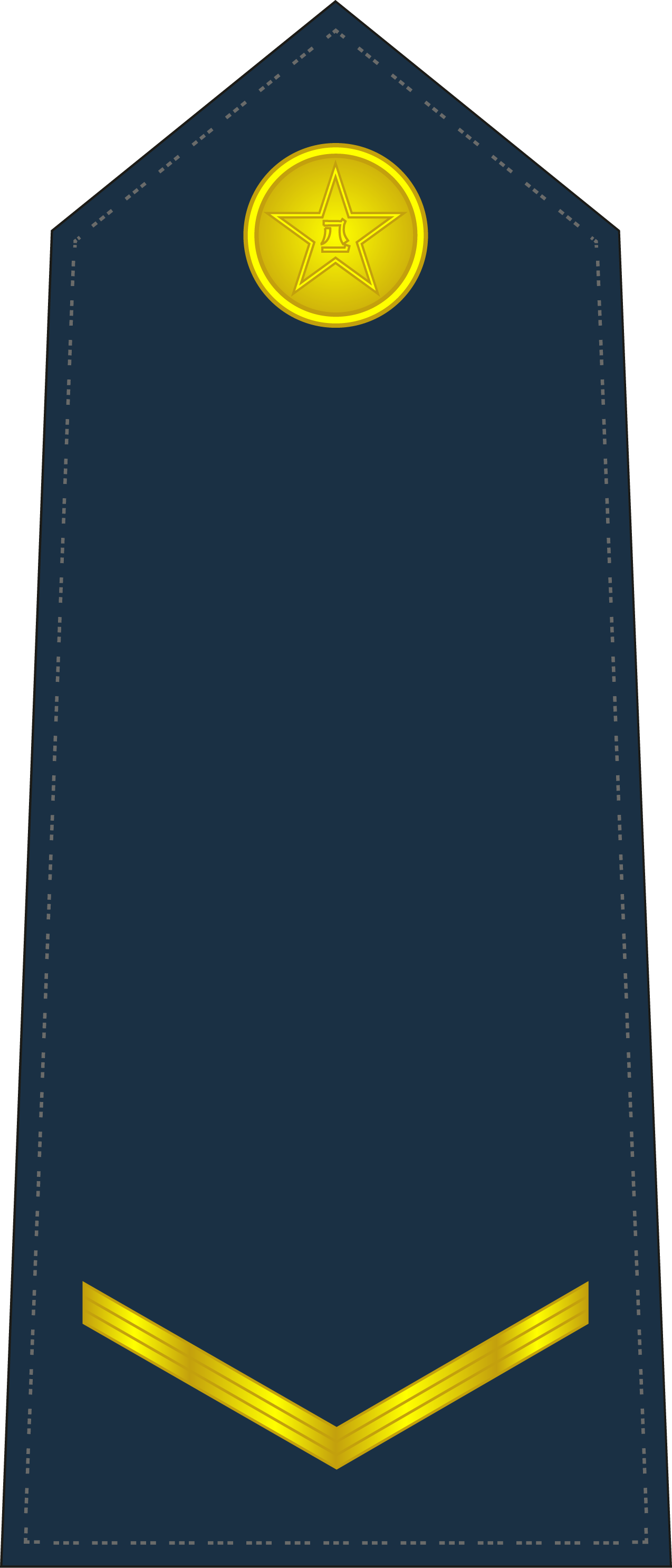
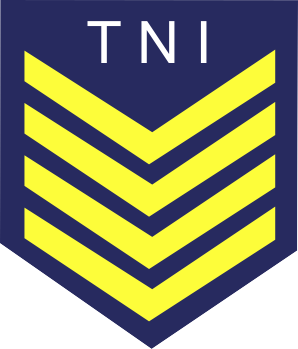
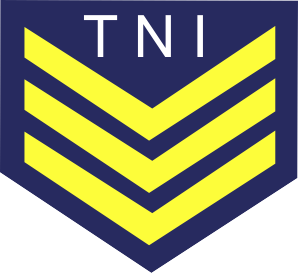
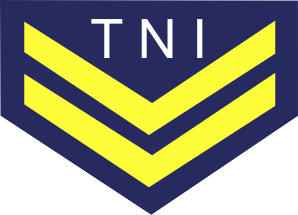
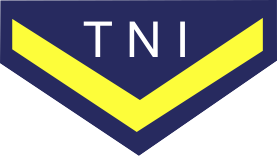
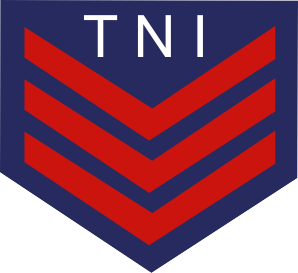
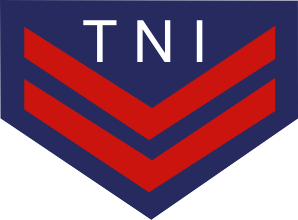
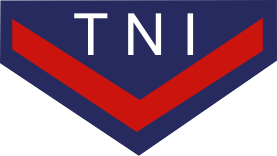
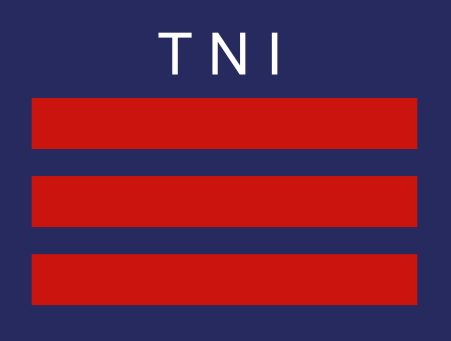
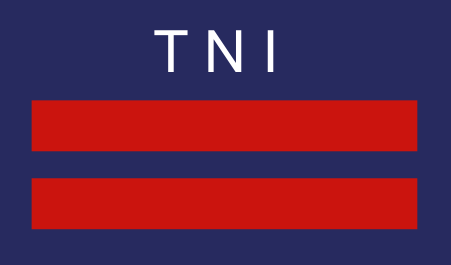
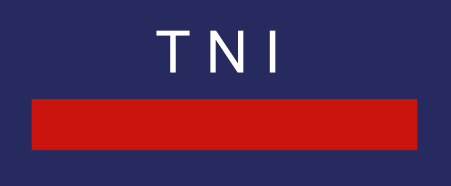
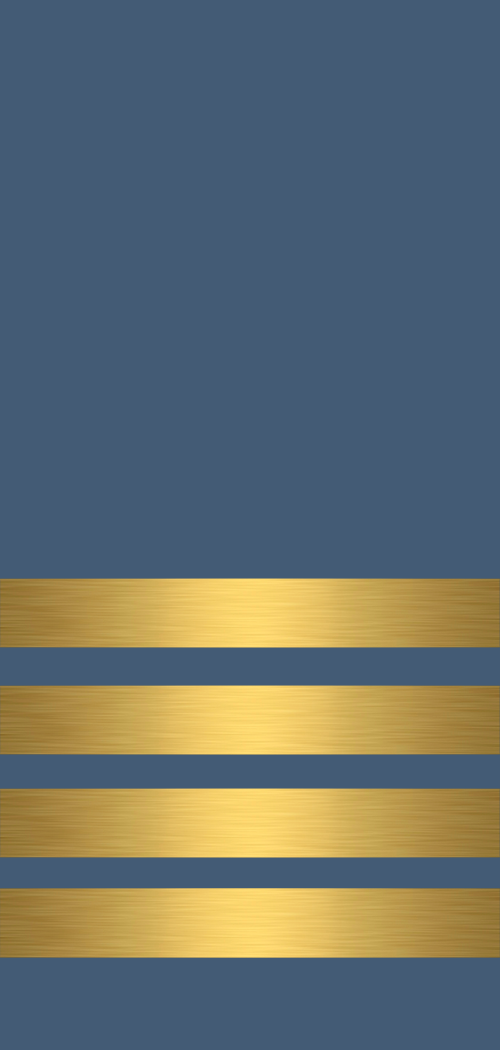
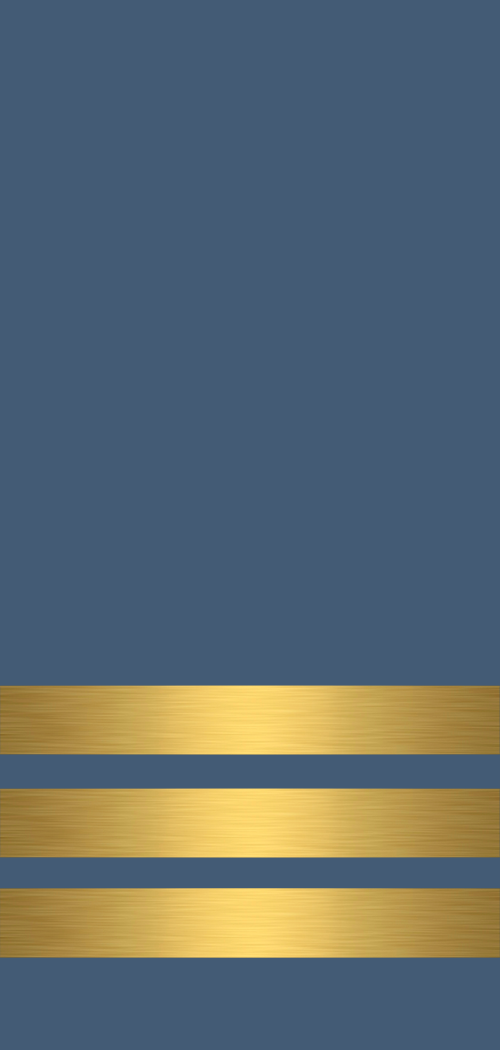
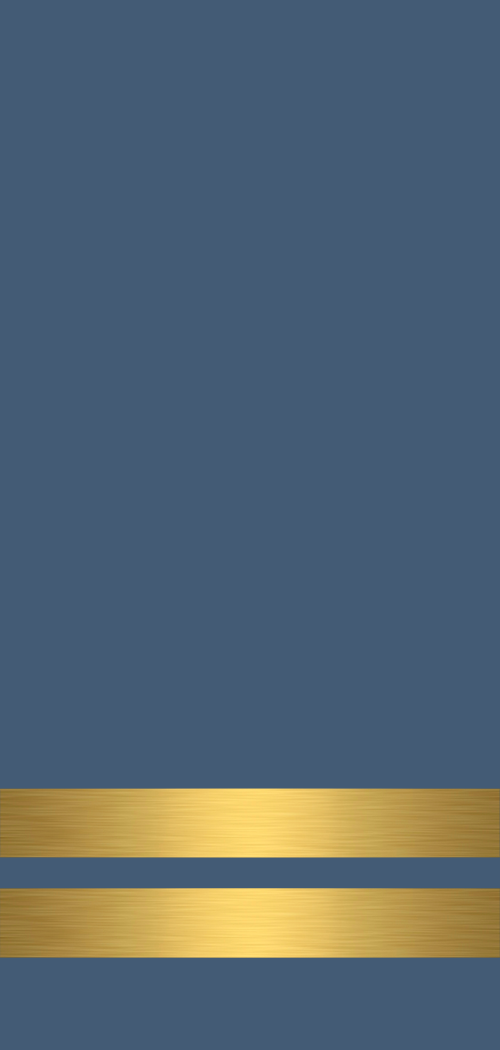
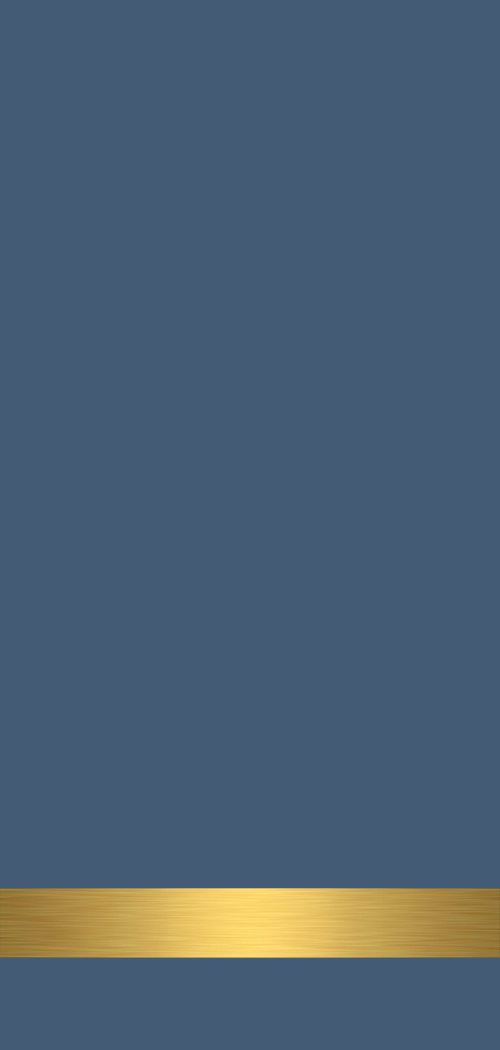
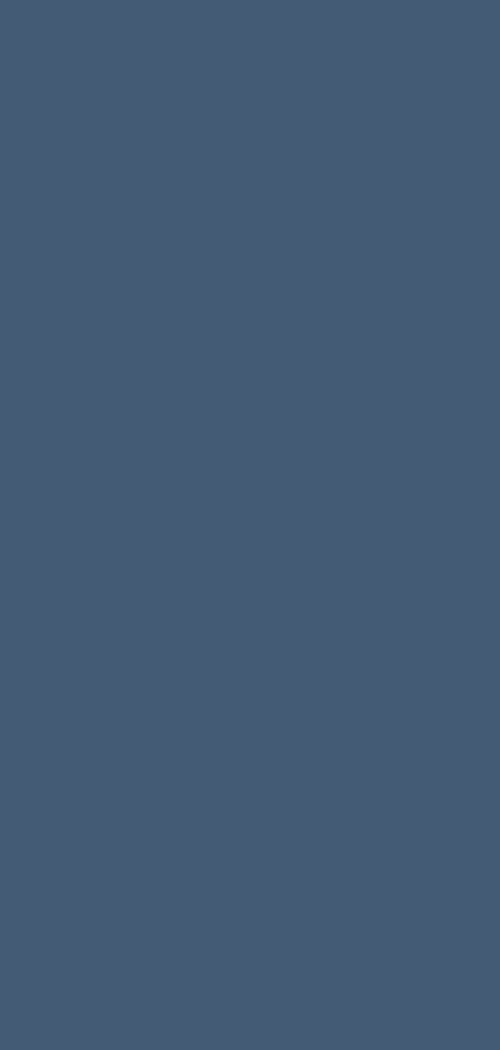
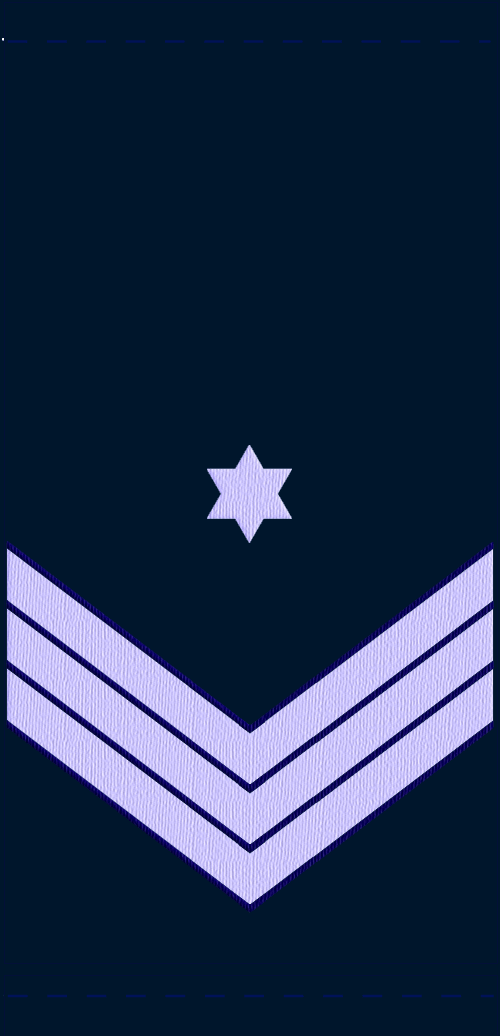
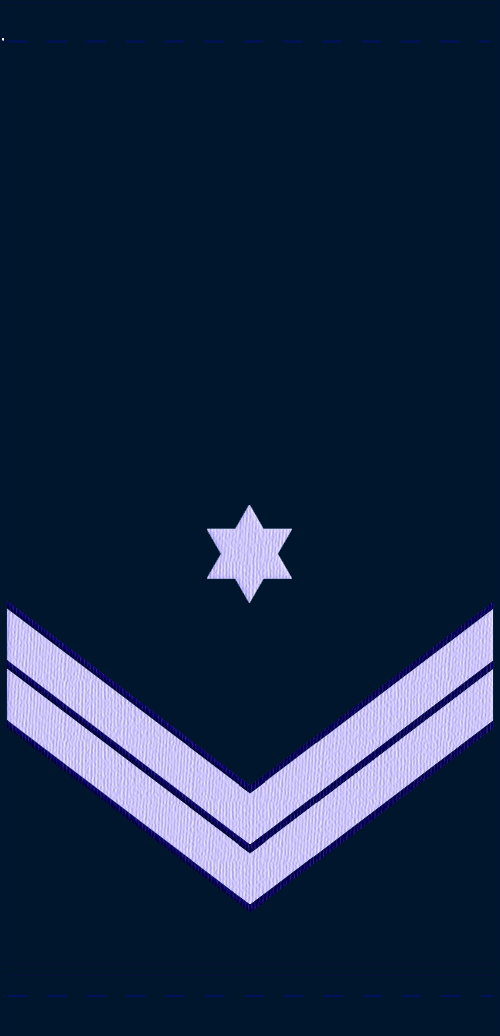
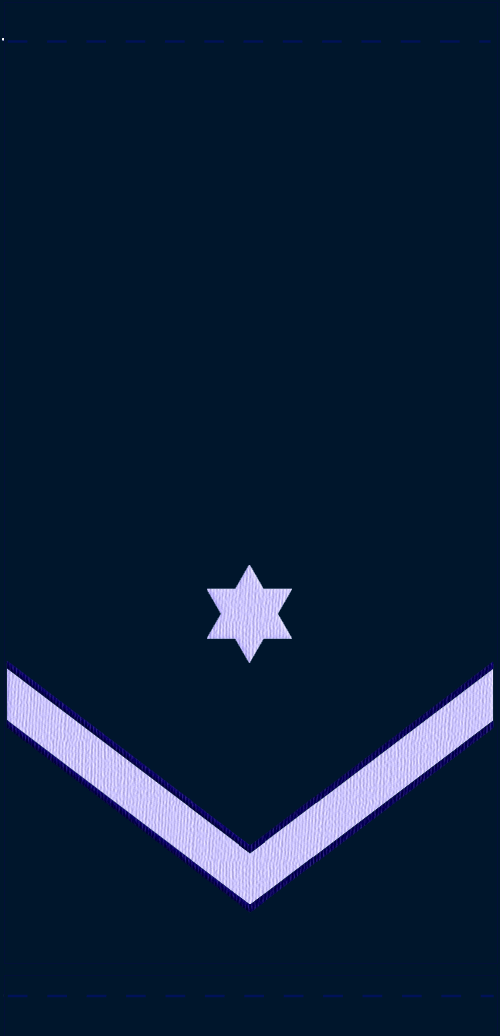
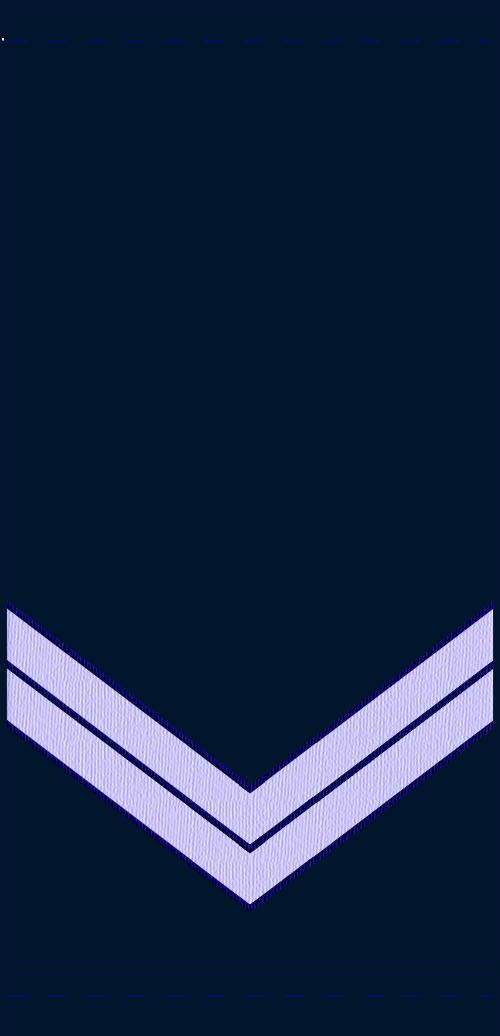
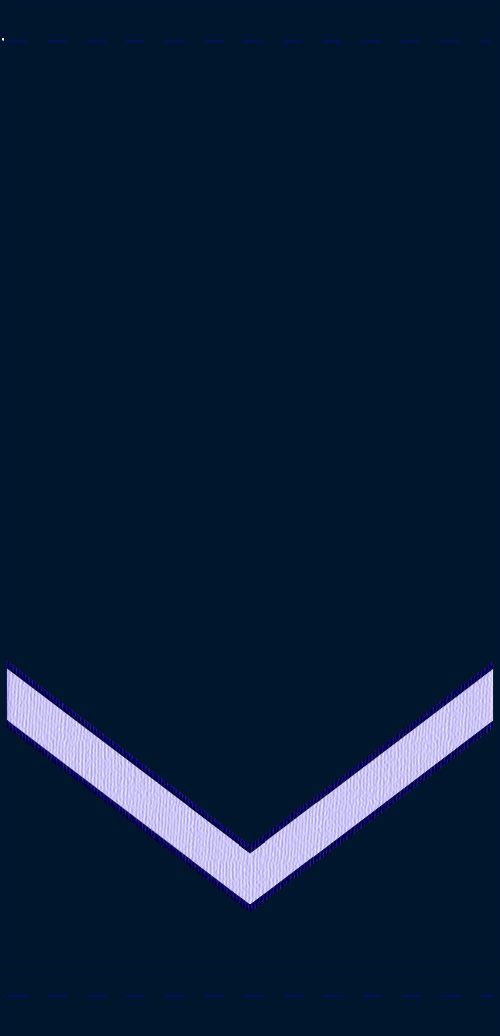
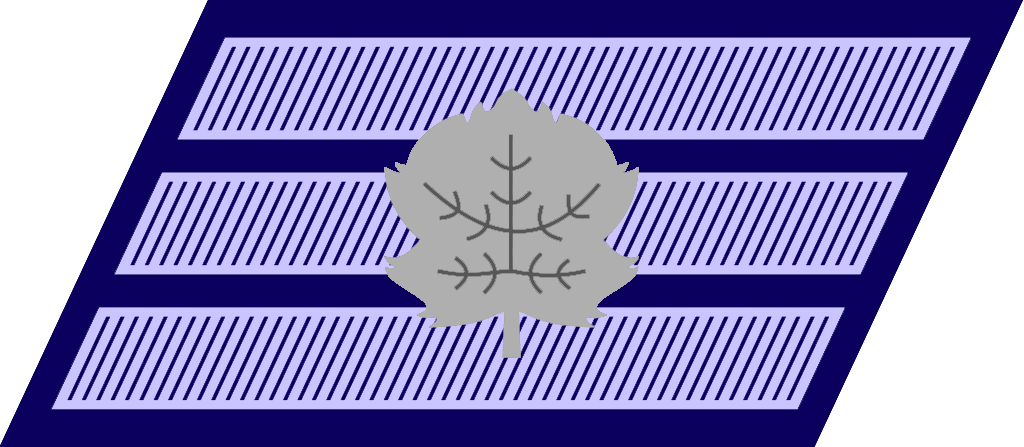
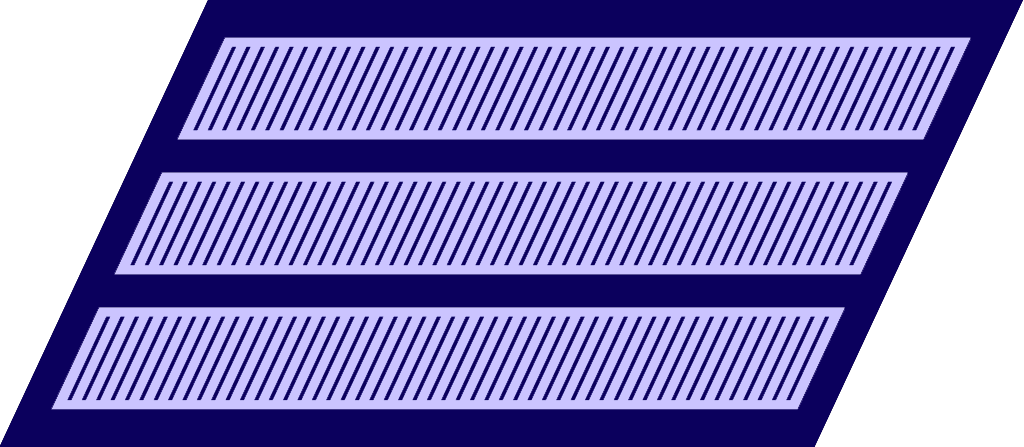
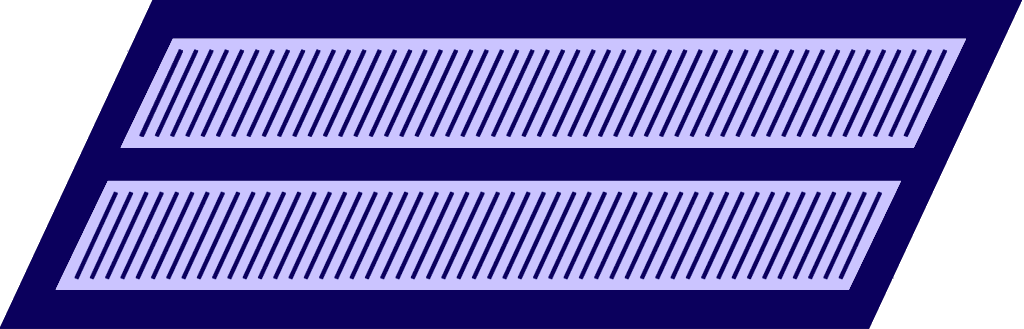
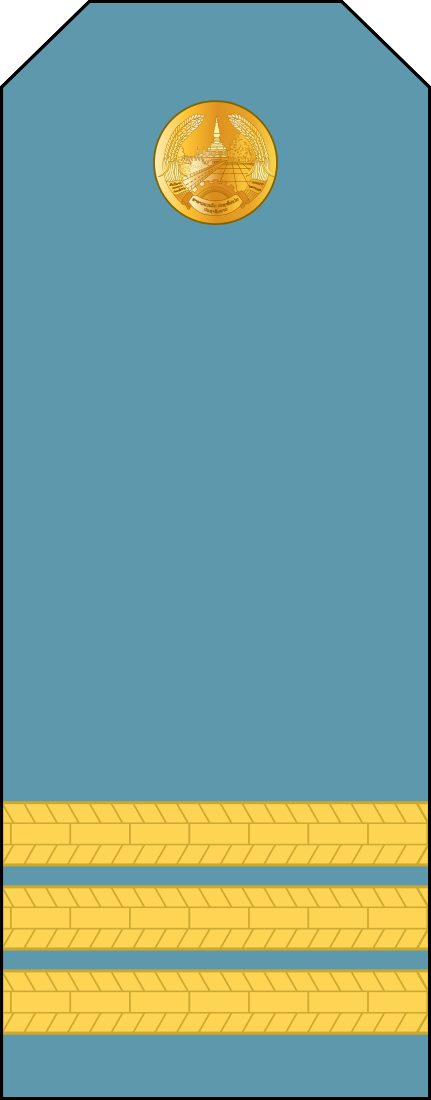
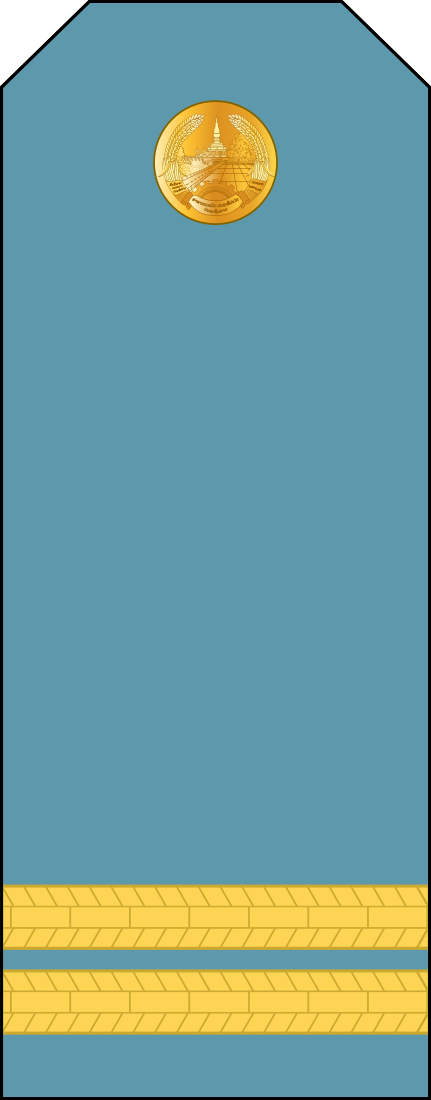
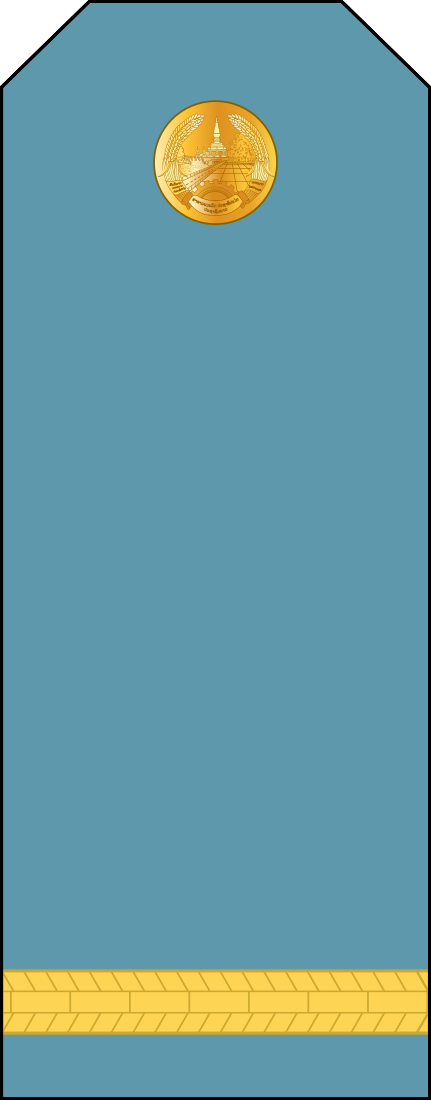
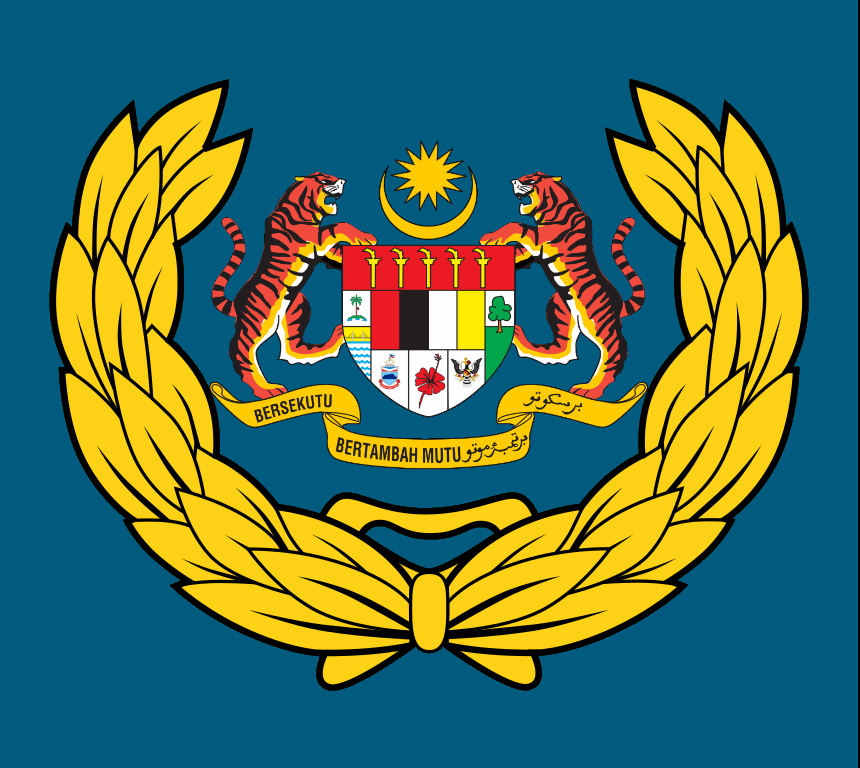
Rank group	Senior NCOs											Junior NCOs			Enlisted
Islamic Emirate of Afghanistan	No rank structure
Armenian Air Force
Armenian Air Force	ԱՎԱԳ ԵՆԹԱՍՊԱ; Avag yent’aspa		ԵՆԹԱՍՊԱ; Yent’aspa	ԱՎԱԳ; Avag		ԱՎԱԳ ՍԵՐԺԱՆՏ; Avag serzhant		ՍԵՐԺԱՆՏ; Serzhant		ԿՐՏՍԵՐ ՍԵՐԺԱՆՏ; Krtser Serzhant		ԵՖՐԵՅՏՈՐ; Yefreytor		շարքային Shark’ayin
Azerbaijani Air Force															No insignia
Azerbaijani Air Force	Baş gizir		Gizir	Kiçik gizir		Baş çavuş		Çavuş		Kiçik çavuş		Baş əsgər			Əsgər
Royal Bahraini Air Force																	No insignia
Royal Bahraini Air Force						رقیب أول; Raqib 'awal				رقیب; Raqib		عريف; Earif			جندي أول; Jundiun awwal		جندي; Jundiun
Bangladesh Air Force																		No insignia
Bangladesh Air Force	মাস্টার ওয়ারেন্ট অফিসার; Māsṭār ōẏārēnṭ ôphisār			সিনিয়র ওয়ারেন্ট অফিসার; Siniẏar ōẏārēnṭ ôphisār		ওয়ারেন্ট অফিসার; Ōẏārēnṭ ôphisār		সার্জেন্ট; Sārjēnṭ				কর্পোর‍্যাল; Kôrpōral			লীডিং এয়ারক্র্যাফটম্যান; Līḍing ēẏārkrāphṭmaen		এয়ারক্র্যাফটম্যান-১; Ēẏārkrāphṭmaen-1	এয়ারক্র্যাফটম্যান-২; Ēẏārkrāphṭmaen-2
Bhutan	No air force
Royal Brunei Air Force															No insignia
Royal Brunei Air Force	Pegawai waran 1 (udara)			Pegawai waran 2 (udara)		Staf sarjan (udara)		Sarjan (udara)				Koperal (udara)		Lans koperal (udara)	Prebet/Soldadu (udara)
Royal Cambodian Air Force
Royal Cambodian Air Force	ព្រឹន្ទបាលឯក; Prœ̆ntôbal êk			ព្រឹន្ទបាលទោ Prœ̆ntôbal toŭ		ពលបាលឯក; Pôlôbal êk		ពលបាលទោ Pôlôbal toŭ		ពលបាលត្រី Pôlôbal trei		នាយឯក; Néay êk		នាយទោ Néay toŭ	ពលឯក; Pôl êk		ពលទោ Pôl toŭ
PLA Air Force
PLA Air Force	空军一级军士长; Kōngjūn yījí jūnshìzhǎng		空军二级军士长; Kōngjūn èrjí jūnshìzhǎng	空军三级军士长; Kōngjūn sānjí jūnshìzhǎng		空军四级军士长; Kōngjūn sìjí jūnshìzhǎng		空军上士; Kōngjūn shàngshì		空军中士; Kōngjūn zhōngshì		空军下士; Kōngjūn xiàshì			空军上等兵; Kōngjūn shàngděngbīng		空军列兵; Kōngjūn lièbīng
Republic of China Air Force
Republic of China Air Force	一等士官長; Yīděng shìguānzhǎng			二等士官長; Èrděng shìguānzhǎng		三等士官長; Sānděng shìguānzhǎng		上士; Shàngshì		中士; Zhōngshì		下士; Xiàshì		上等兵; Shàngděngbīng	一等兵; Yīděngbīng		二等兵; Èrděngbīng
Indian Air Force																	No insignia
Indian Air Force	Master warrant officer मास्टर वारंट अफसर			Warrant officer वारंट अफसर		Junior warrant officer जूनियर वारंट अफसर		Sergeant सार्जेंट				Corporal कॉरपोरल			Leading aircraftsman लीडिंग एयरक्राफ्ट्समैन		Aircraftsman एयरक्राफ्ट्समैन
Rank group	Senior NCOs											Junior NCOs			Enlisted
Indonesian Air Force
Indonesian Air Force	Pembantu letnan satu		Pembantu letnan dua	Sersan mayor		Sersan kepala		Sersan satu		Sersan dua		Kopral kepala	Kopral satu	Kopral dua	Prajurit kepala	Prajurit satu	Prajurit dua
Iranian Air Force
Iranian Air Force	استوار یکم; Ostovar yekom			استوار دوم; Ostovar dovom		گروهبان یکم; Goruhban yekom		گروهبان دوم; Goruhban dovom		گروهبان سوم; Goruhban sevom		سرجوخه; Sarjukheh		سرباز یکم; Sarbaz yekom	سرباز دوم; Sarbaz dovom		سرباز; Sarbaz
Iranian Air Force	Chief warrant officer			Warrant officer junior grade		Sergeant first class		Sergeant second class		Sergeant third class		Corporal		Private first class	Private second class		Private
Iraqi Air Force
Iraqi Air Force						رقيب أول; Raqib 'awal		رقیب; Raqib				عريف; Earif			جندي أول; Jundiun awwal		جندي; Jundiun
Israeli Air Force															No insignia
Israeli Air Force	רב-נגד; Rav nagad		רב-סמל בכיר; Rav samal bakhír	רב-סמל מתקדם; Rav samal mitkadem	רב-סמל ראשון; Rav samal rishon	רב-סמל; Rav samal		סמל ראשון; Samal rishon		סמל; Samal		רב טוראי; Rav turai			טוראי; Turai
Japan Air Self-Defense Force
Japan Air Self-Defense Force	空曹長; Kūsōchō					1等空曹; Ittō kūsō		2等空曹; Nitō kūsō		3等空曹; Santō kūsō		空士長; Kūshichō		1等空士; Ittō kūshi	2等空士; Nitō kūshi		自衛官候補生; Jieikan kōhosei
Royal Jordanian Air Force																	No insignia
Royal Jordanian Air Force	وكيل أول; Wakil 'awal			وكيل; Wakil		رقيب أول; Raqib 'awal		رقیب; Raqib				عريف; Earif			جندي أول; Jundiun awwal		جندي; Jundiun
Kazakh Air Defense Forces
Kazakh Air Defense Forces	Шебер-сержант; Şeber-serjant		Штаб-сержант; Ştab-serjant	Бірінші сыныпты сержант Birinşi sınıptı serjant	Екінші сыныпты сержант Ekinşi sınıptı serjant	Үшінші сыныпты сержант Üşinşi sınıptı serjant	Аға сержант Ağa serjant	Cержант; Serjant		Кіші сержант Kişi serjant		Ефрейтор; Efreĭtor		Қатардағы жауынгер Qatardağı jawınger
Korean People's Army Air Force
Korean People's Army Air Force	특무상사; T'ŭkmu-sangsa			상사; Sangsa		중사; Chungsa		하사; Hasa		상급병사; Sanggŭp-pyŏngsa		중급병사; Chungŭp-pyŏngsa		하급병사; Hagŭp-pyŏngsa	전사; Chŏnsa
Republic of Korea Air Force
Republic of Korea Air Force	원사; Wonsa			상사; Sangsa		중사; Jungsa		하사; Hasa		병장; Byeongjang		상등병; Sangdeungbyeong		일등병; Ildeungbyeong	이등병; Ideungbyeong
Kuwait Air Force																	No insignia
Kuwait Air Force	وكيل أول; Wakil 'awal			وكيل; Wakil		رقيب أول; Raqib 'awal		رقیب; Raqib				عريف; Earif			جندي أول; Jundiun awwal		جندي; Jundiun
Kyrgyz Air Force
Kyrgyz Air Force	Улук прапорщик Uluk praporsçik		Прапорщик; Praporsçik	Старшина; Starşina		Улук сержант Uluk serjant		Сержант; Serjant		Кенже сержант Kenje serjant		Ефрейтор; Efreytor		Катардагы жоокер Katardagı jooker
Lao People's Liberation Air Force
Lao People's Liberation Air Force				ວາທີ Va thi				ສິບເອກ; Sib ek		ສິບໂທ; Sib oth		ສິບຕີ Sib ti			ຊັ້ນຫນຶ່ງ; Sannung		ຊັ້ນສອງ; Sansong
Rank group	Senior NCOs											Junior NCOs			Enlisted
Lebanese Air Force																	No insignia
Lebanese Air Force	مؤهل أول; Muahal 'awal	مؤهل; Muahal	معاون أوّل; Maawan 'awal	معاون; Maawan				رقيب أوّل; Raqib awwl		رقيب; Raqīb		عريف أول; Earif 'awal		عريف; Earif	جندي أول; Jundiun 'awal		جندي; Jundiun
Royal Malaysian Air Force															No insignia		No insignia
Royal Malaysian Air Force	Pegawai Waran Udara I			Pegawai Waran Udara II		Flait Sarjan		Sarjan Udara				Koperal Udara		Laskar Udara Kanan	Laskar Udara I		Laskar Udara II	Perajurit Muda
Maldives Air Corps																	No insignia
Maldives Air Corps	ސާރޖަންޓް މޭޖަރ އޮފް އެމްއެންޑީއެފް Saarjant meyjar of emendeeef	ކޮމާންޑް ސާރޖަންޓް މޭޖަރ; Komaand saarjant meyjar	ސާރޖަންޓް މޭޖަރ; Saarjant meyjar	ފަސްޓް ސާރޖަންޓް Fast saarjant		ސާރޖަންޓް ފަސްޓް ކްލާސް Saarjant fast klaas		ސްޓާފް ސާރޖަންޓް Staaf saarjant		ސާރޖަންޓް Saarjant		ކޯޕްރަލް Koapral		ލާންސް ކޯޕްރަލް Laans koapral			ޕްރައިވެޓް Praivet
Mongolian Air Force
Mongolian Air Force	Тэргүүн ахлагч Tergüün akhlagch			Cургагч ахлагч Curgagch akhlagch		Aхлах ахлагч Akhlakh akhlagch		Aхлагч; Akhlagch		Дэд ахлагч Ded akhlagch		Ахлах түрүүч Akhlakh türüüch		Түрүүч; Türüüch	Дэд түрүүч Ded türüüch	Ахлах байлдагч Akhlakh baildagch	Байлдагч; Baildagch
Myanmar Air Force																	No insignia	No insignia
Myanmar Air Force	အရာခံဗိုလ် ’araākhaṃ bauilaʻ			ဒုတိယအရာခံဗိုလ် dautaiya ’araākhaṃ bauilaʻ		အုပ်ခွဲတပ်ကြပ်ကြီး aupaʻ khavai tapaʻ karpaʻ karīʺ		တပ်ကြပ်ကြီး tapaʻ karpaʻ karīʺ				တပ်ကြပ် tapaʻ karpaʻ		ဒုတိယတပ်ကြပ် dautaiya tapaʻ karpaʻ			တပ်သား tapaʻ saāʺ	တပ်သားသစ် tapaʻ saāʺ sacaʻ
Nepalese Army Air Service															No insignia		No insignia
Nepalese Army Air Service	प्रमुख सुवेदार; Pramukh Suvēdār			सुवेदार; Suvēdār		जमदार; Jamadār		हुद्दा Huddā				अमल्दार; Amaldār		प्यूठ; Piyuth	सिपाही Sipahi		फलोअर्स; Phaloars
Nepalese Army Air Service	Chief warrant officer			Warrant officer first class		Warrant officer second class		Sergeant				Corporal		Lance corporal	Private		Followers
Royal Air Force of Oman															No insignia
Royal Air Force of Oman	وکیل کتیبة; Wakil katiba			وکیل; Wakil		رقیب اول; Raqib 'awal		رقیب; Raqib				عریف; Earif		نائب عریف; Nayib earif	جندي; Jundiun
Pakistan Air Force
Pakistan Air Force	Chief warrant officer			Warrant officer		Assistant warrant officer		Senior technician				Corporal technician		Junior technician	Senior aircraftman	Leading aircraftman	Aircraftman
Philippine Air Force
Philippine Air Force	Chief master sergeant		Senior master sergeant	Master sergeant		Technical sergeant		Staff sergeant		Sergeant		Airman first class			Airman second class		Airman
Qatar Emiri Air Force															No insignia
Qatar Emiri Air Force	وكيل اول; Wakil awwal			وكيل ثاني; Wakil thani		رقيب; Raqib		نائب; Nayib				عريف; Earif		وكيل عريف; Wakil earif	جندي; Jundi
Rank group	Senior NCOs											Junior NCOs			Enlisted
Russian Aerospace Forces
Russian Aerospace Forces	Ста́рший пра́порщик Stárshiy práporshchik		Пра́порщик; Práporshchyk	Старшина́ Starshyná		Ста́рший сержа́нт Stárshiy serzhánt		Сержа́нт; Serzhánt		Мла́дший сержа́нт Mládshiy serzhánt		Ефре́йтор; Efréĭtor		Рядово́й; Ryadovóy
Royal Saudi Air Force																	No insignia
Royal Saudi Air Force	رئيس رقباء; Rayiys ruqaba'			رقيب أول; Raqib 'awal		رقيب; Raqib		وكيل رقيب; Wakil raqib				عريف; Earif			جندي أول; Jundiun awwal		جندي; Jundiun
Republic of Singapore Air Force																	No insignia	No insignia
Republic of Singapore Air Force	Master sergeant			Staff sergeant		First sergeant		Second sergeant		Third sergeant		Corporal first class	Corporal	Lance corporal	Private first class		Private	Recruit
Sri Lanka Air Force																	No insignia
Sri Lanka Air Force	Master warrant officer			Warrant officer		Flight sergeant		Sergeant				Corporal			Leading aircraftman		Aircraftman
Syrian Air Force																	No insignia
Syrian Air Force	مساعد أول; Musaeid 'awal		مساعد ثاني; Musaeid thani	مساعد; Musaeid		رقيب أول; Raqib 'awal		رقيب ثاني; Raqib thani		رقيب; Raqib		عريف; Earif			جندي أول; Jundiun 'awal		جندي; Jundiun
Tajik Air Force
Tajik Air Force	Прапоршики калон Praporshiki kalon		Прапоршик; Praporshik	Старшина; Starshyna		Сержанти калон Serzhanti kalon		Сержант; Serzhant		Сержанти хурд Serzhanti xurd		Ефрейтор; Efreytor		Қаторӣ; Qatorī
Royal Thai Air Force																	No insignia
Royal Thai Air Force	พันจ่าอากาศเอก; Phan cha akat ek			พันจ่าอากาศโท; Phan cha akat tho		พันจ่าอากาศตรี Phan cha akat tri				จ่าอากาศเอก; Cha akat ek		จ่าอากาศโท; Cha akat tho			จ่าอากาศตรี Cha akat tri		พลทหาร; Phon thahan
Timor-Leste	No air force
Turkmen Air Force
Turkmen Air Force				Starşina		Uly seržant		Seržant		Kiçi seržant				Hatarçy
United Arab Emirates Air Force																	No insignia
United Arab Emirates Air Force				مساعد أول; Musa'id 'awal		مساعد; Musa'id				رقیب; Raqib		عريف; Earif			جندي أول; Jundi awwal		جندي; Jundi
Uzbek Air Defense Forces and Air Force
Uzbek Air Defense Forces and Air Force						Katta serjant		I darajali serjant	II darajali serjant	III darajali serjant	Kichik serjant			Oddiy askar
Vietnam People's Air Force
Vietnam People's Air Force				Thượng sĩ				Trung sĩ				Hạ sĩ			Binh nhất		Binh nhì
Yemeni Air Force																	No insignia
Yemeni Air Force	Warrant officer					Flight sergeant		Sergeant				Senior Airman		Airman First Class			Airman جندي
Rank group	Senior NCOs											Junior NCOs			Enlisted

== See also ==
- Comparative air force officer ranks of Asia
- Air force officer rank insignia
