= Comparative air force enlisted ranks of Post-Soviet states =

Rank comparison chart of enlisted for all air forces of Post-Soviet states.

== Enlisted (OR 1–9) ==
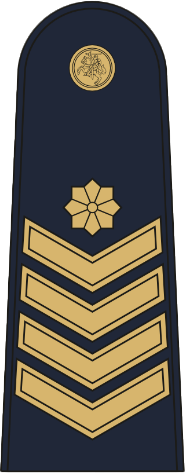
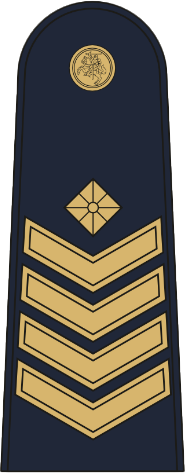
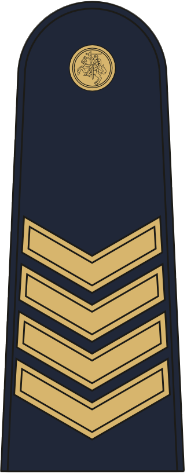
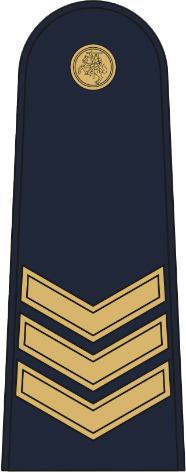
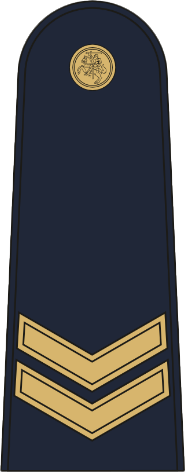
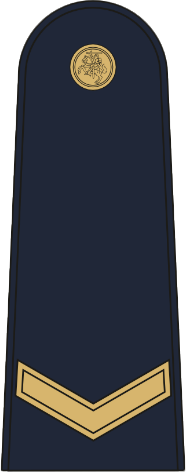
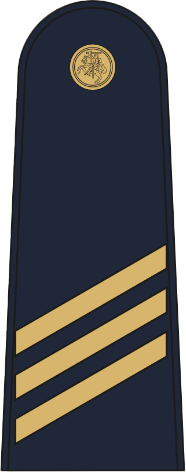
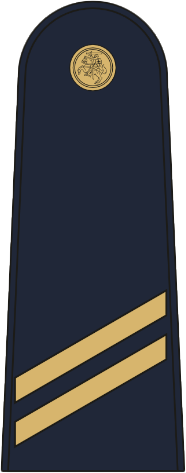
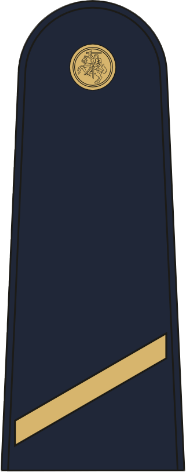
Rank group	Senior NCOs										Junior NCOs			Enlisted
Armenian Air Force
Armenian Air Force	ԱՎԱԳ ԵՆԹԱՍՊԱ; Avag yent’aspa	ԵՆԹԱՍՊԱ; Yent’aspa	ԱՎԱԳ; Avag		ԱՎԱԳ ՍԵՐԺԱՆՏ; Avag serzhant		ՍԵՐԺԱՆՏ; Serzhant		ԿՐՏՍԵՐ ՍԵՐԺԱՆՏ; Krtser Serzhant		ԵՖՐԵՅՏՈՐ; Yefreytor		շարքային Shark’ayin
Azerbaijani Air Force														No insignia
Azerbaijani Air Force	Baş gizir	Gizir	Kiçik gizir		Baş çavuş		Çavuş		Kiçik çavuş		Baş əsgər			Əsgər
Belarusian Air Force
Belarusian Air Force	Старшы прапаршчык Staršy praparščyk	Прапаршчык; Praparščyk	Старшына; Staršyna		Старшы сяржант Staršy siaržant		Сяржант; Siaržant		Малодшы сяржант Malodšy siaržant		Яфрэйтар; Jafrejtar		Радавы; Radavy
Estonian Air Force
Estonian Air Force	Ülemveebel	Staabiveebel	Vanemveebel		Veebel		Nooremveebel		Vanemseersant		Seersant	Nooremseersant		Kapral	Reamees
Georgian Air Force
Georgian Air Force	მთავარი სერჟანტი Mtavari serzhant’i		მასტერ-სერჟანტი Mast’er-serzhant’i		უფროსი სერჟანტი Uprosi serzhant’i				სერჟანტი Serzhant’i		უმცროსი სერჟანტი Umtsrosi serzhant’i	კაპრალ-სპეციალისტი K’ap’ral-sp’etsialist’i	კაპრალი K’ap’rali	I კლასის რიგითი I k’lasis rigiti	რიგითი Rigiti
Rank group	Senior NCOs										Junior NCOs			Enlisted
Kazakh Air Defense Forces
Kazakh Air Defense Forces	Шебер-сержант; Şeber-serjant	Штаб-сержант; Ştab-serjant	Бірінші сыныпты сержант Birinşi sınıptı serjant	Екінші сыныпты сержант Ekinşi sınıptı serjant	Үшінші сыныпты сержант Üşinşi sınıptı serjant	Аға сержант Ağa serjant	Cержант; Serjant		Кіші сержант Kişi serjant		Ефрейтор; Efreĭtor		Қатардағы жауынгер Qatardağı jawınger
Kyrgyz Air Force
Kyrgyz Air Force	Улук прапорщик Uluk praporsçik	Прапорщик; Praporsçik	Старшина; Starşina		Улук сержант Uluk serjant		Сержант; Serjant		Кенже сержант Kenje serjant		Ефрейтор; Efreytor		Катардагы жоокер Katardagı jooker
Latvian Air Force
Latvian Air Force	Augstākais virsseržants		Galvenais virsseržants		Štāba virsseržants		Virsseržants		Seržants		Kaprālis		Dižkareivis	Kareivis
Lithuanian Air Force
Lithuanian Air Force	Seržantas majoras		Viršila		Štabo seržantas		Vyresnysis seržantas		Seržantas		Grandinis		Vyresnysis eilinis	Eilinis	Jaunesnysis eilinis
Moldova Air Force
Moldova Air Force	Plutonier-adjutant	Plutonier-major	Plutonier		Sergent-major		Sergent		Sergent-interior		Caporal		Soldat
Rank group	Senior NCOs										Junior NCOs			Enlisted
Russian Aerospace Forces
Russian Aerospace Forces	Ста́рший пра́порщик Stárshiy práporshchik	Пра́порщик; Práporshchyk	Старшина́ Starshyná		Ста́рший сержа́нт Stárshiy serzhánt		Сержа́нт; Serzhánt		Мла́дший сержа́нт Mládshiy serzhánt		Ефре́йтор; Efréĭtor		Рядово́й; Ryadovóy
Tajik Air Force
Tajik Air Force	Прапоршики калон Praporshiki kalon	Прапоршик; Praporshik	Старшина; Starshyna		Сержанти калон Serzhanti kalon		Сержант; Serzhant		Сержанти хурд Serzhanti xurd		Ефрейтор; Efreytor		Қаторӣ; Qatorī
Turkmen Air Force
Turkmen Air Force			Starşina		Uly seržant		Seržant		Kiçi seržant				Hatarçy
Ukrainian Air Force
Ukrainian Air Force	Головний майстер-сержант Holovnyi maister-serzhant	Старший майстер-сержант Starshyi maister-serzhant	Майстер-сержант; Maister-serzhant		Штаб-сержант; Shtab-serzhant		Головний сержант Holovnyi serzhant		Старший сержант Starshyi serzhant		Сержант; Serzhant		Молодший сержант Molodshyi serzhant	Старший солдат Starshyi soldat	Солдат; Soldat
Uzbek Air Defense Forces and Air Force
Uzbek Air Defense Forces and Air Force					Katta serjant		I darajali serjant	II darajali serjant	III darajali serjant	Kichik serjant			Oddiy askar
Rank group	Senior NCOs										Junior NCOs			Enlisted

== See also ==
- Comparative air force enlisted ranks of Asia
- Comparative air force enlisted ranks of Europe
