= Pakistan Air Force ranks and insignia =

The ranking structure as well as rank insignia of the Pakistan Air Force (PAF) are primarily based on the ranking structure of the United Kingdom's Royal Air Force. The insignia for PAF officer ranks underwent an extensive change in 2006, whereby British-influenced rank insignia were dropped for the adoption of Turkish-style insignia, while the British ranking style was maintained.

== Officer ranks ==
Rank group	General/Flag/Air officers					Senior officers			Junior officers
Pakistan Air Force
Pakistan Air Force	Marshal of the Pakistan Air Force	Air chief marshal	Air marshal	Air vice marshal	Air commodore	Group captain	Wing commander	Squadron leader	Flight lieutenant	Flying officer	Pilot officer
Pakistan Air Force	سالار فضائیہ	امیرسالار فضائیہ	سالار فضائیہ	سالار فضائیہ مقابل	عَمِيد الفضاء	سردار جماعت	شارف الجناح	قائدِ دستہ	نقیبِ پرواز	منصبِ طیار	منصبِ پائلٹ
Former ranks (1947–2006)
Former ranks (1947–2006)	Marshal of the Air Force	Air chief marshal	Air marshal	Air vice-marshal	Air commodore	Group captain	Wing commander	Squadron leader	Flight lieutenant	Flying officer	Pilot officer

=== Student officer ranks ===
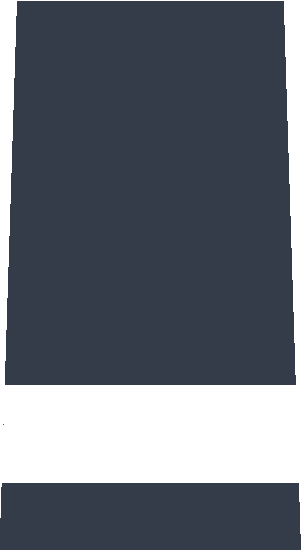
Rank group	Student officers
Pakistan Air Force
Pakistan Air Force	Officer cadet

=== Rank flags ===
Marshal of the Pakistan Air Force	Air chief marshal	Air marshal	Air vice marshal	Air commodore

== Enlisted ==
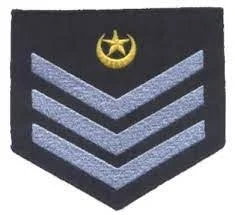
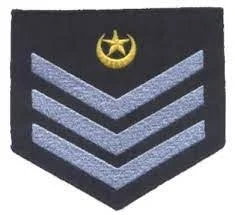
Rank group	Junior commissioned officers			Non commissioned officer				Enlisted
Pakistan Air Force
Pakistan Air Force	Chief warrant officer	Warrant officer	Assistant warrant officer	Chief technician	Senior technician	Corporal technician	Junior technician	Senior aircraftman	Leading aircraftman	Aircraftman
Former ranks (c. 1983–2006)
Former ranks (c. 1983–2006)	Master warrant officer	Warrant officer		Chief technician	Senior technician	Corporal technician	Junior technician	Senior aircraftman	Leading aircraftman	Aircraftman
(1947–)
(1947–)	Master warrant officer	Warrant officer		Chief technician	Senior technician	Corporal technician	Junior technician	Senior aircraftman	Leading aircraftman	Aircraftman

== See also ==
- Pakistan Army ranks and insignia
- Pakistan Navy ranks and insignia
