= Military ranks of the Kingdom of Bulgaria =

The Military ranks of the Kingdom of Bulgaria were the military insignia used by the Kingdom of Bulgaria. Following the abolition of the monarchy, the ranks were also changed.

== Commissioned officer ranks ==
The rank insignia of commissioned officers.

| Rank group | General / flag officers | | | Senior officers | | | Junior officers |
|---|---|---|---|---|---|---|---|---|---|---|
| (Tsardom of Bulgaria (1908–1946)) Royal Bulgarian Army & Air Force |
| (Tsardom of Bulgaria (1908–1946)) Royal Bulgarian Army & Air Force | Генерал-полковник; General-pukovnik | Генерал-лейтенант; General-leytenant | Генерал-майор; General-mayor | Полковник; Polkovnik | Подполковник; Podpolkovnik | Майор; Mayor | Капитан; Kapitan | Старши лейтенант Starshi leytenant | Лейтенант; Leytenant | Офицерски кандидатъ Ofitserski kandidat |
| Royal Bulgarian Navy |
| Royal Bulgarian Navy | Адмирал; Admiral | Вицеадмирал; Vitseadmiral | Контраадмирал; Kontraadmiral | Капитан I ранг Kapitan I rang | Капитан II ранг Kapitan II rang | Капитан III ранг Kapitan III rang | Лейтенант; Leytenant | Мичман I ранг Michman I rang | Мичман II ранг Michman II rang | Офицерски кандидатъ Ofitserski kandidat |
| Rank group | General / flag officers | | | Senior officers | | | Junior officers |

== Royal insignia ==
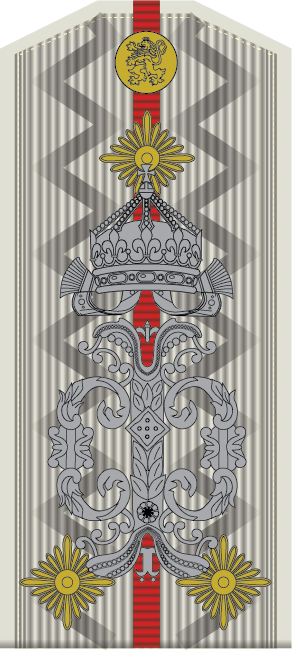
| Rank group | Monarch |
|---|---|
Ferdinand I

== Other ranks ==
The rank insignia of non-commissioned officers and enlisted personnel.

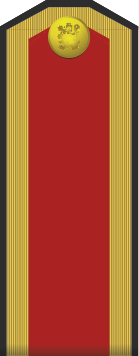
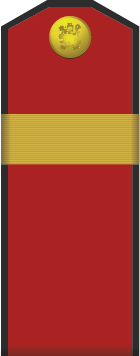
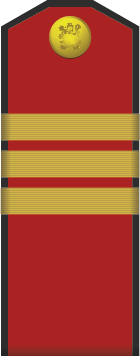
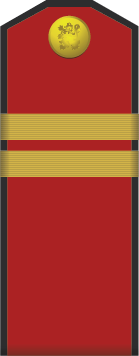
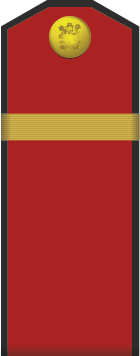
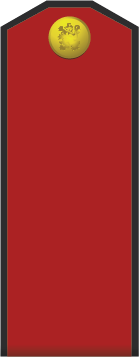
| Rank group | Senior NCOs | | | | Junior NCOs | Enlisted |
|---|---|---|---|---|---|---|
| (Tsardom of Bulgaria (1908–1946)) Royal Bulgarian Army & Air Force |
| (Tsardom of Bulgaria (1908–1946)) Royal Bulgarian Army & Air Force | Старшина; Starshyna | Старши сержант Starshi serzhant | Сержант; Serzhant | Младши сержант Mladshi serzhant | Ефрейтор; Efreytor | Редник; Rednik |
| Royal Bulgarian Navy |
| Royal Bulgarian Navy | Старшина; Starshyna | Старши сержант Starshi serzhant | Сержант; Serzhant | Младши сержант Mladshi serzhant | Ефрейтор; Efreytor | Редник; Rednik |
| Rank group | Senior NCOs | | | | Junior NCOs | Enlisted |

== See also ==
- Military ranks of the Bulgarian People's Army
- Military ranks of Bulgaria
