= Military ranks of the Bulgarian People's Army =

The Military ranks of the Bulgarian People's Army were the military insignia used by the Bulgarian People's Army. Being a Marxist–Leninist one–party socialist republic, and a country that was traditionally close to the Soviet Union, the Bulgaria People's Army shared a similar design of insignia to those of the Soviet Union.

== Commissioned officer ranks ==
The rank insignia of commissioned officers.

Rank group	General / flag officers				Senior officers			Junior officers
Bulgarian Land Forces
Bulgarian Land Forces	Армейски генерал Armeĭski general	Генерал-лейтенант; General-leytenant	Генерал-майор; General-mayor	Бригаден генерал Brigaden general	Полковник; Polkovnik	Подполковник; Podpolkovnik	Майор; Mayor	Капитан; Kapitan	Старши лейтенант Starshi leĭtenant	Лейтенант; Leĭtenant	Младши лейтенант Mladshi leĭtenant
Bulgarian Navy
Bulgarian Navy		Адмирал; Admiral	Вицеадмирал; Vitseadmiral	Контраадмирал; Kontraadmiral	Капитан I ранг Kapitan I rang	Капитан II ранг Kapitan II rang	Капитан III ранг Kapitan III rang	Капитан-лейтенант; Kapitan-leytenant	Старши лейтенант Starshi leĭtenant	Лейтенант; Leytenant	Младши лейтенант Mladshi leĭtenant
Bulgarian Air Force
Bulgarian Air Force		Генерал-лейтенант; General-leytenant	Генерал-майор; General-mayor	Бригаден генерал Brigaden general	Полковник; Polkovnik	Подполковник; Podpolkovnik	Майор; Mayor	Капитан; Kapitan	Старши лейтенант Starshi leĭtenant	Лейтенант; Leĭtenant	Младши лейтенант Mladshi leĭtenant
Rank group	General / flag officers				Senior officers			Junior officers

== Other ranks ==
The rank insignia of non-commissioned officers and enlisted personnel.

Rank group	Senior NCOs				Junior NCOs	Enlisted
Bulgarian Land Forces
Bulgarian Land Forces	Старшина; Starshyna	Старши сержант Starshi serzhant	Сержант; Serzhant	Младши сержант Mladshi serzhant	Ефрейтор; Efreytor	Редник; Rednik
Bulgarian Air Force
Bulgarian Air Force	Старшина; Starshyna	Старши сержант Starshi serzhant	Сержант; Serzhant	Младши сержант Mladshi serzhant	Ефрейтор; Efreytor	Редник; Rednik
Rank group	Senior NCOs				Junior NCOs	Enlisted

== See also ==
- Military ranks of the Kingdom of Bulgaria
- Military ranks of Bulgaria
