= Matros =

Matros is a term for sailor, seaman, mariner, or seafarer in several languages. It may also refer to:

- Matros (surname)

== Military ==
- Matros, a rank in the Norwegian military
- Матрос (matros), an enlisted rank in the Bulgarian Navy
- Матрос (matros), an enlisted rank in the Ukrainian Navy
- Матрос (matros), an enlisted rank in the Russian and former Soviet Navy

== See also ==
- Matrose, German for "sailor"
- Matross, an archaic English soldier of artillery
- Matro, a Swiss mountain
