= Military ranks of Bulgaria =

The Military ranks of Bulgaria are the military insignia used by the Bulgarian Armed Forces.

== Commissioned officer ranks ==
The rank insignia of commissioned officers.

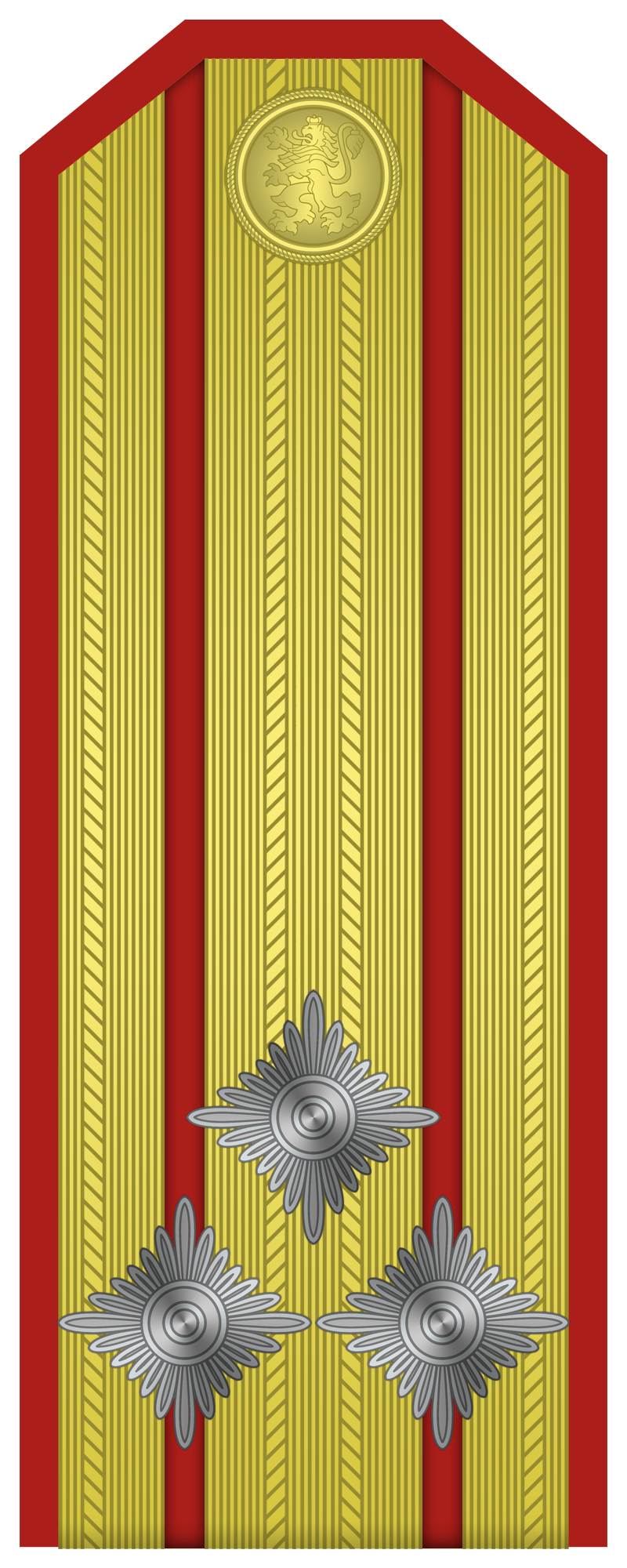
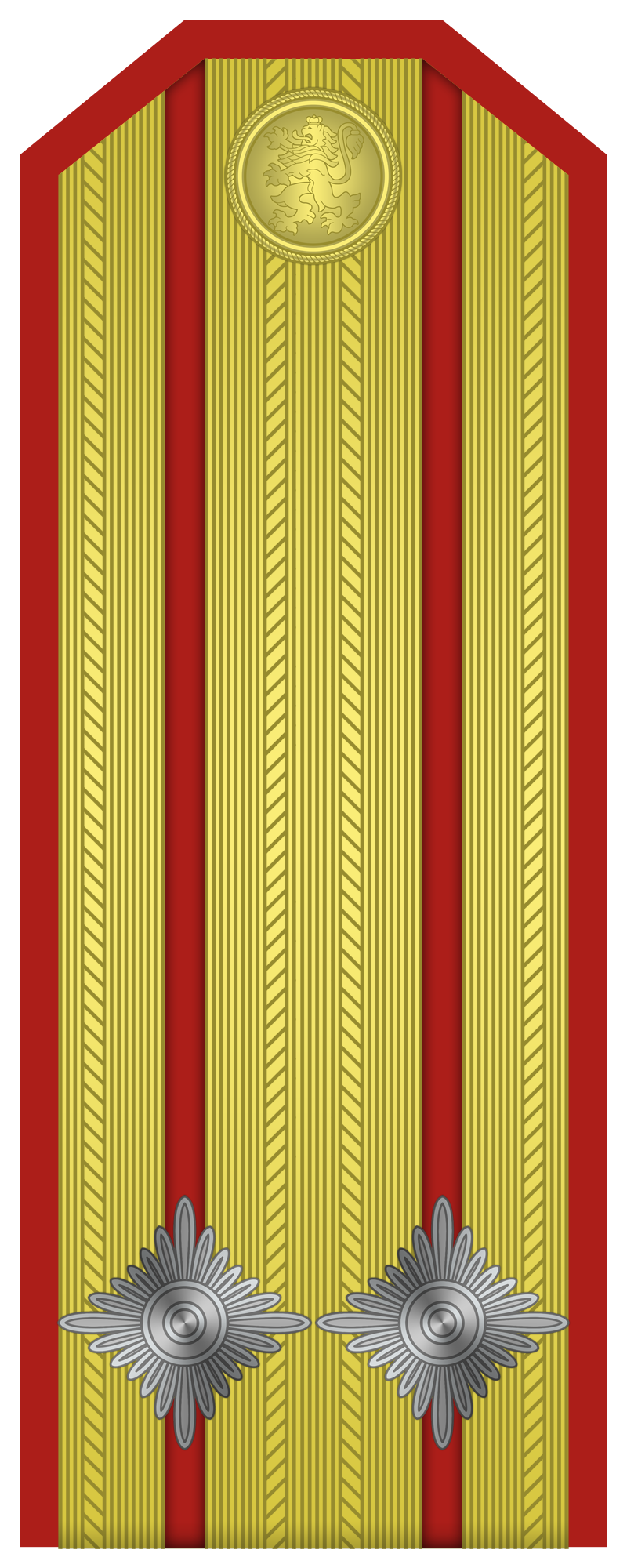
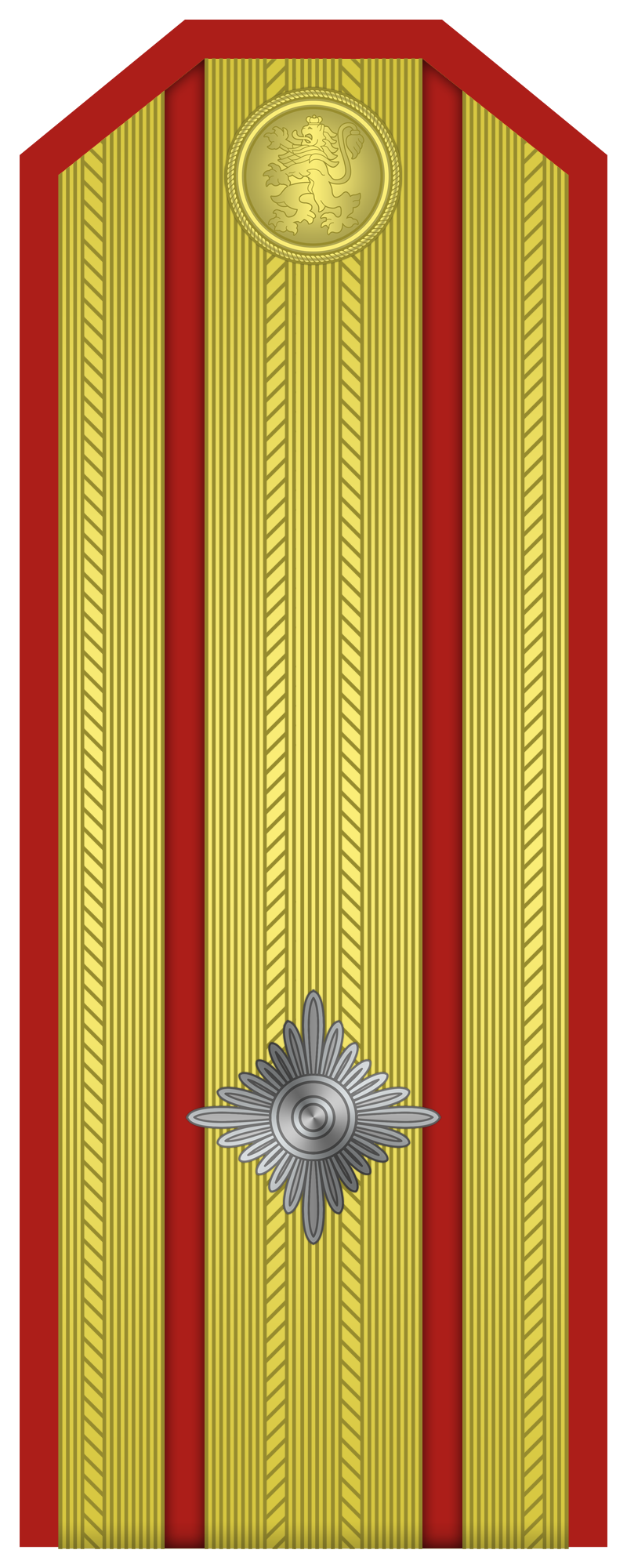
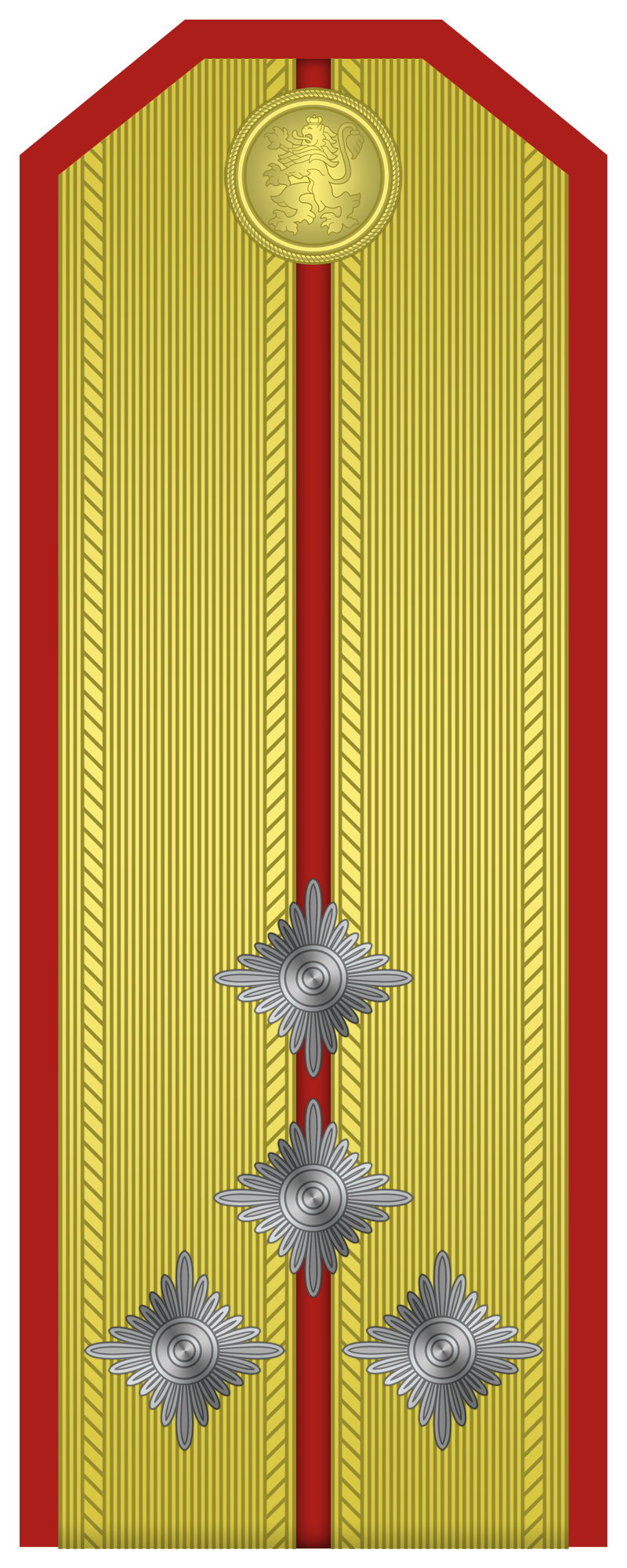
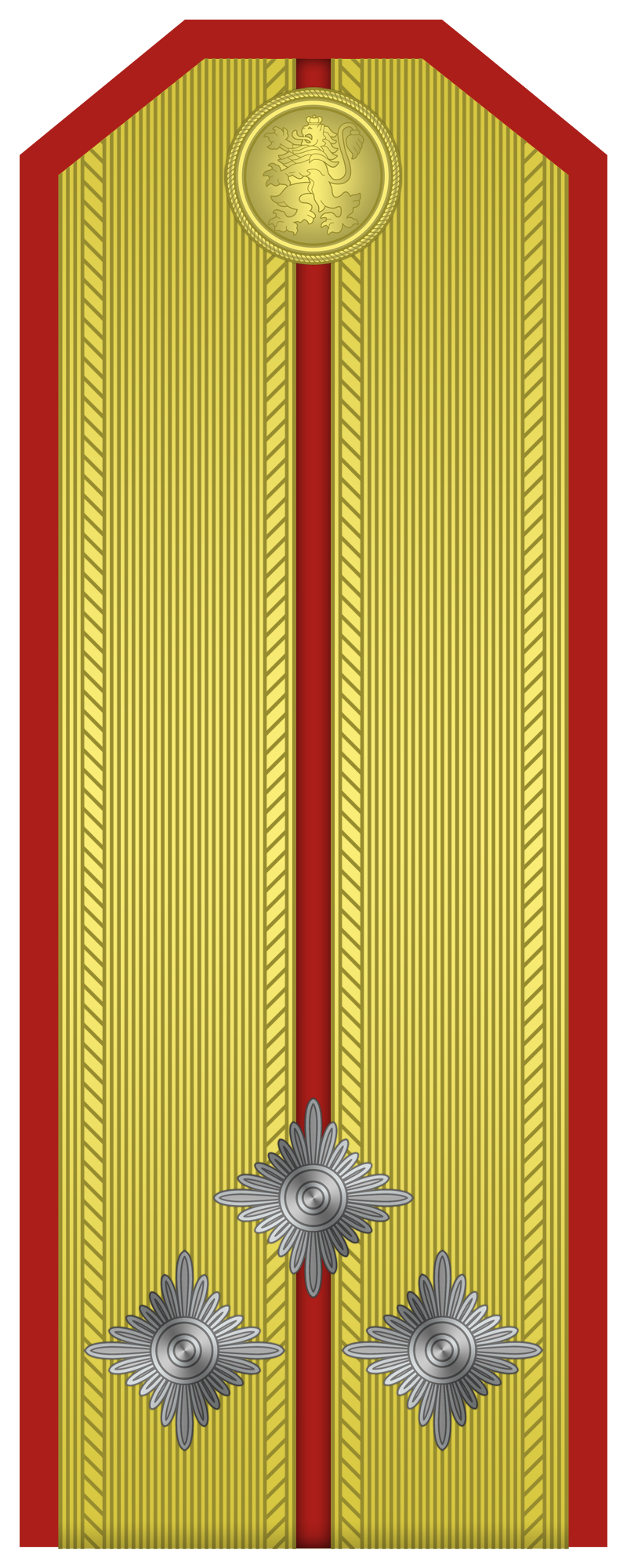
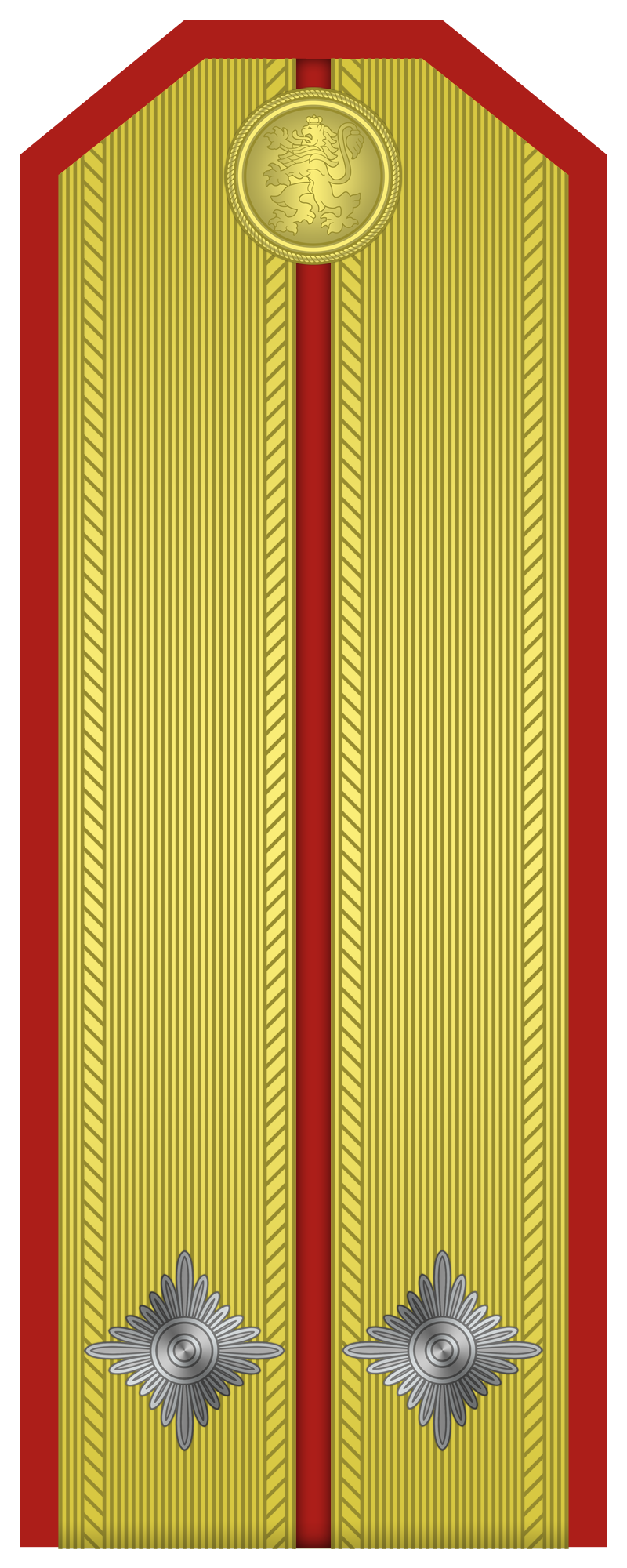
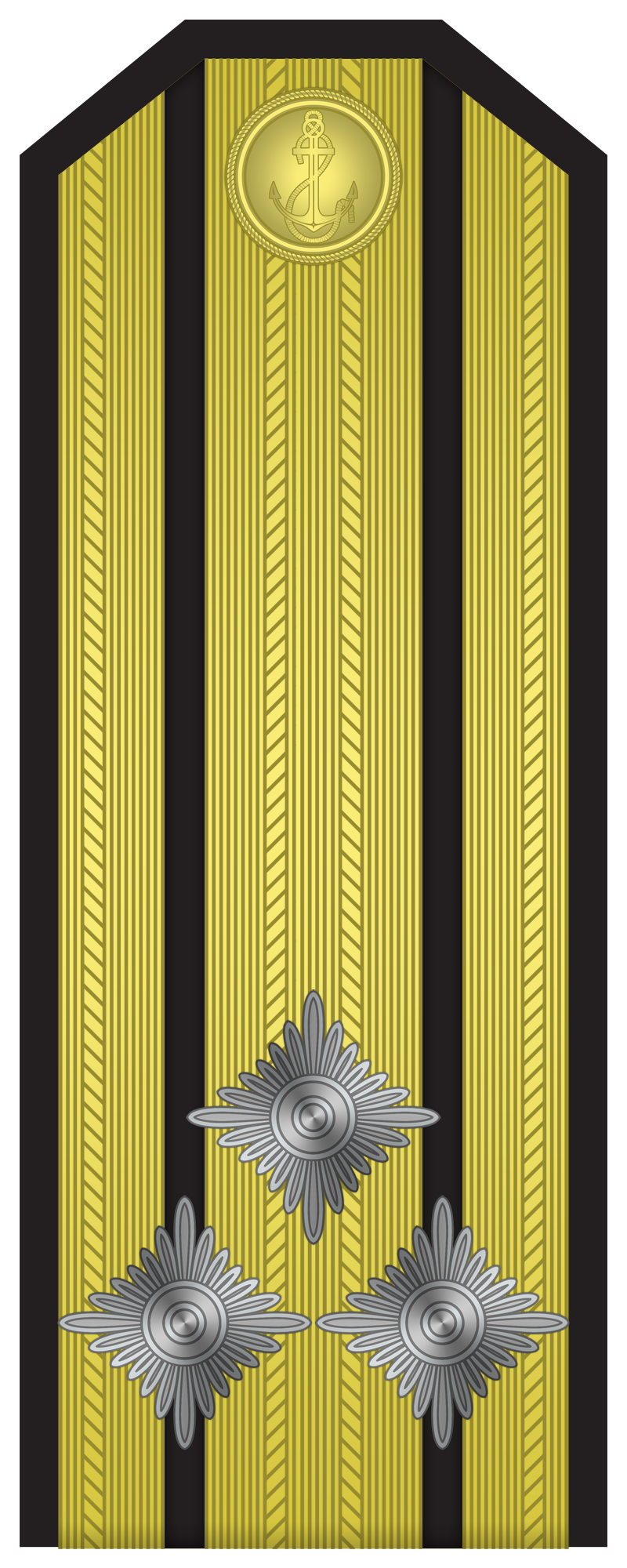
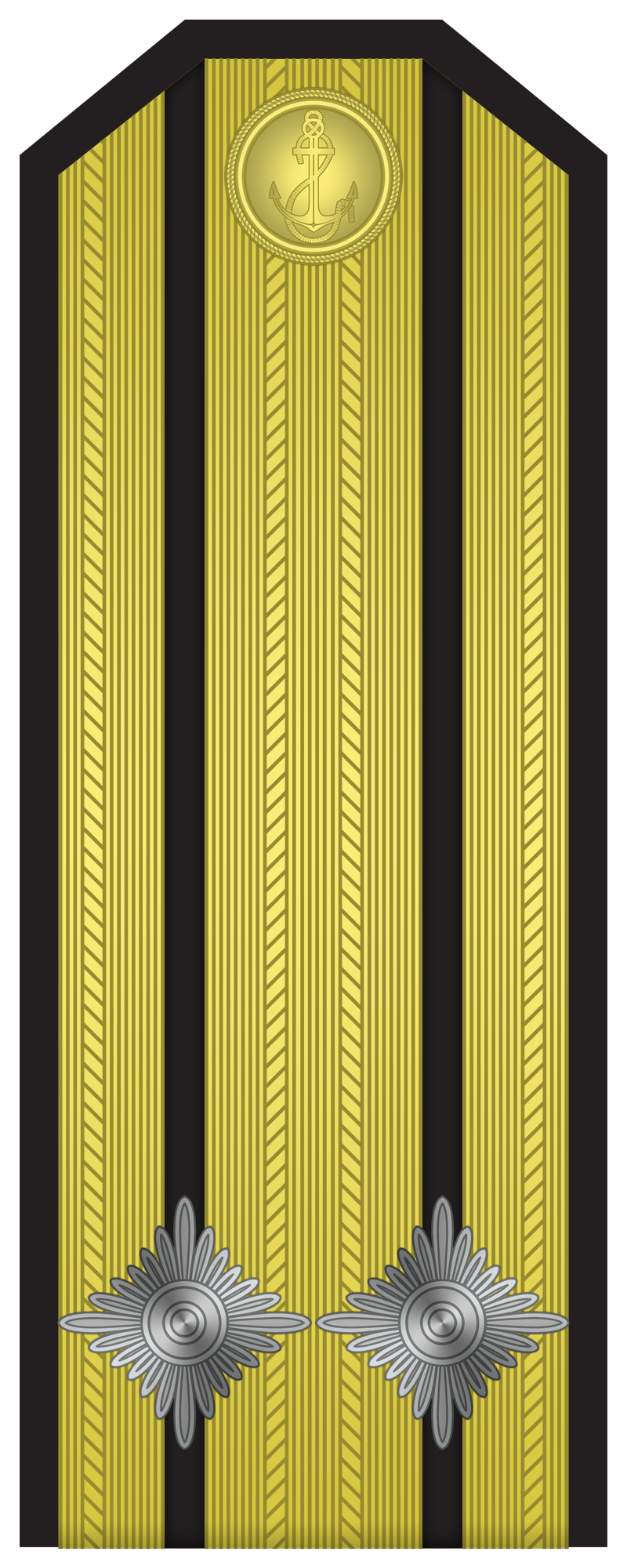
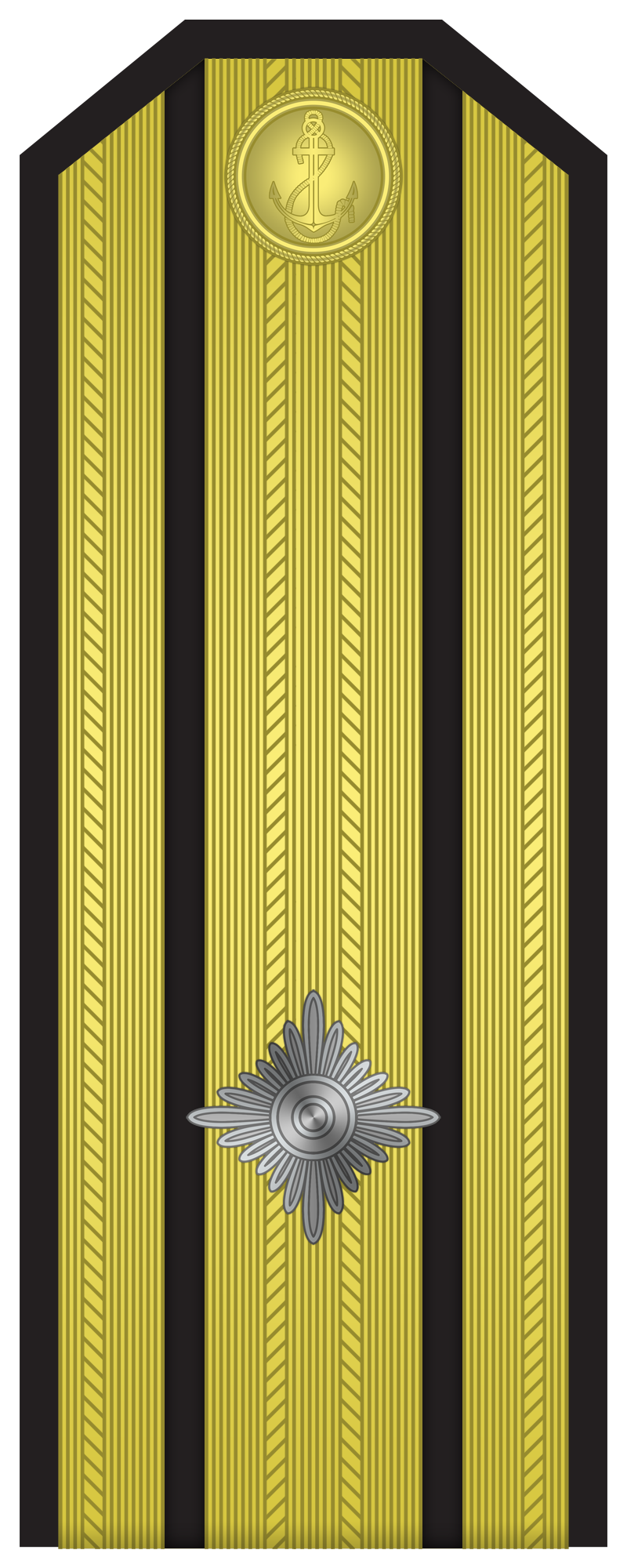
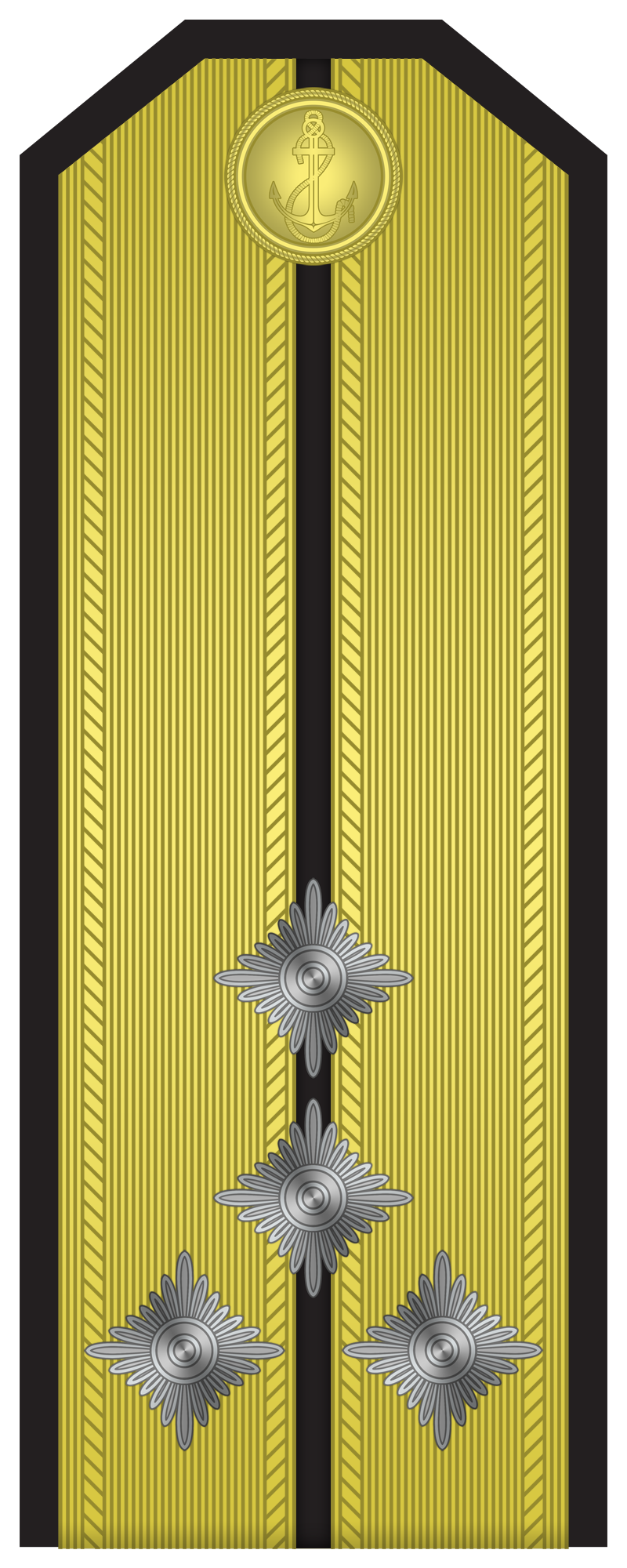
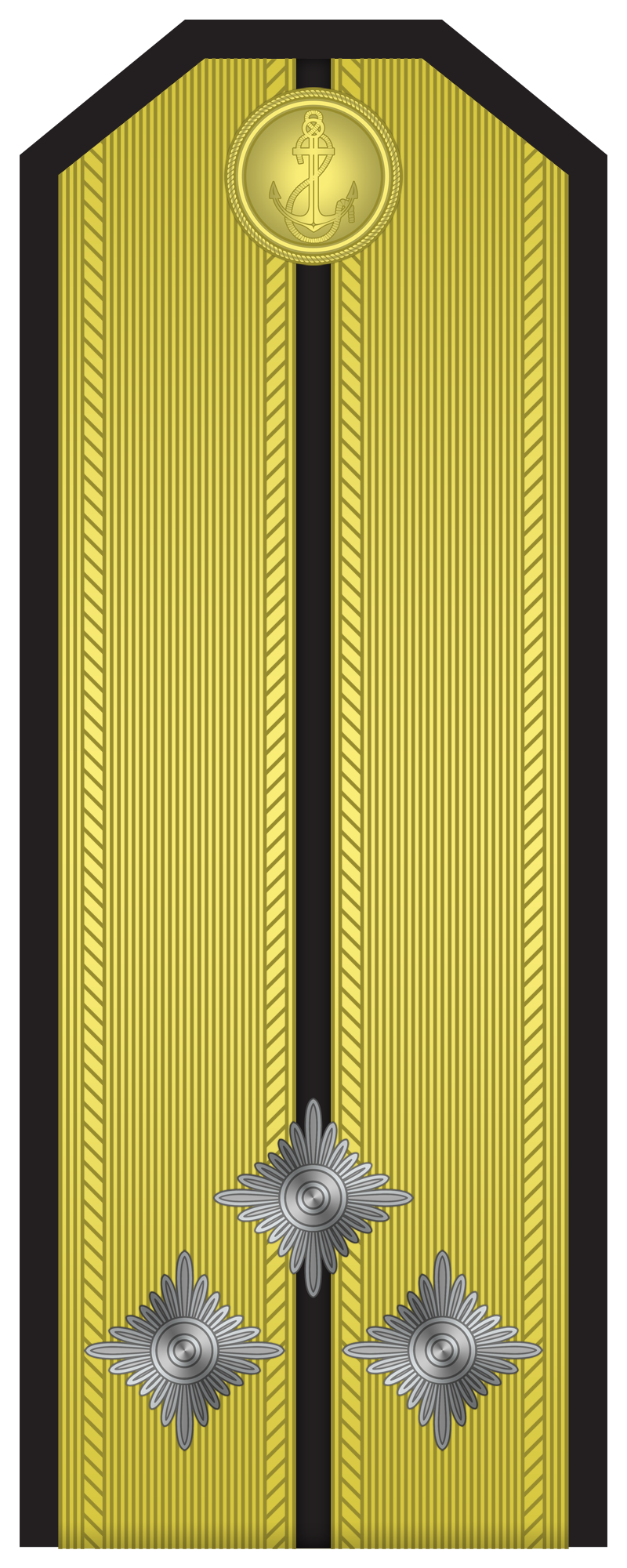
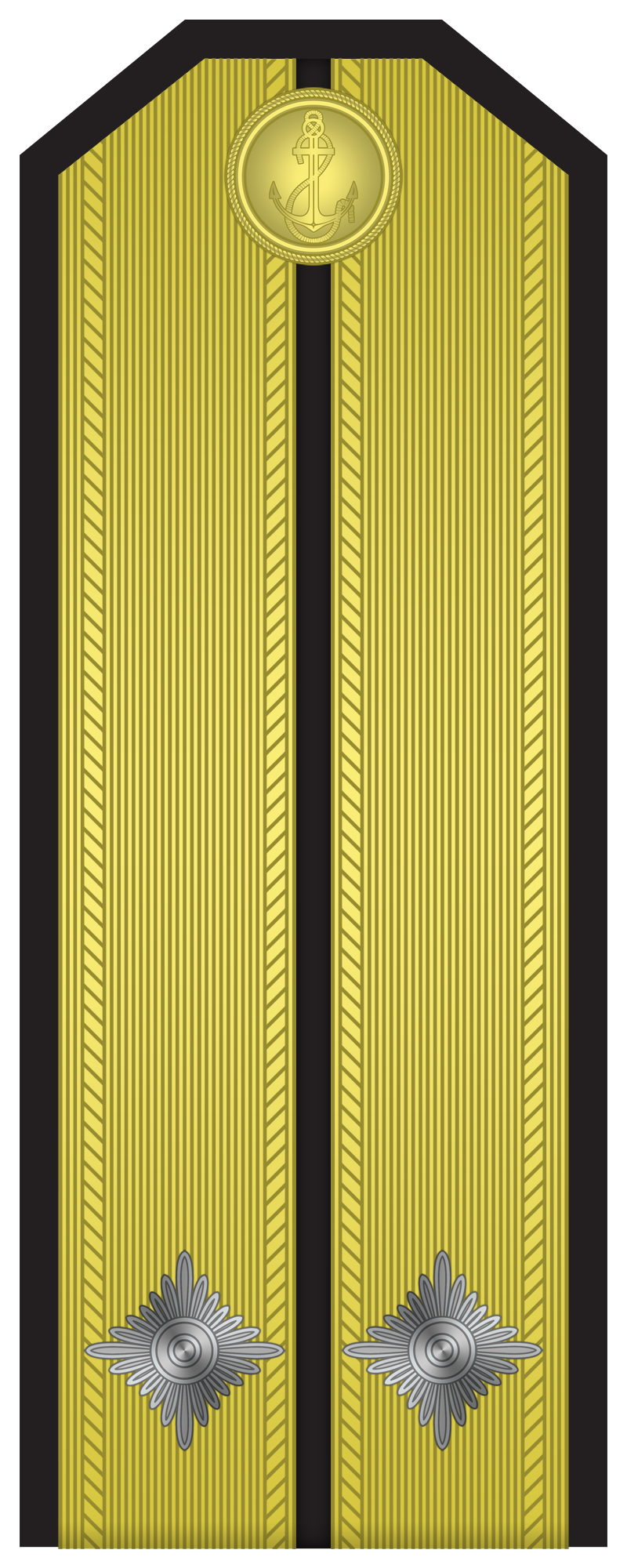
NATO code	OF-10	OF-9	OF-8	OF-7	OF-6	OF-5	OF-4	OF-3	OF-2	OF-1
Bulgarian Land Forces
Bulgarian Land Forces		Генерал; General	Генерал-лейтенант; General-leytenant	Генерал-майор; General-mayor	Бригаден генерал Brigaden general	Полковник; Polkovnik	Подполковник; Podpolkovnik	Майор; Mayor	Капитан; Kapitan	Старши лейтенант Starshi leytenant	Лейтенант; Leytenant
Bulgarian Navy
Bulgarian Navy		Адмирал; Admiral	Вицеадмирал; Vitseadmiral	Контраадмирал; Kontraadmiral	Флотилен адмирал Flotilen admiral	Капитан I ранг Kapitan I rang	Капитан II ранг Kapitan II rang	Капитан III ранг Kapitan III rang	Капитан-лейтенант; Kapitan-leytenant	Старши лейтенант Starshi leĭtenant	Лейтенант; Leytenant
Bulgarian Air Force
Bulgarian Air Force		Генерал; General	Генерал-лейтенант; General-leytenant	Генерал-майор; General-mayor	Бригаден генерал Brigaden general	Полковник; Polkovnik	Подполковник; Podpolkovnik	Майор; Mayor	Капитан; Kapitan	Старши лейтенант Starshi leytenant	Лейтенант; Leytenant
NATO code	OF-10	OF-9	OF-8	OF-7	OF-6	OF-5	OF-4	OF-3	OF-2	OF-1

== Other ranks ==
The rank insignia of non-commissioned officers and enlisted personnel.

NATO code	OR-9	OR-8	OR-7	OR-6	OR-5	OR-4	OR-3	OR-2	OR-1
Bulgarian Land Forces
Bulgarian Land Forces	Офицерски кандидат Ofitserski kandidat	Старшина; Starshyna	Старши сержант Starshi serzhant	Сержант; Serzhant	Младши сержант Mladshi serzhant	Ефрейтор; Efreytor	Редник; Rednik
Bulgarian Navy
Bulgarian Navy	Офицерски кандидат Ofitserski kandidat	Мичман; Mičman	Главен старшина Glaven starshina	Старшина 1 степен Starshina 1 stepen	Старшина 2 степен Starshina 2 stepen	Старши матрос Starshi matros	Матрос; Matros
Bulgarian Air Force
Bulgarian Air Force	Офицерски кандидат Ofitserski kandidat	Старшина; Starshyna	Старши сержант Starshi serzhant	Сержант; Serzhant	Младши сержант Mladshi serzhant	Ефрейтор; Efreytor	Редник; Rednik
NATO code	OR-9	OR-8	OR-7	OR-6	OR-5	OR-4	OR-3	OR-2	OR-1

== See also ==
- Military ranks of the Kingdom of Bulgaria
- Military ranks of the Bulgarian People's Army
