= Matros (surname) =

Matros is a surname literally meaning "seaman" in several languages. Notable people with the surname include:

- Matt Matros, an American poker player
- Larisa Matros
- Matt Matros
- Yurii Matros
