= Matro =

Mountain in Switzerland

- Location within Switzerland

Highest point
- Elevation: 2,172 m (7,126 ft)
- Prominence: 69 m (226 ft)
- Parent peak: Piz Gannaretsch
- Coordinates: 46°24′36.5″N 08°55′28.8″E

Geography
- Location: Ticino, Switzerland
- Parent range: Lepontine Alps

The Matro (2,171 m) is a mountain of the Swiss Lepontine Alps, overlooking Giornico in the canton of Ticino. It lies at the southern end of the chain separating the main Leventina valley from the Blenio valley. An antenna is located on the summit.
