= Assistant warrant officer =

Assistant warrant officer is a rank in the Pakistan Air Force above chief technician and below warrant officer. It is equivalent to the Pakistan Army's naib subedar and the Pakistan Navy's chief petty officer.
