= Senior technician =

Senior technician is a rank in the Pakistan Air Force and a former rank in the British Royal Air Force, above corporal technician and below chief technician. It is equivalent to the Pakistan Army's Havildar and Petty Officer is equivalent in the Pakistan Navy. The British rank, which was only held by airmen in technical trades (with others keeping the rank of sergeant), existed between 1950 and 1964. British senior technicians wore three point-up chevrons.
