= Corporal technician =

Rank in some air forces

Corporal technician is a position in the Pakistan Air Force that was also a position in the air forces of other countries in the British Empire.

== Pakistan (present) ==
The position falls immediately below the rank senior technician and above the rank of junior technician.

The position is the equivalent of the Pakistan Armed Forces' rank of naik and the Pakistan Navy's rank of leading rate.

== Other countries (historically) ==
=== United Kingdom ===
The position was a non-commissioned officer position that fell immediately below the rank of senior technician and above the rank of junior technician.

The Royal Air Force rank was in use between about 1950 and 1964. It was limited to pilots on specialised exchanges (with others retaining the rank of corporal). British corporal specialists wore two modified chevrons to recognise their exchange.

=== Australia ===
The position was a non-commissioned officer position in the Royal Australian Air Force (RAAF) equivalent to corporal that fell immediately below the rank of senior technician.

=== Rhodesia (Zimbabwe) ===
The position was a non-commissioned officer position in the Rhodesian Air Force that fell immediately below the rank of senior technician and above the rank of junior technician.
