= Ryadovoy =

Lowest Russian and Soviet military rank

Ryadovoy Рядово́й
- Insignia used from 2006
- Country: Russia
- Service branch: Russian Ground Forces; Russian Air Force
- Formation: 1946
- Next higher rank: Yefreytor
- Equivalent ranks: Matros (Navy)

Related articles
- History: Red Army man

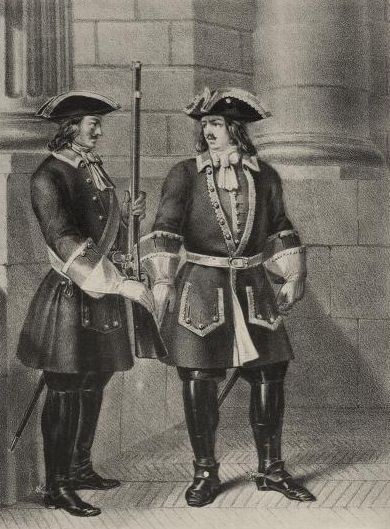
Ryadovoi and Officer of the Imperial Guard (1727–1730).

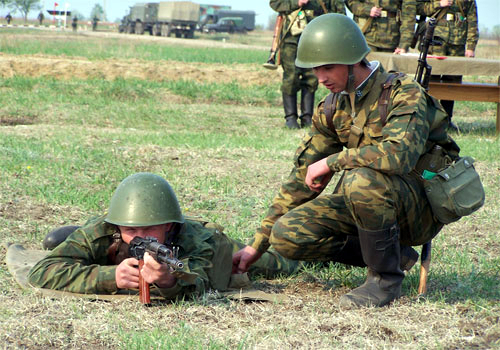
Squad leader instructing a ryadovoy.

Ryadovoy (Russian: Рядово́й) in the Army, Airborne troops, and Aerospace Force of Russia is the designation of a member of the rank group of enlisted personnel. The rank is equivalent to matros (Russian: матрос) in the Russian Navy. In the armed forces of the Soviet Union (and later in those of the Russian Federation) yefreytor is the second-lowest rank of enlisted personnel.

The word ryadovoy relates to the Russian ryad (Russian: ряд), which in a military context means "file" or "rank" (in the sense of "rank and file").

== History ==
The Imperial Russian Army used the designation ryadovoy before 1917. The rank re-appeared in the newly named Soviet Army in 1946, replacing the rank of "Red Army man" (Russian: красноармеец, romanized: krasnoarmeyets) used in the Red Army from 1918 to 1946.

== USSR ==
In the USSR Armed Forces the rank designation Ryadovoy was introduced in 1946. From 1919 to 1946 the designation to this particular rank was Krasnoarmeyets (literal: Red Army man or Red Army Soldier).

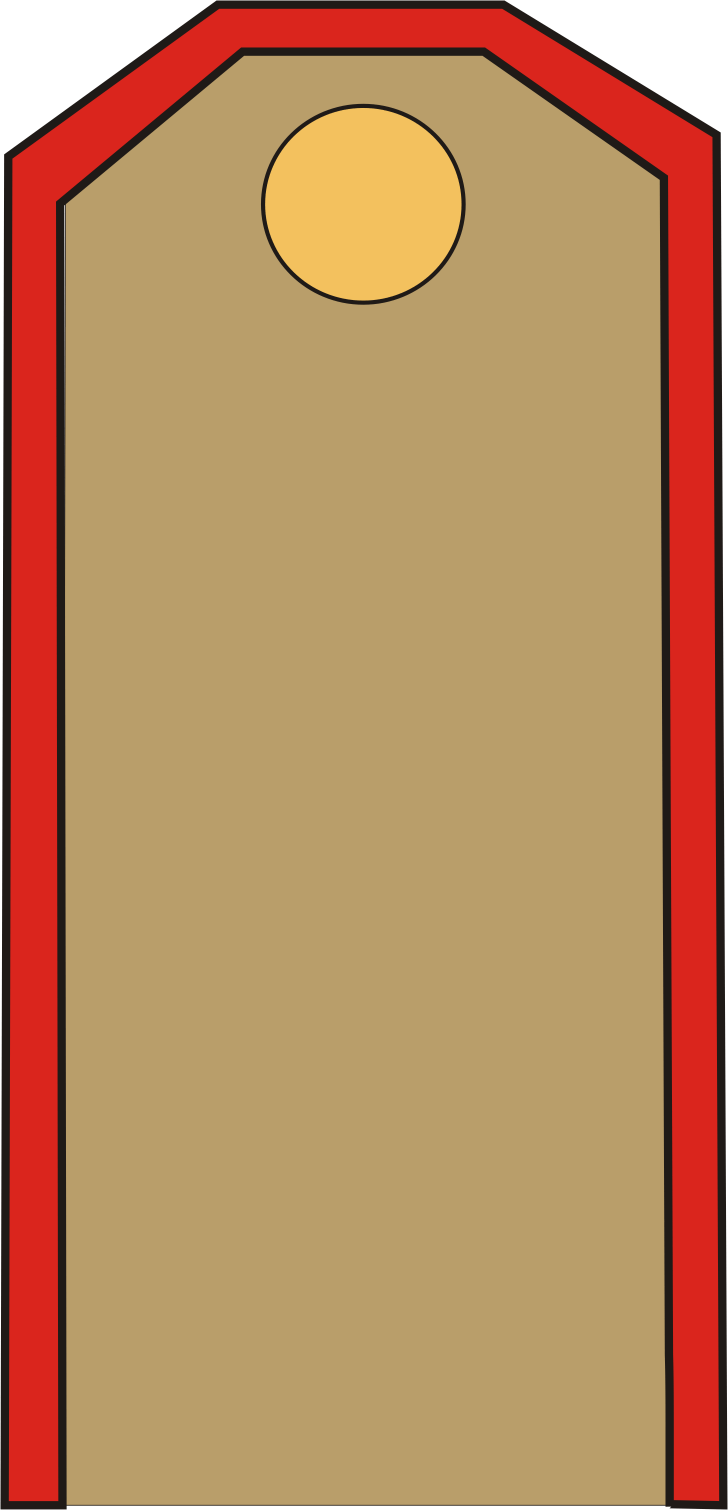
— Ryadovoy —
shoulder board field (1946–1955)	shoulder board Motorized Rifle Troops Army (1955–1994)	AB Troops, AF and ADF (1955–1994)

== Rank insignia armed forces of the Russian Federation (RF) ==
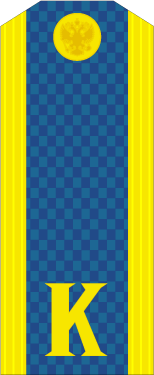
... service uniform Kursant with OR1-rank ryadovoy, of the RF AF or airborne troops (1994–2010)

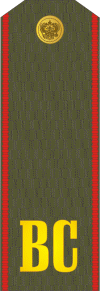
... ryadovoy
land forces and SMT
PF Army
(1994–2010)

... field service uniform ryadovoy
land forces, airborne troops, SMT, RSF
Marines,
AF, AD, etc.
(1994–2010)

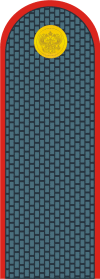
...
Ryadovoy Militsiya,
from 2011–present
ryadovoy of the police
Ministry of Internal Affairs (Russia).

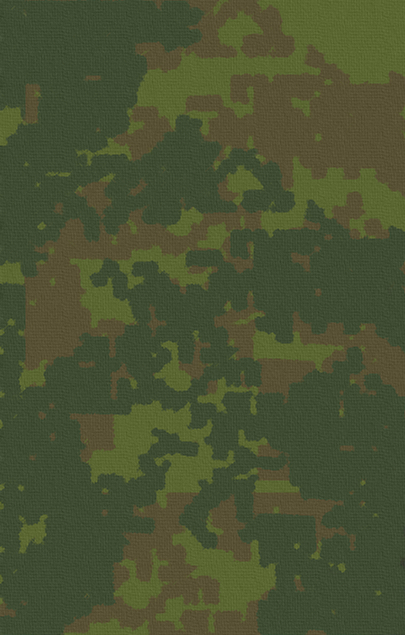
field uniform

== Rank designation in other countries ==
In the countries below, spelling is similar and the classification to a separate rank group is equivalent.

- (Belarus) ⇒ Belarusian: Радавы; rjadavy
- (Bulgaria) ⇒ Bulgarian: Редник; rednik

== See also ==
- Ranks and rank insignia of the Soviet Army 1943–1955, ... 1955–1991
- Ranks and rank insignia of the Russian Federation´s armed forces 1994–2010
- Army ranks and insignia of the Russian Federation
