= Junior sergeant =

Rank of several Eastern European armed forces

A junior sergeant is a military rank used in multiple militaries across the world. It is usually placed below sergeant.

== Russia ==
Mladshy serzhant Младший сержант
- Army shoulder and air force sleeve insignia
- Country: Russia
- Service branch: Russian Ground Forces; Russian Air Force; Russian Airborne Forces
- Rank: Non-commissioned officer
- Formation: 1940
- Next higher rank: Serzhant
- Next lower rank: Yefreytor
- Equivalent ranks: Starshina 2nd class

Junior sergeant (Russian: Младший сержант, romanized: Mladshy serzhant) is the designation to the lowest rank in the non-commissioned officer's career group in the Army, Airborne Troops, Naval Infantry and Air Force of the Russian Federation. The rank is equivalent to Starshina 2nd class in Navy.

The rank was introduced in the Red Army in 1940.

== Insignia of junior sergeants ==
Subsargento
(Angolan Army)

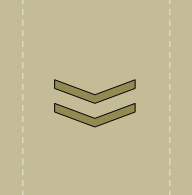
ԿՐՏՍԵՐ ՍԵՐԺԱՆՏ
Krtser Serzhant
(Armenian Ground Forces)

Kiçik çavuş
(Azerbaijani Land Forces)

Малодшы сяржант
Malodšy siaržant
(Belarusian Ground Forces)

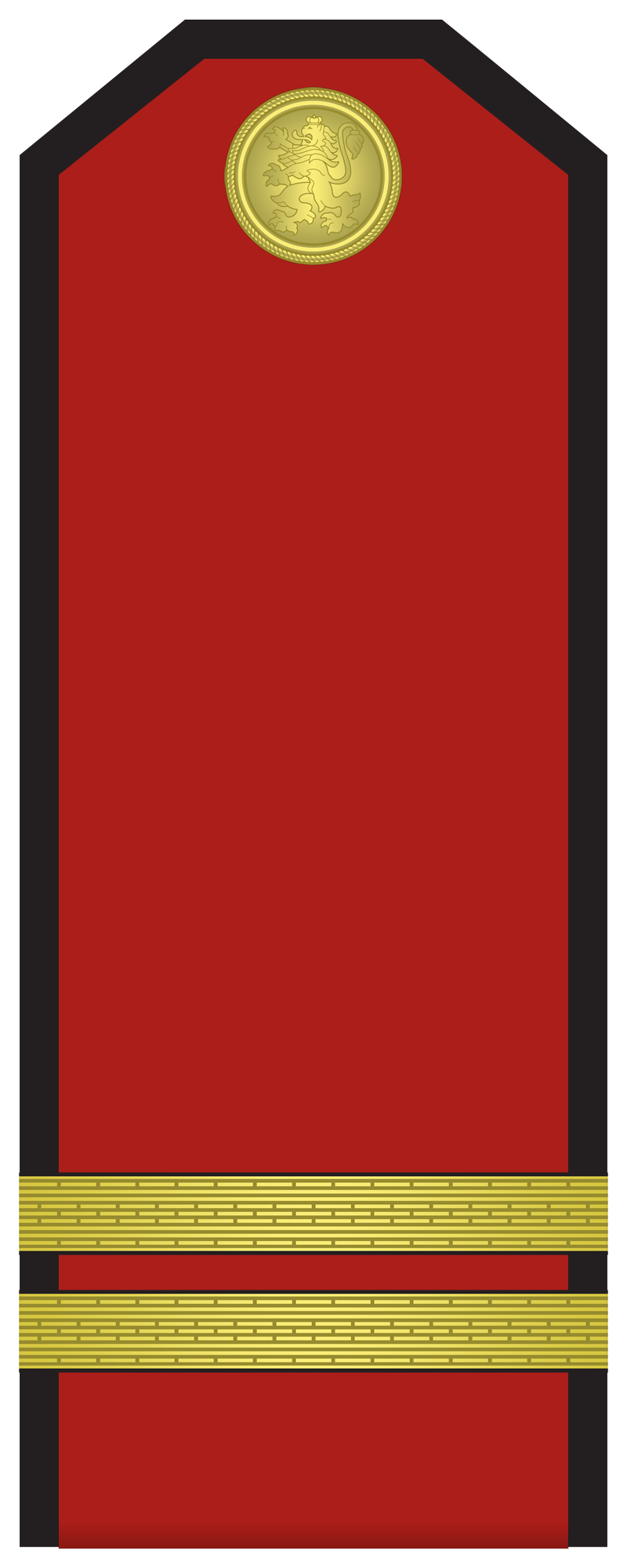
Младши сержант
Mladshi serzhant
(Bulgarian Land Forces)

Subsargento
(Salvadoran Army)

Nooremseersant
(Estonian Ground Forces)

Finnish: Alikersantti
(Swedish: Undersergeant)
(Finnish Army)

უმცროსი სერჟანტი
Umtsrosi serzhant’i
(Georgian Land Forces)

Кіші сержант
Kişi serjant
(Kazakh Ground Forces)

Кенже сержант
Kenje serjant
(Kyrgyz Army)

Помлад водник
Pomlad vodnik
(North Macedonian Ground Forces)

Mlađi vodnik
(Montenegrin Ground Army)

Мла́дший сержа́нт
Mládshiy serzhánt
(Russian Ground Forces)

Млађи водник
Mlađi vodnik
(Serbian Army)

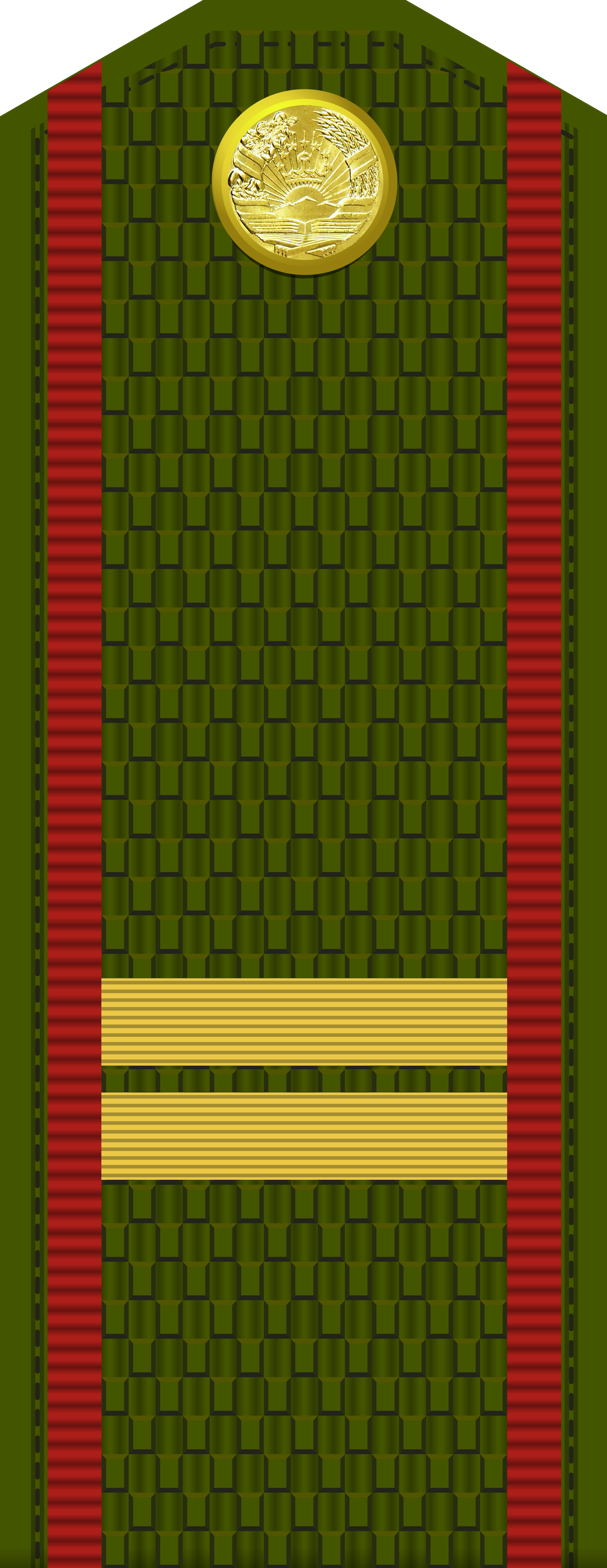
Сержанти хурд
Serƶanti xurd
(Tajik Ground Forces)

Kiçi seržant
(Turkmen Ground Forces)

Молодший сержант
Molodshyy serzhant
(Ukrainian Ground Forces)

Kichik serjant
(Uzbek Ground Forces)

== See also ==
- Sergeant
