= Comparative air force enlisted ranks of Hispanophone countries =

Rank comparison chart of Non-commissioned officer and enlisted ranks for air forces of Hispanophone states.

== Other ranks ==
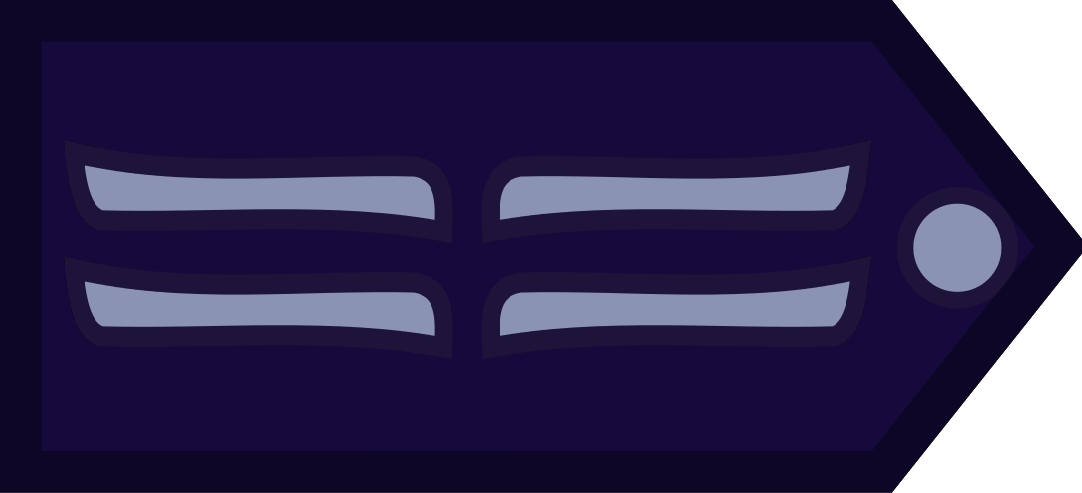
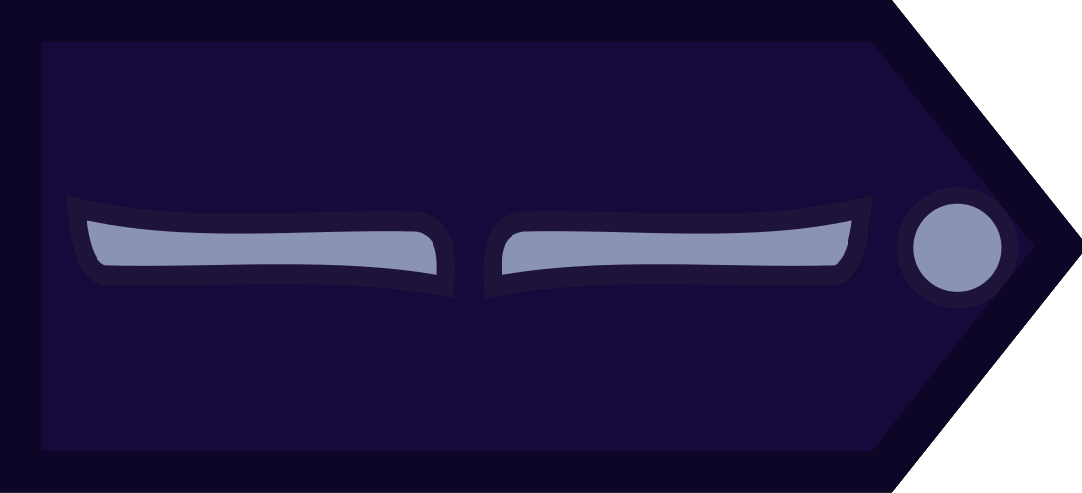
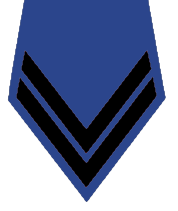
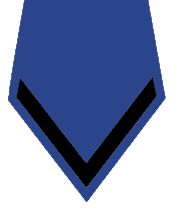
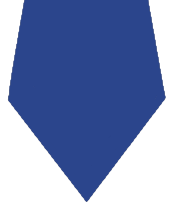
Rank group	Senior NCOs									Junior NCOs			Enlisted
Argentine Air Force
Argentine Air Force	Suboficial mayor			Suboficial principal		Suboficial ayudante	Suboficial auxiliar		Cabo principal	Cabo primero	Cabo		Voluntario primero	Voluntario segundo
Bolivian Air Force
Bolivian Air Force	Sub-oficial maestre	Sub-oficial mayor	Sub-oficial primero	Sub-oficial segundo		Sub-oficial inicial	Sergento primero		Sargento segundo	Sargento inicial	Cabo		Dragoneante	Soldado raso
Chilean Air Force													No insignia
Chilean Air Force	Suboficial mayor			Suboficial		Sargento primero			Sargento segundo	Cabo primero	Cabo segundo	Cabo	Soldado de tropa profesional	Alumno
Colombian Aerospace Force
Colombian Aerospace Force	Técnico jefe de comando conjunto		Técnico jefe de comando	Técnico jefe		Técnico subjefe	Técnico primero		Técnico segundo	Técnico tercero	Técnico cuarto		Aerotécnico
Costa Rica	No air force
Cuban Air and Air Defense Force														No insignia
Cuban Air and Air Defense Force	Mayor suboficial	Primer suboficial	Segundo suboficial	Suboficial		Sargento de primera	Sargento de segunda		Sargento de tercera		Cabo			Soldado
Dominican Air Force
Dominican Air Force				Sargento mayor		Sargento primero	Sargento A/C		Sargento		Cabo		Rasa de primera clase
Ecuadorian Air Force
Ecuadorian Air Force	Sub-oficial mayor		Sub-oficial primero	Sub-oficial segundo		Sargento primero			Sargento segundo	Cabo primero	Cabo segundo			Soldado
Salvadoran Air Force														No insignia
Salvadoran Air Force	Sargento mayor de aviación	Sargento mayor de brigada	Sargento mayor primero	Sargento mayor		Sargento primero	Sargento		Subsargento		Cabo			Soldado
Equatorial Guinea Air Force
Equatorial Guinea Air Force				Brigada		Sargento primero	Sarjento			Cabo primero	Cabo			Soldado
Guatemalan Air Force														No insignia
Guatemalan Air Force	Sargento mayor			Sargento técnico		Sargento primero			Sargento segundo		Cabo		Soldado de primera	Soldado
Honduran Air Force
Honduran Air Force				Sargento mayor técnico		Sargento primero técnico	Sargento segundo técnico				Cabo técnico		Aero técnico primera clase	Aero técnico básico
Rank group	Senior NCOs									Junior NCOs			Enlisted
Mexican Air Force
Mexican Air Force						Sargento primero			Sargento segundo		Cabo			Soldado
Nicaraguan Air Force														No insignia
Nicaraguan Air Force	Suboficial primero		Suboficial segundo	Suboficial		Sargento primero	Sargento segundo		Sargento tercero				Soldado de primera	Soldado
Panama	No air force
(Paraguay) Paraguayan Air Force
(Paraguay) Paraguayan Air Force	Sub-oficial principal		Sub-oficial mayor	Sub-oficial	Sargento ayudante	Sargento primero	Vice sargento primero		Sargento segundo	Cabo primero	Cabo segundo			Soldado
Peruvian Air Force
Peruvian Air Force	Suboficial primero		Suboficial segundo	Suboficial tercero		Sargento primero	Sargento segundo				Cabo			Avionero
Spanish Air and Space Force
Spanish Air and Space Force	Suboficial mayor		Subteniente	Brigada		Sargento primero	Sargento		Cabo mayor	Cabo primero	Cabo		Soldado de primera	Soldado
Uruguayan Air Force														No insignia
Uruguayan Air Force	Suboficial mayor/ Supervisor aerotécnica					Sargento de primera/ Instructor aerotécnico	Sargento/ Aerotécnico principal			Cabo de primera/ Aerotécnico de primera	Cabo de segunda/ Aerotécnico de segunda			Soldado de primera/ Aerotécnico de tercera	Aprendiz
Venezuelan Air Force														No insignia
Venezuelan Air Force	Sargento supervisor		Sargento ayudante	Sargento mayor de primera		Sargento mayor de segunda	Sargento mayor de tercera	Sargento primero	Sargento segundo	Cabo primero	Cabo segundo		Distinguido	Aviador
Rank group	Senior NCOs									Junior NCOs			Enlisted

== See also ==
- Comparative air force enlisted ranks of the Americas
- Ranks and insignia of NATO air forces enlisted
