= Comparative air force officer ranks of the Commonwealth =

Rank comparison chart of air forces of Commonwealth of Nations states.

== Officers ==
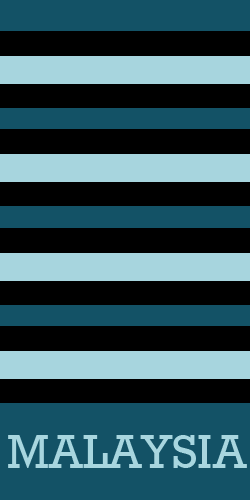
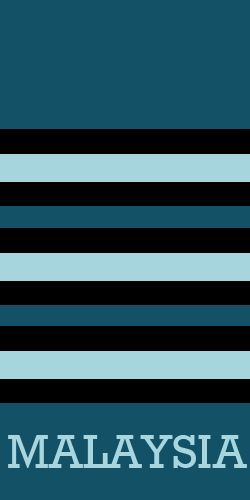
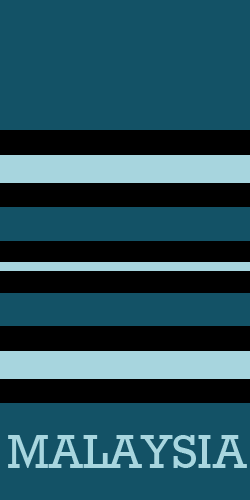
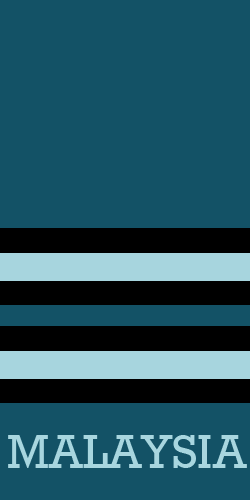
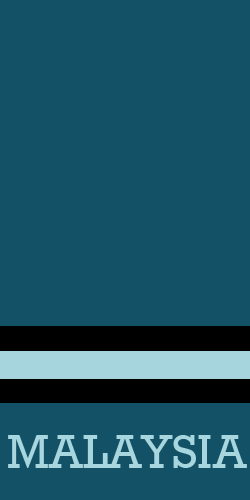
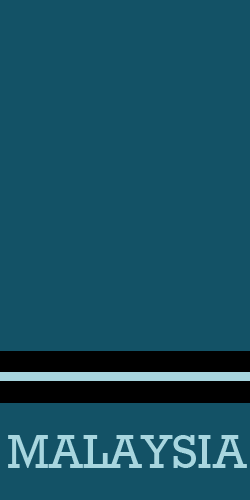
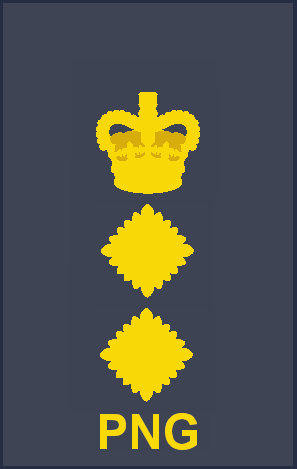
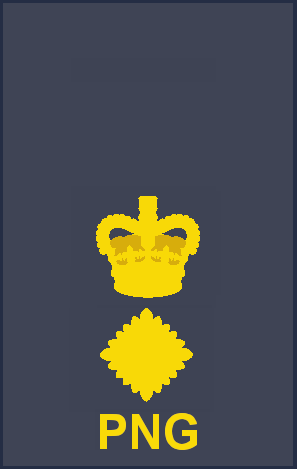
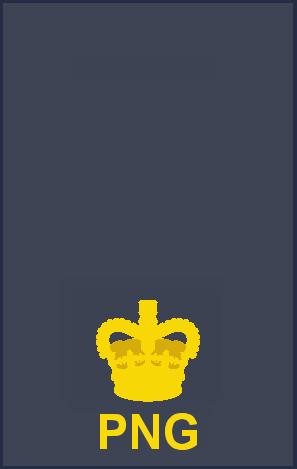
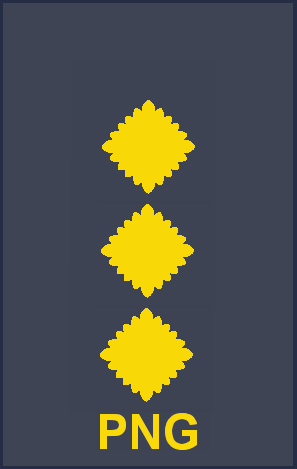
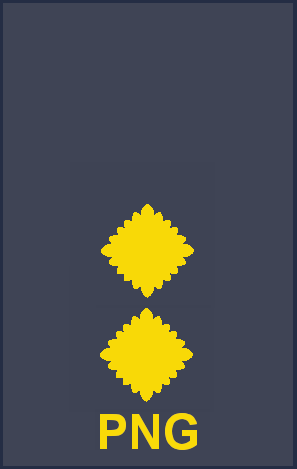
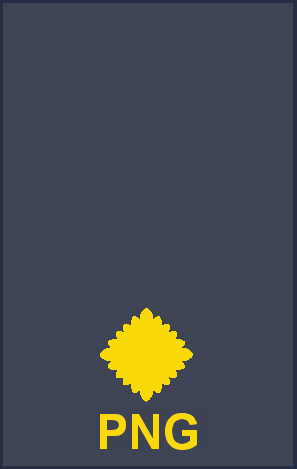
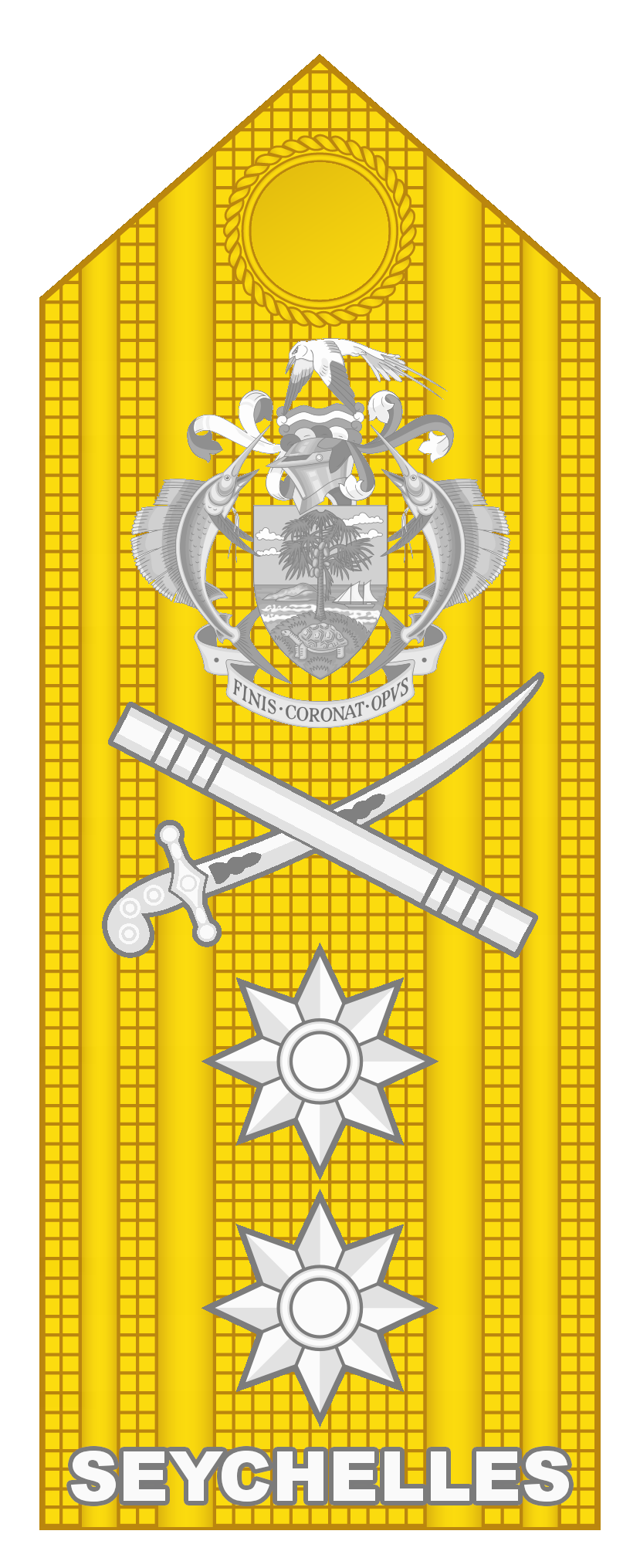
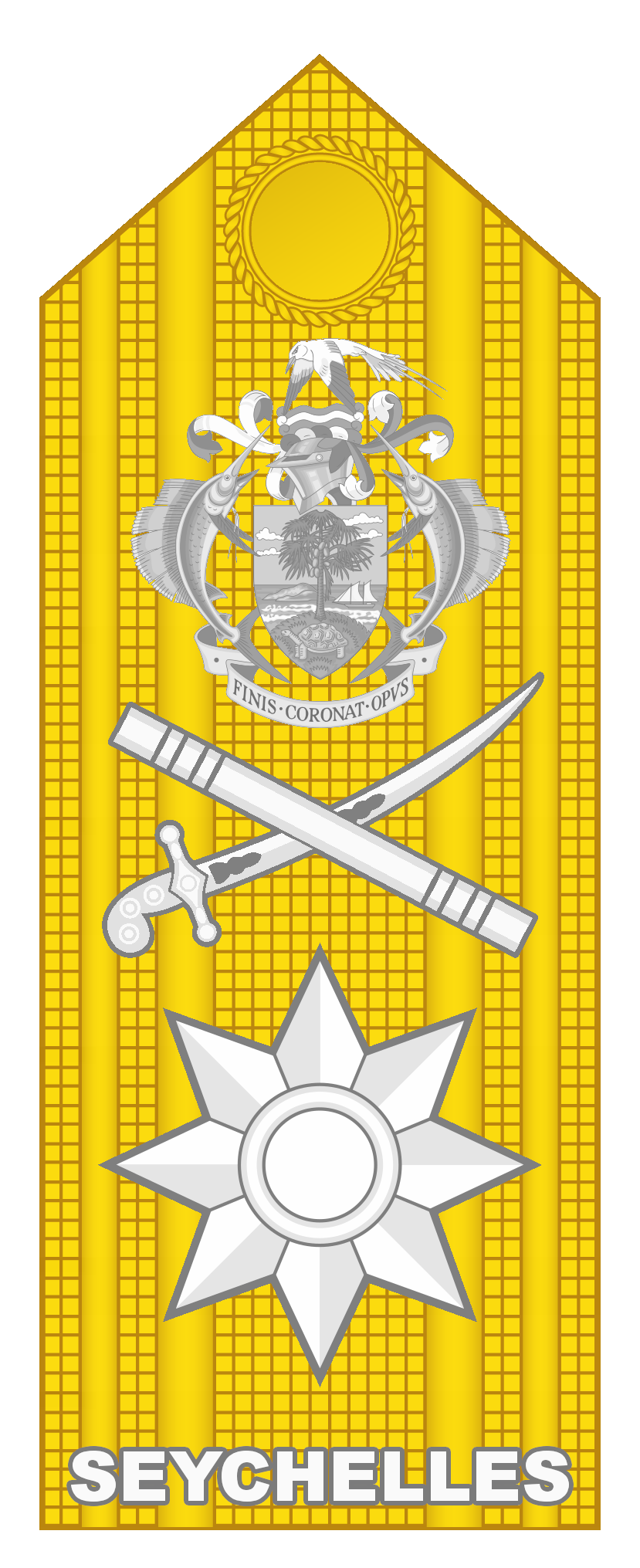
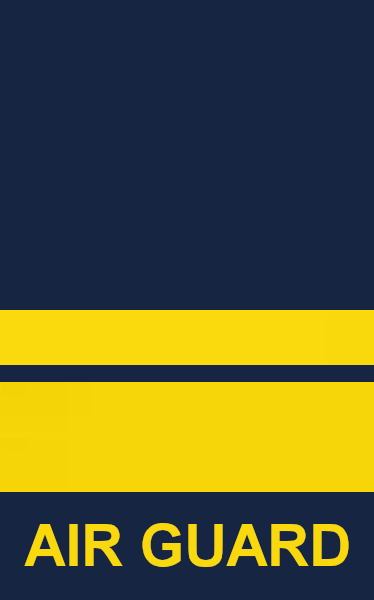
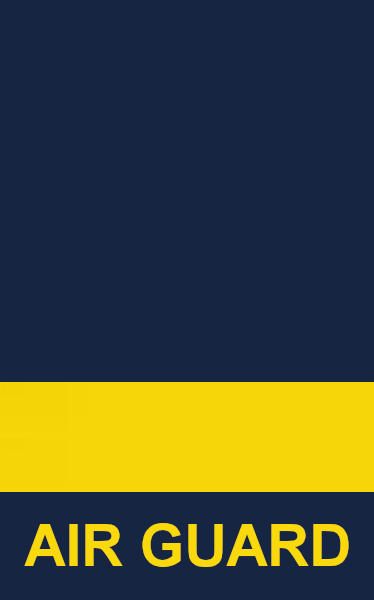
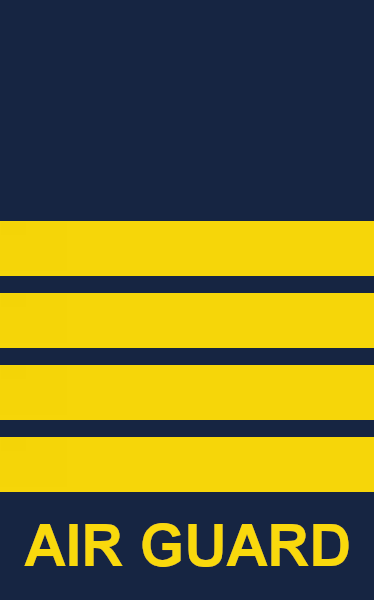
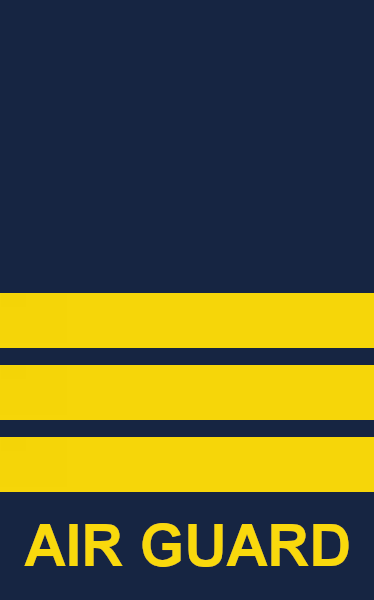
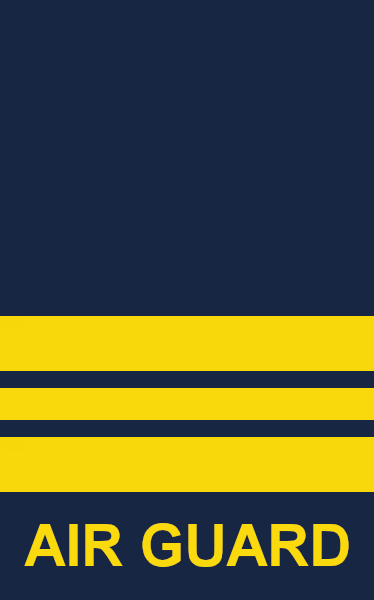
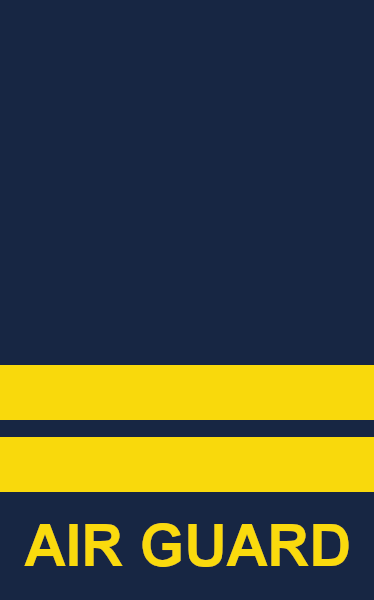
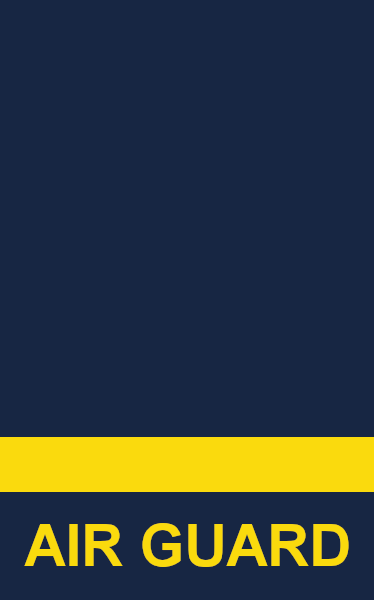
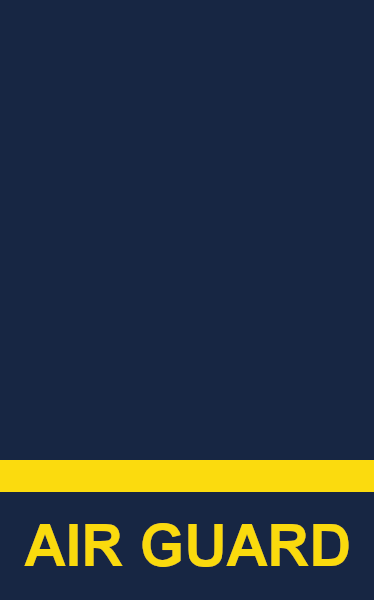
Rank group	General / flag officers					Senior officers					Junior officers
Antigua and Barbuda	No air force
Royal Australian Air Force
Royal Australian Air Force	Marshal of the RAAF	Air chief marshal	Air marshal	Air vice-marshal	Air commodore	Group captain		Wing commander		Squadron leader	Flight lieutenant	Flying officer	Pilot officer
(The Bahamas) Bahamas	No air force
Bangladesh Air Force
Bangladesh Air Force		এয়ার চিফ মার্শাল; Ēẏār chiph mārśāl	এয়ার মার্শাল; Ēẏār mārśāl	এয়ার ভাইস মার্শাল; Ēẏār bhā'is mārśāl	এয়ার কমোডোর; Ēẏār kômōḍōr	গ্রুপ ক্যাপ্টেন; Grup kaepṭēn		উইং কমান্ডার; U'iṁ kômānḍār		স্কোয়াড্রন লীডার; Skōẏāḍran līḍār	ফ্লাইট লেফটেন্যান্ট; Phlā'iṭ lēphṭēnānṭ	ফ্লাইং অফিসার; Phlā'iṁ ôphisār	পাইলট অফিসার; Pā'ilôṭ Ôphisār
Barbados	No air force
Belize Defence Force Air Wing
Belize Defence Force Air Wing										Major	Captain	Lieutenant	Second lieutenant
Botswana Defence Force Air Wing
Botswana Defence Force Air Wing				Major general	Brigadier	Colonel		Lieutenant colonel		Major	Captain	First lieutenant	Second lieutenant
Royal Brunei Air Force
Royal Brunei Air Force	Marsyal udara	Jeneral (udara)	Leftenan jeneral (udara)	Mejar jeneral (udara)	Brigedier jeneral (udara)	Kolonel (udara)		Leftenan kolonel (udara)		Mejar (udara)	Kapten (udara)	Leftenan (udara)	Leftenan muda (udara)
Cameroon Air Force
Cameroon Air Force		Général d'armée aérienne	Général de corps aérien	Général de division aérienne	Général de brigade aérienne	Colonel		Lieutenant-Colonel		Commandant	Capitaine	Lieutenant	Sous-Lieutenant
Royal Canadian Air Force
Royal Canadian Air Force		General	Lieutenant-general	Major-general	Brigadier-general	Colonel		Lieutenant-colonel		Major	Captain	Lieutenant	Second lieutenant
Royal Canadian Air Force		Général(e)	Lieutenant(e)-général(e)	Major(e)-général(e)	Brigadier(ère)-général(e)	Colonel(le)		Lieutenant(e)-colonel(le)		Major(e)	Capitaine	Lieutenant(e)	Sous-lieutenant(e)
Cyprus Air Forces
Cyprus Air Forces			Αντιπτέραρχος; Antipterarchos	Υποπτέραρχος; Ypopterarchos	Ταξίαρχος; Taxiarchos	Σμήναρχος; Sminarchos		Αντισμήναρχος; Antisminarchos		Επισμηναγός; Episminagos	Σμηναγός; Sminagos	Υποσμηναγός; Yposminagos	Ανθυποσμηναγός; Anthyposminagos
Dominica	No air force
Fiji	No air force
Gabonese Air Force
Gabonese Air Force		Général d'armée	Général de corps d'armée	Général de division	Général de brigade	Colonel		Lieutenant-colonel		Commandant	Capitaine	Lieutenant	Sous-Lieutenant
Ghana Air Force
Ghana Air Force		Air chief marshal	Air marshal	Air vice-marshal	Air commodore	Group captain		Wing commander		Squadron leader	Flight lieutenant	Flying officer	Pilot officer
Grenada	No air force <
Guyana Air Corps
Guyana Air Corps								Lieutenant Colonel		Major	Captain	Lieutenant	Second lieutenant
Indian Air Force
Indian Air Force	Marshal of the Indian Air Force मार्शल ऑफ द इंडियन एयरफोर्स	Air chief marshal एयर चीफ मार्शल	Air marshal एयर मार्शल	Air vice marshal एयर वाइस मार्शल	Air commodore एयर कमोडोर	Group captain ग्रुप कैप्टन		Wing commander विंग कमांडर		Squadron leader स्क्वाड्रन लीडर	Flight lieutenant फ्लाइट लैफ्टिनेंट	Flying officer फ्लाइंग अफसर
Rank group	General / flag officers					Senior officers					Junior officers
Jamaican Air Wing
Jamaican Air Wing								Lieutenant colonel		Major	Captain	First lieutenant	Second lieutenant
Kenya Air Force
Kenya Air Force	Commander-in-Chief	General	Lieutenant general	Major general	Brigadier	Colonel		Lieutenant colonel		Major	Captain	Lieutenant	Second lieutenant
Kiribati	No air force
Lesotho Air Squadron
Lesotho Air Squadron			Lieutenant general	Major general	Brigadier	Colonel		Lieutenant colonel		Major	Captain	First lieutenant	Second lieutenant
Malawi Air Force
Malawi Air Force		General	Lieutenant general	Major general	Brigadier general	Colonel		Lieutenant colonel		Major	Captain	First lieutenant	Second lieutenant
Royal Malaysian Air Force
Royal Malaysian Air Force	Marsyal tentera udara	Jeneral TUDM	Leftenan jeneral TUDM	Mejar jeneral TUDM	Brigedier jeneral TUDM	Kolonel TUDM		Leftenan kolonel TUDM		Mejar TUDM	Kapten TUDM	Leftenan TUDM	Leftenan muda TUDM
Mauritius	No air force
Mozambique Air Force
Mozambique Air Force		Coronel General	Tenente General	Major General		Coronel		Tenente Coronel		Major	Capitão	Tenente	Alferes
Namibian Air Force
Namibian Air Force		Chief air marshal	Air marshal	Air vice marshal	Air commodore	Group captain		Wing commander		Squadron leader	Flight lieutenant	Flying officer	Pilot officer
Nauru	No air force
Royal New Zealand Air Force
Royal New Zealand Air Force	Marshal of the RNZAF		Air marshal	Air vice-marshal	Air commodore	Group captain		Wing commander		Squadron leader	Flight lieutenant	Flying officer	Pilot officer
Nigerian Air Force
Nigerian Air Force	Marshal of the air force	Air chief marshal	Air marshal	Air vice-marshal	Air commodore	Group captain		Wing commander		Squadron leader	Flight lieutenant	Flying officer	Pilot officer
Pakistan Air Force
Pakistan Air Force	Marshal of the Pakistan Air Force	Air chief marshal	Air marshal	Air vice marshal	Air commodore	Group captain		Wing commander		Squadron leader	Flight lieutenant	Flying officer	Pilot officer
Pakistan Air Force	سالار فضائیہ	امیرسالار فضائیہ	سالار فضائیہ	سالار فضائیہ مقابل	عَمِيد الفضاء	سردار جماعت		شارف الجناح		قائدِ دستہ	نقیبِ پرواز	منصبِ طیار	منصبِ پائلٹ
Papua New Guinea Air Element
Papua New Guinea Air Element						Colonel		Lieutenant colonel		Major	Captain	First lieutenant	Second lieutenant
Papua New Guinea Air Element						Kolonel		Leftenan kolonel		Meja	Kepten	Leftenan	Namba tu leftenan
Rank group	General / flag officers					Senior officers					Junior officers
Rwandan Air Force
Rwandan Air Force		General	Lieutenant general	Major general	Brigadier general	Colonel		Lieutenant colonel		Major	Captain	Lieutenant	Second lieutenant
Saint Kitts and Nevis	No air force
Saint Lucia	No air force
Saint Vincent and the Grenadines	No air force
Samoa	No air force
Seychelles Air Force
Seychelles Air Force				Major general (Note: Introduced December 2024)	Brigadier general	Colonel		Lieutenant colonel		Major	Captain	Lieutenant	Second lieutenant
Sierra Leone	No air force
Republic of Singapore Air Force		No insignia yet
Republic of Singapore Air Force		General	Lieutenant general	Major general	Brigadier general	Colonel		Senior lieutenant colonel	Lieutenant colonel	Major	Captain	Lieutenant	Second lieutenant
Solomon Islands	No air force
South African Air Force
South African Air Force		General	Lieutenant general	Major general	Brigadier general	Colonel		Lieutenant colonel		Major	Captain	Lieutenant	Second lieutenant
Sri Lanka Air Force
Sri Lanka Air Force	Marshal of the Air Force	Air chief marshal	Air marshal	Air vice-marshal	Air commodore	Group captain		Wing commander		Squadron leader	Flight lieutenant	Flying officer	Pilot officer
(Eswatini) Swaziland	No air force
Tanzania Air Force
Tanzania Air Force		Jenerali	Luteni jenerali	Meja jenerali	Brigedia jenerali	Kanali		Luteni kanali		Meja	Kapteni	Luteni	Luteni usu
(Togo) Togolese Air Force
(Togo) Togolese Air Force				Général de division aérienne	Général de brigade aérienne	Colonel-major	Colonel	Lieutenant-colonel		Commandant	Capitaine	Lieutenant	Sous-lieutenant
Trinidad and Tobago Air Guard
Trinidad and Tobago Air Guard				Air vice marshal	Air commodore	Group captain		Wing commander		Squadron leader	Flight lieutenant	Flying officer	Pilot officer
Tuvalu	No air force
Ugandan Air Force
Ugandan Air Force		General	Lieutenant general	Major general	Brigadier	Colonel		Lieutenant colonel		Major	Captain	Lieutenant	Second lieutenant
Royal Air Force
Royal Air Force	Marshal of the RAF	Air chief marshal	Air marshal	Air vice-marshal	Air commodore	Group captain		Wing commander		Squadron leader	Flight lieutenant	Flying officer	Pilot officer /acting pilot officer
Vanuatu	No air force
Zambian Air Force
Zambian Air Force		General	Lieutenant general	Major general	Brigadier	Colonel		Lieutenant colonel		Major	Captain	Lieutenant	Second lieutenant
Rank group	General / flag officers					Senior officers					Junior officers

== See also ==
- Comparative air force enlisted ranks of the Commonwealth
- Comparative air force officer ranks of the Americas
- Ranks and insignia of NATO air forces officers
