= Comparative air force officer ranks of Hispanophone countries =

Rank comparison chart of officers for air forces of Hispanophone states.

== Officers ==
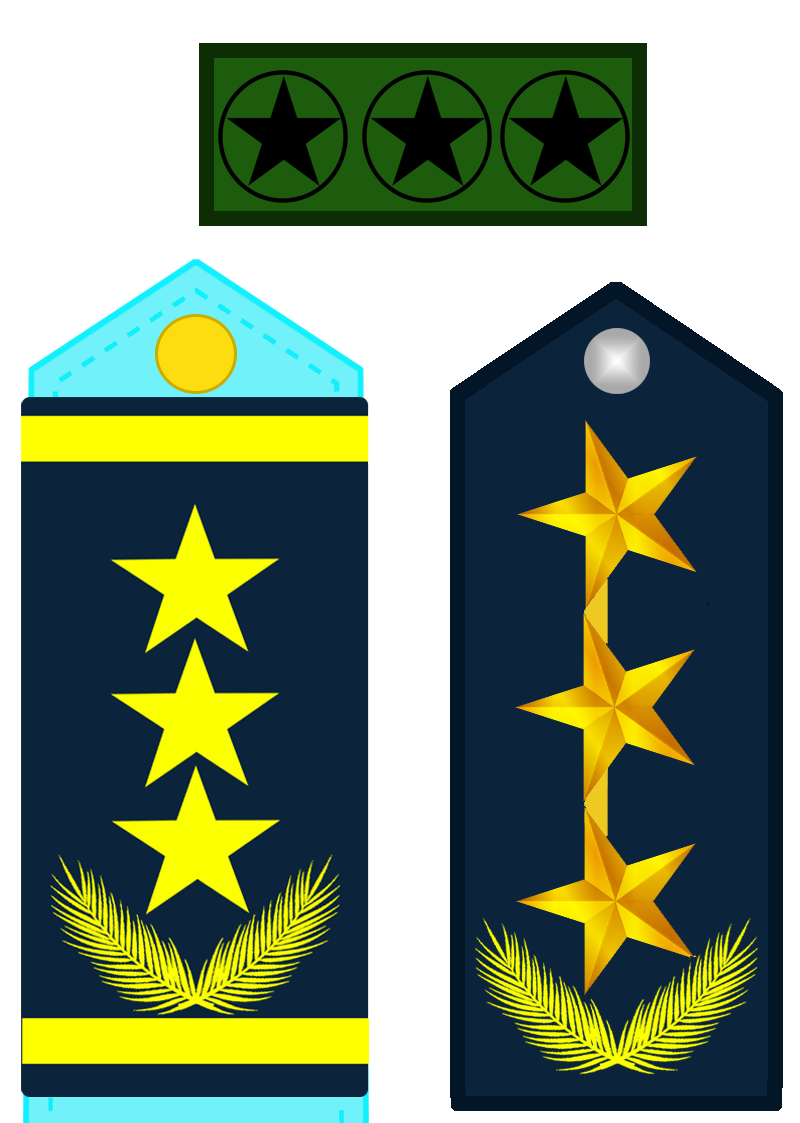
| Rank group | General / flag officers | | | | | Senior officers | | | | Junior officers |
|---|---|---|---|---|---|---|---|---|---|---|---|---|---|---|
| Argentine Air Force |
| Argentine Air Force | | Brigadier general | Brigadier mayor | Brigadier | Comodoro mayor | Comodoro | | Vicecomodoro | Mayor | Capitán | | Primer teniente | Teniente | Alférez |
| Bolivian Air Force |
| Bolivian Air Force | | General de fuerza aeréa | General de división aeréa | General de brigada aeréa | | Coronel aviador | | Teniente coronel aviador | Mayor aviador | Captáin aviador | | Teniente aviador | | Subteniente aviador |
| Chilean Air Force |
| Chilean Air Force | | General de aire | General de aviación | General de brigada aérea | Comodoro | Coronel de aviación | | Comandante de grupo | Comandante de escuadrilla | Capitán de bandada | | Teniente | Subteniente | Alférez |
| Colombian Aerospace Force |
| Colombian Aerospace Force | | General del aire | | Mayor general del aire | Brigadier general del aire | Coronel | | Teniente coronel | Mayor | Capitán | | Teniente | | Subteniente |
| Costa Rica | No air force |
| Cuban Air and Air Defense Force |
| Cuban Air and Air Defense Force | | General del Aire | General de cuerpo de ejército | General de división | General de brigada | Primer coronel | Coronel | Teniente coronel | Mayor | Capitán | | Primer teniente | Teniente | Subteniente |
| Dominican Air Force |
| Dominican Air Force | | | Teniente general | Mayor general | General de brigada | Coronel | | Teniente coronel | Mayor | Capitán | | Primer teniente | | Segundo teniente |
| Ecuadorian Air Force |
| Ecuadorian Air Force | | General del aire | Teniente general | Brigadier general | | Coronel | | Teniente coronel | Mayor | Capitán | | Teniente | | Subteniente |
| Salvadoran Air Force |
| Salvadoran Air Force | | General del aire | General de avación | General de brigada aérea | Brigadier | Coronel | | Teniente coronel | Mayor | Capitán | | Teniente | | Subteniente |
| Equatorial Guinea Air Force |
| Equatorial Guinea Air Force | | | | General de division | General de brigada | Coronel | | Teniente coronel | Comandante | Capitán | | Teniente | | Alférez |
| Guatemalan Air Force |
| Guatemalan Air Force | | | | General de división | General de brigada | Coronel | | Teniente coronel | Mayor | Capitán primero | Capitán segundo | Teniente | | Subteniente |
| Honduran Air Force |
| Honduran Air Force | | | | General de división | General de brigada | Coronel | | Teniente coronel | Mayor | Capitán | | Teniente | | Subteniente |
| Rank group | General / flag officers | | | | | Senior officers | | | | Junior officers |
| Mexican Air Force |
| Mexican Air Force | | | General de división | General de ala | General de grupo | Coronel | | Teniente coronel | Mayor | Capitan primero | Capitán segundo | Teniente | | Subteniente |
| Nicaraguan Air Force |
| Nicaraguan Air Force | | General de ejército | Coronel general | Mayor general | General de brigada | Coronel | | Teniente coronel | Mayor | Capitán | | Teniente primero | | Teniente |
| Panama | No air force |
| Paraguayan Air Force |
| Paraguayan Air Force | | General de fuerza aerea | General de división | General de brigada | | Coronel | | Teniente coronel | Mayor | Capitán | | Teniente primero | Teniente | Subteniente |
| Peruvian Air Force |
| Peruvian Air Force | | General del aire | Teniente general | Mayor general | | Coronel | | Comandante | Mayor | Capitán | | Teniente | | Alférez |
| Spanish Air and Space Force |
| Spanish Air and Space Force | Capitán general | General del aire | Teniente general | General de división | General de brigada | Coronel | | Teniente coronel | Comandante | Capitán | | Teniente | | Alférez |
| Uruguayan Air Force |
| Uruguayan Air Force | | General del Aire | | Brigadier general | | Coronel | | Teniente coronel | Mayor | Capitán | | Teniente primero | Teniente segundo | Alférez |
| Venezuelan Air Force |
| Venezuelan Air Force | | General en jefe | Mayor general | General de division | General de brigada | Coronel | | Teniente coronel | Mayor | Capitán | | Primer teniente | | Teniente |
| Rank group | General / flag officers | | | | | Senior officers | | | | Junior officers |

== See also ==
- Comparative air force officer ranks of the Americas
- Ranks and insignia of NATO air forces officers
