= Comparative air force enlisted ranks of the Americas =

Rank comparison chart of Non-commissioned officer and enlisted ranks for air forces of North and South American states.

== Other ranks ==
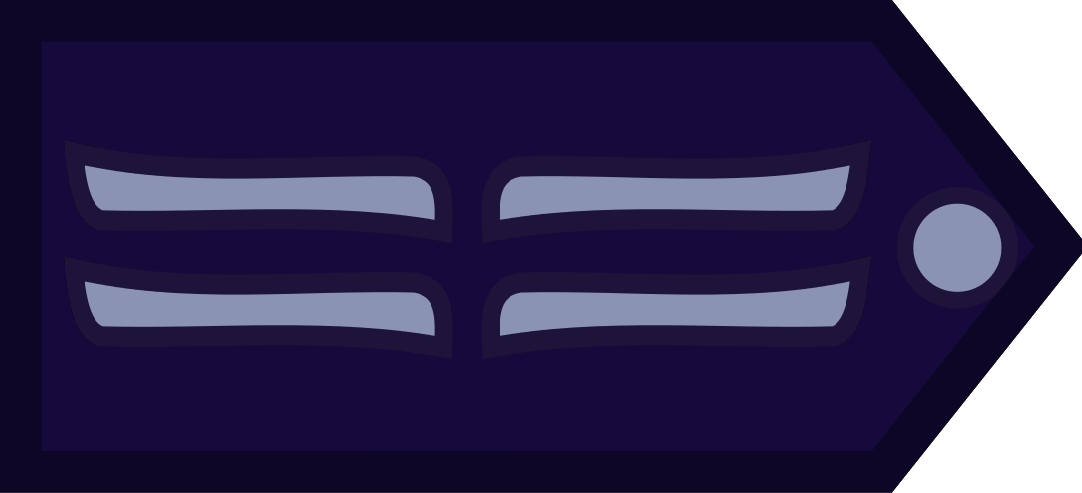
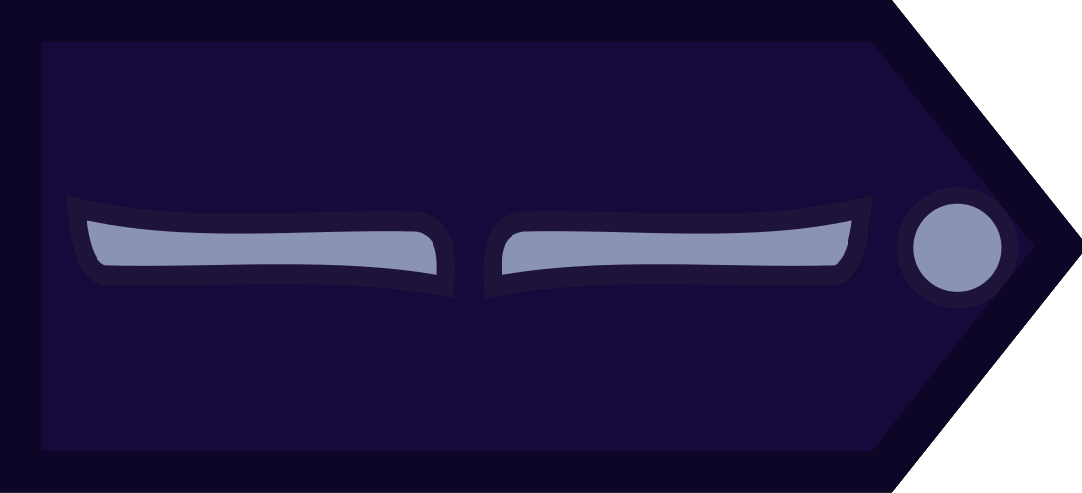
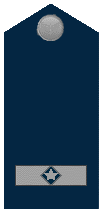
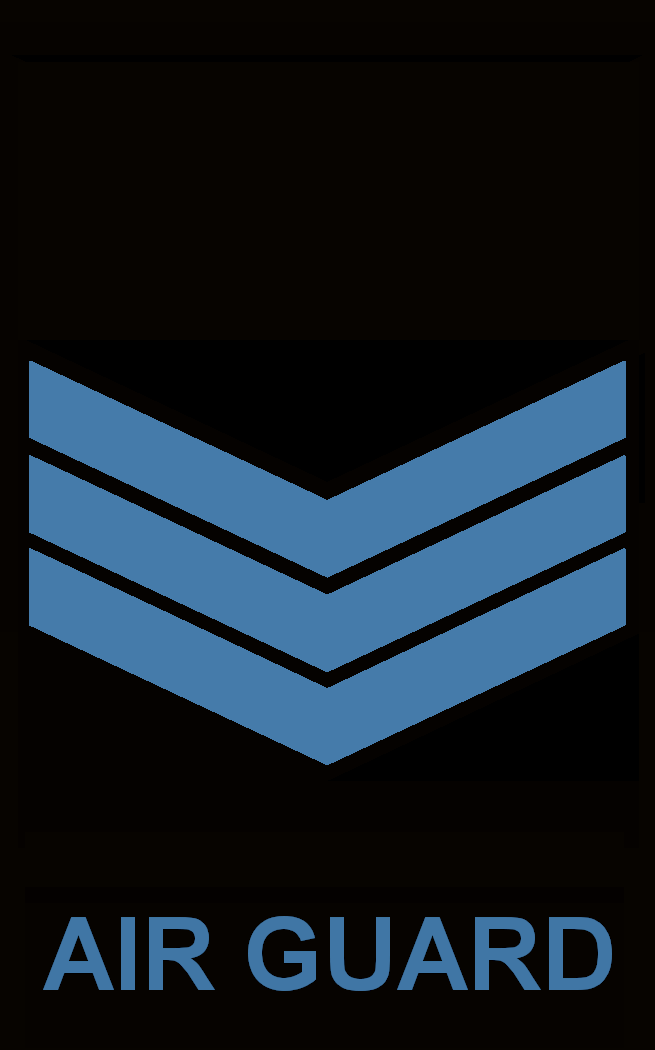
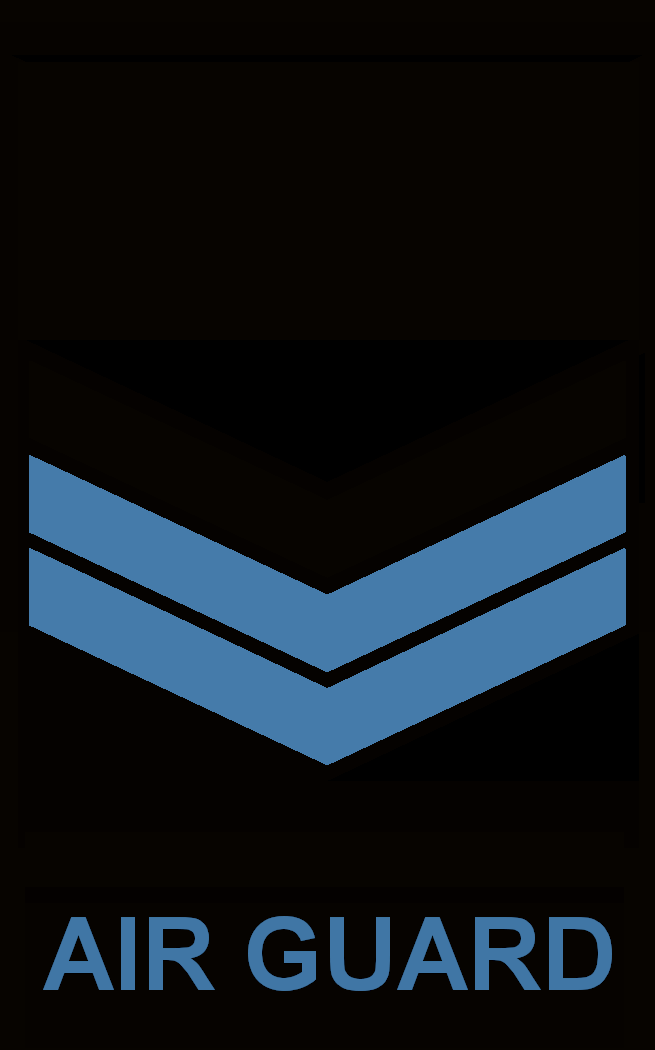
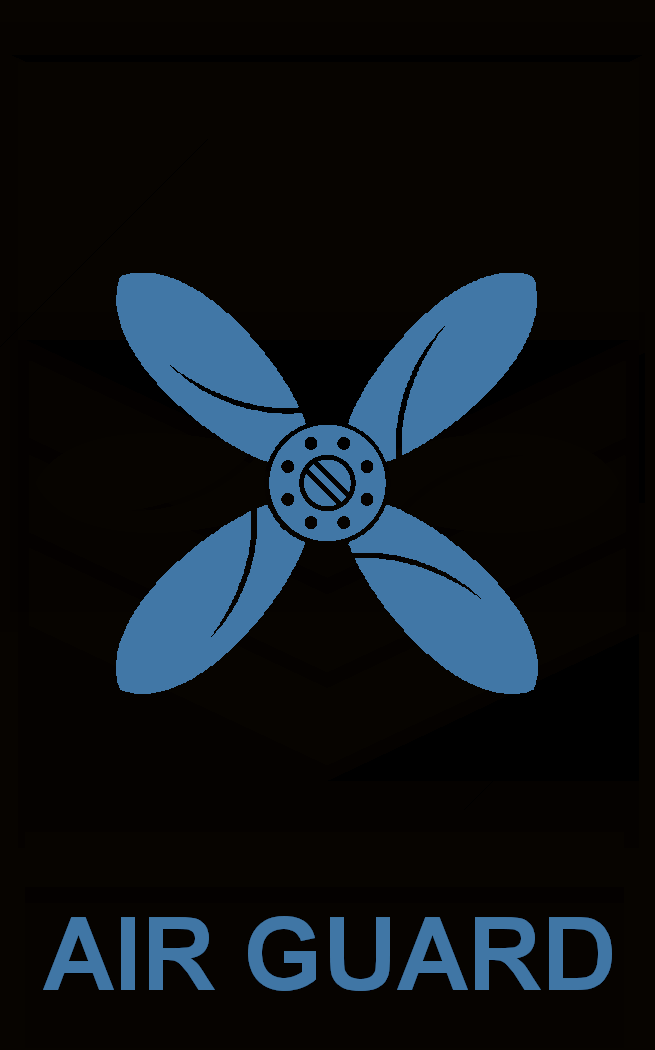
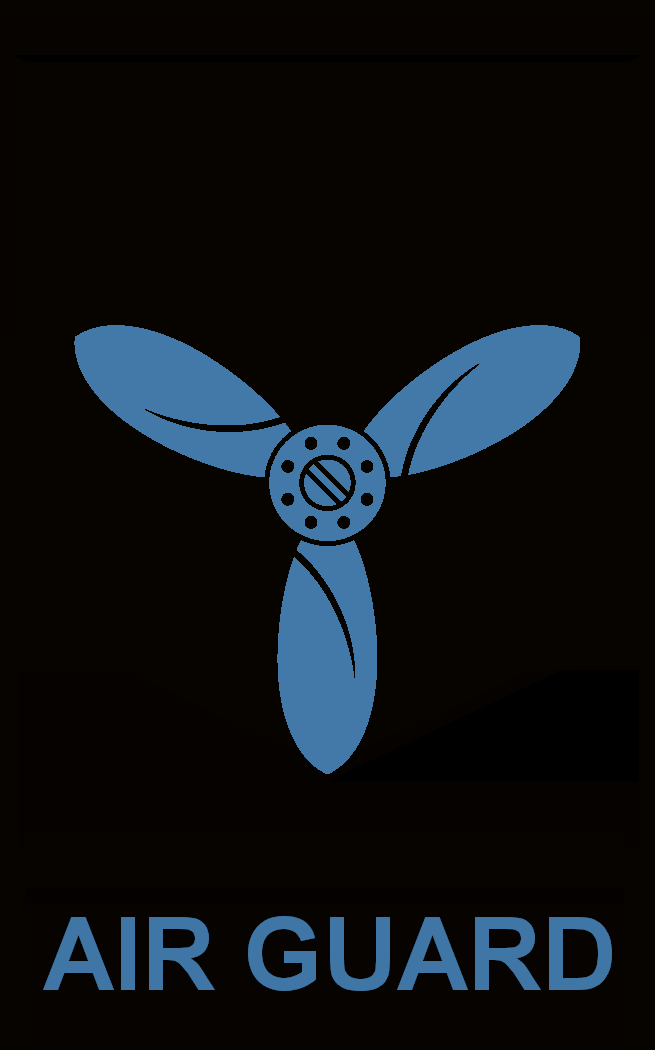
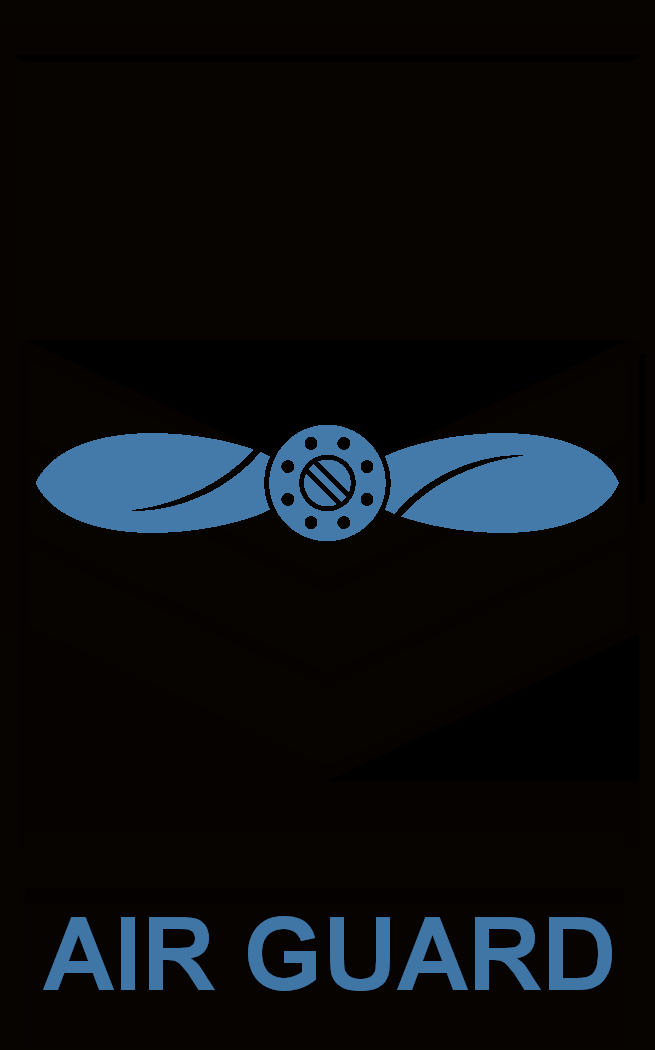
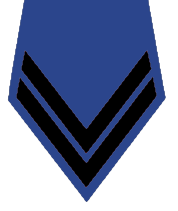
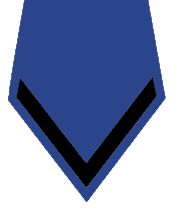
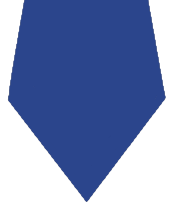
Rank group	Senior NCOs											Junior NCOs				Enlisted
Antigua and Barbuda	No air force
Argentine Air Force
Argentine Air Force	Suboficial mayor			Suboficial principal		Suboficial ayudante		Suboficial auxiliar		Cabo principal		Cabo primero		Cabo		Voluntario primero		Voluntario segundo
(The Bahamas) Bahamas	No air force
Belize Defence Force Air Wing																No insignia
Belize Defence Force Air Wing	Warrant officer class 1			Warrant officer class 2		Staff sergeant		Sergeant				Corporal		Lance corporal		Private (or equivalent)
Bolivian Air Force
Bolivian Air Force	Sub-oficial maestre	Sub-oficial mayor	Sub-oficial primero	Sub-oficial segundo		Sub-oficial inicial		Sergento primero		Sargento segundo		Sargento inicial		Cabo		Dragoneante		Soldado raso
Brazilian Air Force
Brazilian Air Force	Suboficial							Primeiro-Sargento		Segundo-Sargento	Terceiro-Sargento	Cabo	Taifeiro-mor			Soldado	Taifeiro primeira classe	Soldado segunda classe	Taifeiro segunda classe
Royal Canadian Air Force
Royal Canadian Air Force	Chief warrant officer			Master warrant officer		Warrant officer		Sergeant				Master corporal		Corporal		Aviator (trained)		Aviator (basic)
Royal Canadian Air Force	Adjudant(e)-chef			Adjudant(e)-maître		Adjudant(e)		Sergent(e)				Caporal(e)-chef		Caporal(e)		Aviateur (formé)/ Aviatrice (formée)		Aviateur (confirmé)/ Aviatrice (confirmée)
Chilean Air Force																No insignia
Chilean Air Force	Suboficial mayor			Suboficial		Sargento primero				Sargento segundo		Cabo primero		Cabo segundo	Cabo	Soldado de tropa profesional		Alumno
Colombian Aerospace Force
Colombian Aerospace Force	Técnico jefe de comando conjunto		Técnico jefe de comando	Técnico jefe		Técnico subjefe		Técnico primero		Técnico segundo		Técnico tercero		Técnico cuarto		Aerotécnico
Rank group	Senior NCOs											Junior NCOs				Enlisted
Costa Rica	No air force
Cuban Air and Air Defense Force																		No insignia
Cuban Air and Air Defense Force	Mayor suboficial	Primer suboficial	Segundo suboficial	Suboficial		Sargento de primera		Sargento de segunda		Sargento de tercera				Cabo				Soldado
Dominica	No air force
Dominican Air Force
Dominican Air Force				Sargento mayor		Sargento primero		Sargento A/C		Sargento				Cabo		Rasa de primera clase
Ecuadorian Air Force
Ecuadorian Air Force	Sub-oficial mayor		Sub-oficial primero	Sub-oficial segundo		Sargento primero				Sargento segundo		Cabo primero		Cabo segundo				Soldado
Salvadoran Air Force																		No insignia
Salvadoran Air Force	Sargento mayor de aviación	Sargento mayor de brigada	Sargento mayor primero	Sargento mayor		Sargento primero		Sargento		Subsargento				Cabo				Soldado
Grenada	No air force
Guatemalan Air Force																		No insignia
Guatemalan Air Force	Sargento mayor			Sargento técnico		Sargento primero				Sargento segundo				Cabo		Soldado de primera		Soldado
Guyana Air Corps																No insignia
Guyana Air Corps	Warrant officer class 1			Warrant officer class 2		Staff sergeant		Sergeant				Corporal		Lance corporal		Private (or equivalent)
Haitian Aviation Corps
Honduran Air Force
Honduran Air Force				Sargento mayor técnico		Sargento primero técnico		Sargento segundo técnico						Cabo técnico		Aero técnico primera clase		Aero técnico básico
Jamaican Air Wing																No insignia
Jamaican Air Wing	Warrant officer class 1			Warrant officer class 2		Staff sergeant		Sergeant				Corporal		Lance corporal		Private (or equivalent)
Mexican Air Force
Mexican Air Force						Sargento primero				Sargento segundo				Cabo				Soldado
Rank group	Senior NCOs											Junior NCOs				Enlisted
Nicaraguan Air Force																		No insignia
Nicaraguan Air Force	Suboficial primero		Suboficial segundo	Suboficial		Sargento primero		Sargento segundo		Sargento tercero						Soldado de primera		Soldado
Panama	No air force
(Paraguay) Paraguayan Air Force
(Paraguay) Paraguayan Air Force	Sub-oficial principal		Sub-oficial mayor	Sub-oficial	Sargento ayudante	Sargento primero		Vice sargento primero		Sargento segundo		Cabo primero		Cabo segundo				Soldado
Peruvian Air Force
Peruvian Air Force	Suboficial primero		Suboficial segundo	Suboficial tercero		Sargento primero		Sargento segundo						Cabo				Avionero
Saint Kitts and Nevis	No air force
Saint Lucia	No air force
Saint Vincent and the Grenadines	No air force
Trinidad and Tobago Air Guard
Trinidad and Tobago Air Guard	Warrant officer I			Warrant officer II				Sergeant				Corporal				Senior technician	Senior aircraftman	Junior aircraftman/ Junior technician
United States Air Force																		No insignia
United States Air Force	Command chief master sergeant	First sergeant	Chief master sergeant	First sergeant	Senior master sergeant	First sergeant	Master sergeant	Technical sergeant		Staff sergeant		Senior airman		Airman first class		Airman		Airman basic
United States Space Force
United States Space Force	Chief master sergeant			Senior master sergeant		Master sergeant		Technical sergeant		Sergeant		Specialist 4		Specialist 3		Specialist 2		Specialist 1
Uruguayan Air Force																		No insignia
Uruguayan Air Force	Suboficial mayor/ Supervisor aerotécnica					Sargento de primera/ Instructor aerotécnico		Sargento/ Aerotécnico principal				Cabo de primera/ Aerotécnico de primera		Cabo de segunda/ Aerotécnico de segunda				Soldado de primera/ Aerotécnico de tercera	Aprendiz
Venezuelan Air Force																		No insignia
Venezuelan Air Force	Sargento supervisor		Sargento ayudante	Sargento mayor de primera		Sargento mayor de segunda		Sargento mayor de tercera	Sargento primero	Sargento segundo		Cabo primero		Cabo segundo		Distinguido		Aviador
Rank group	Senior NCOs											Junior NCOs				Enlisted

== See also ==
- Air force officer rank insignia
- Comparative air force officer ranks of the Americas
