= Comparative air force officer ranks of the Americas =

Rank comparison chart of air forces of North and South American states.

== Officers ==
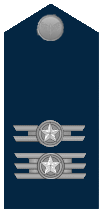
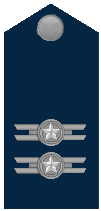
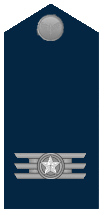
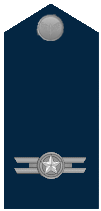
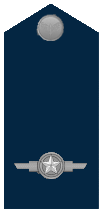
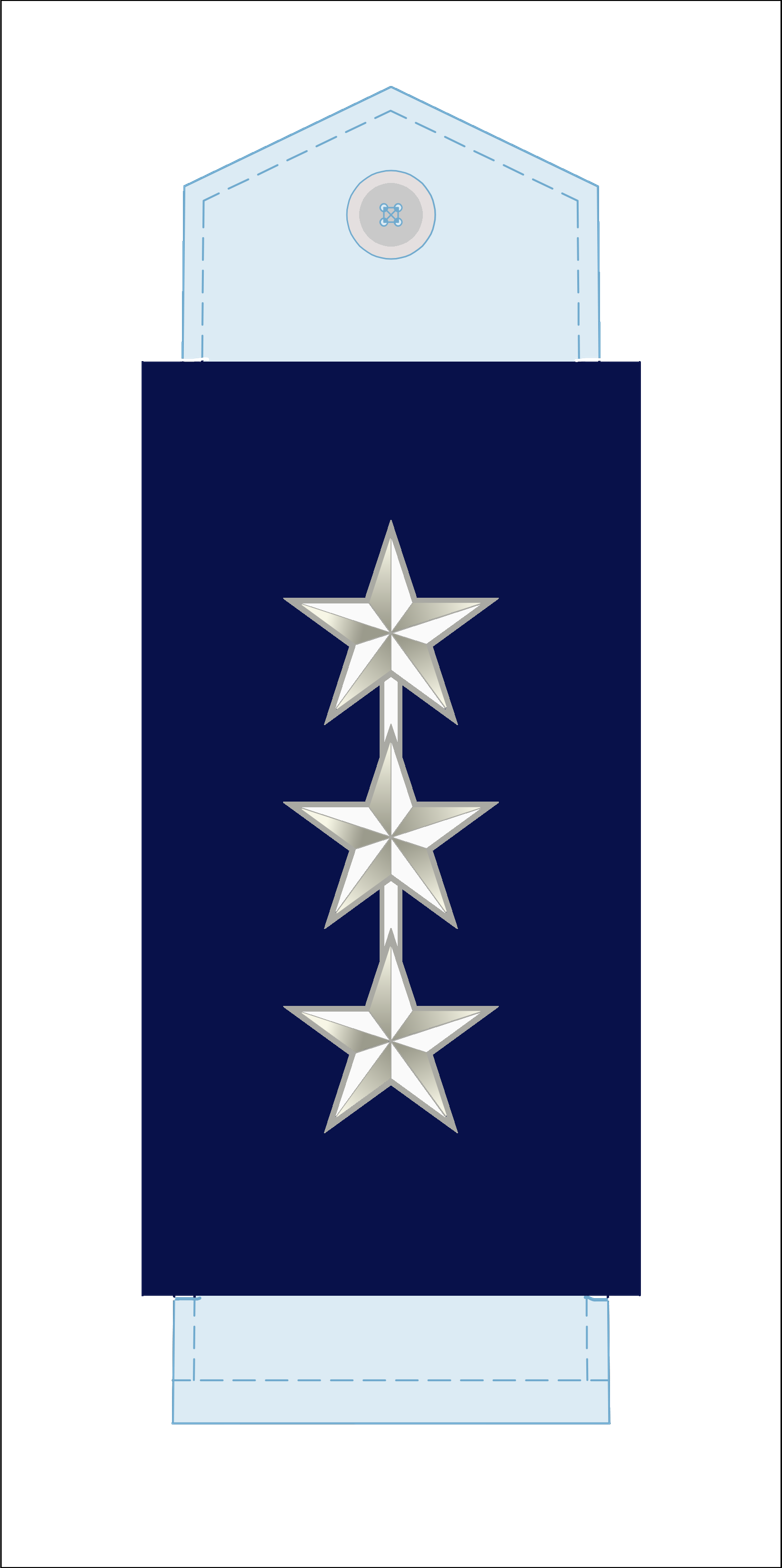
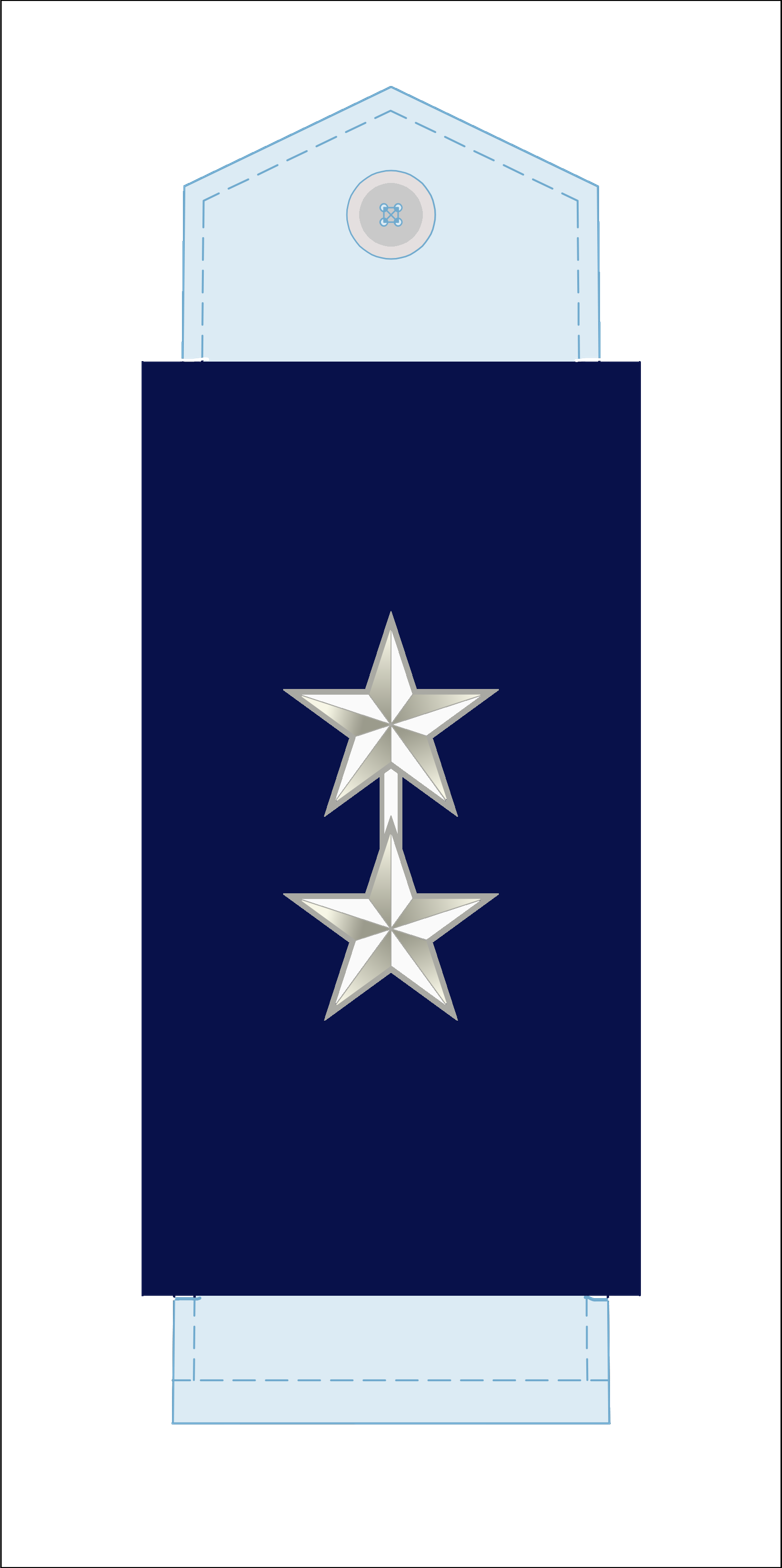
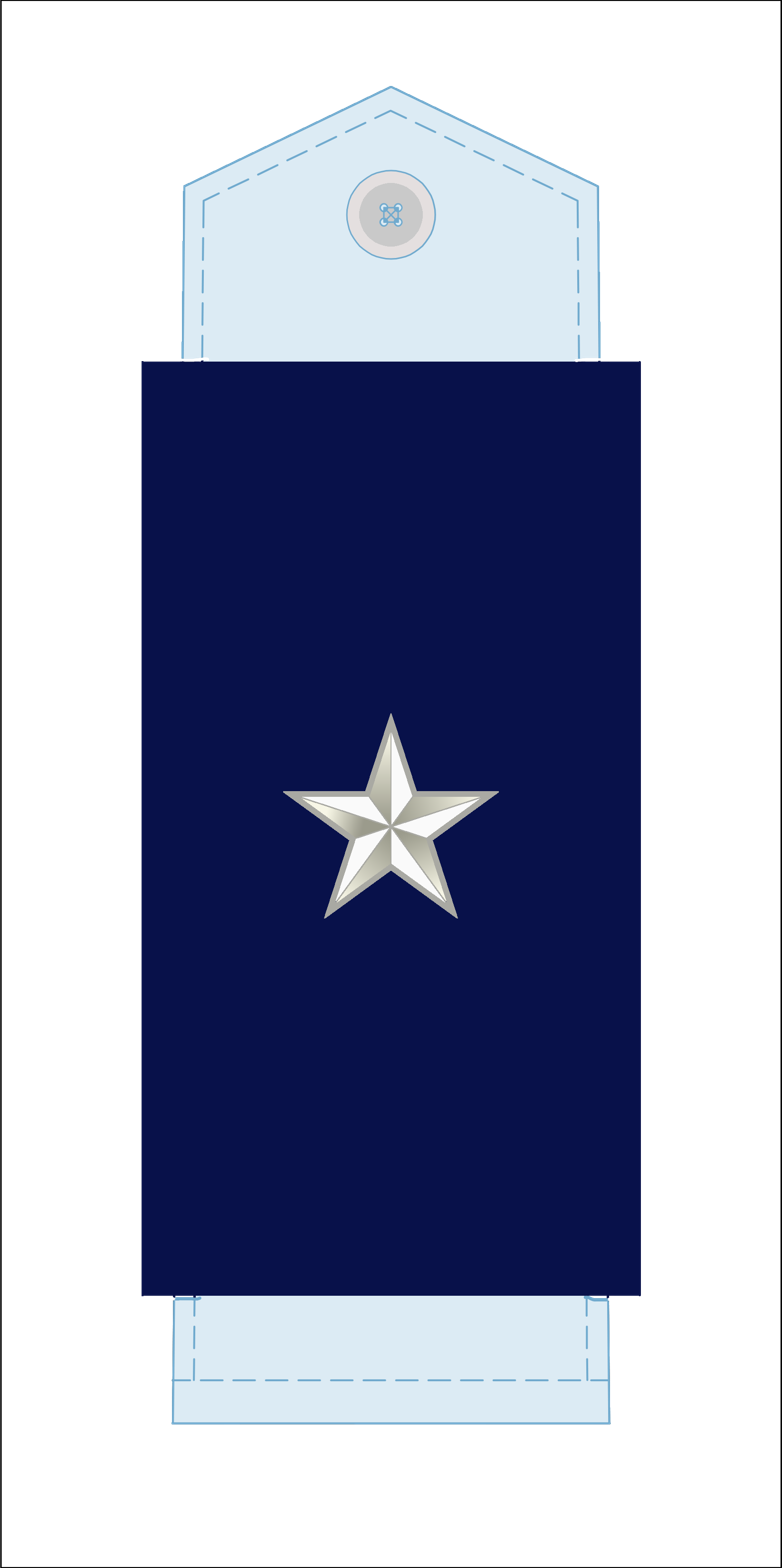
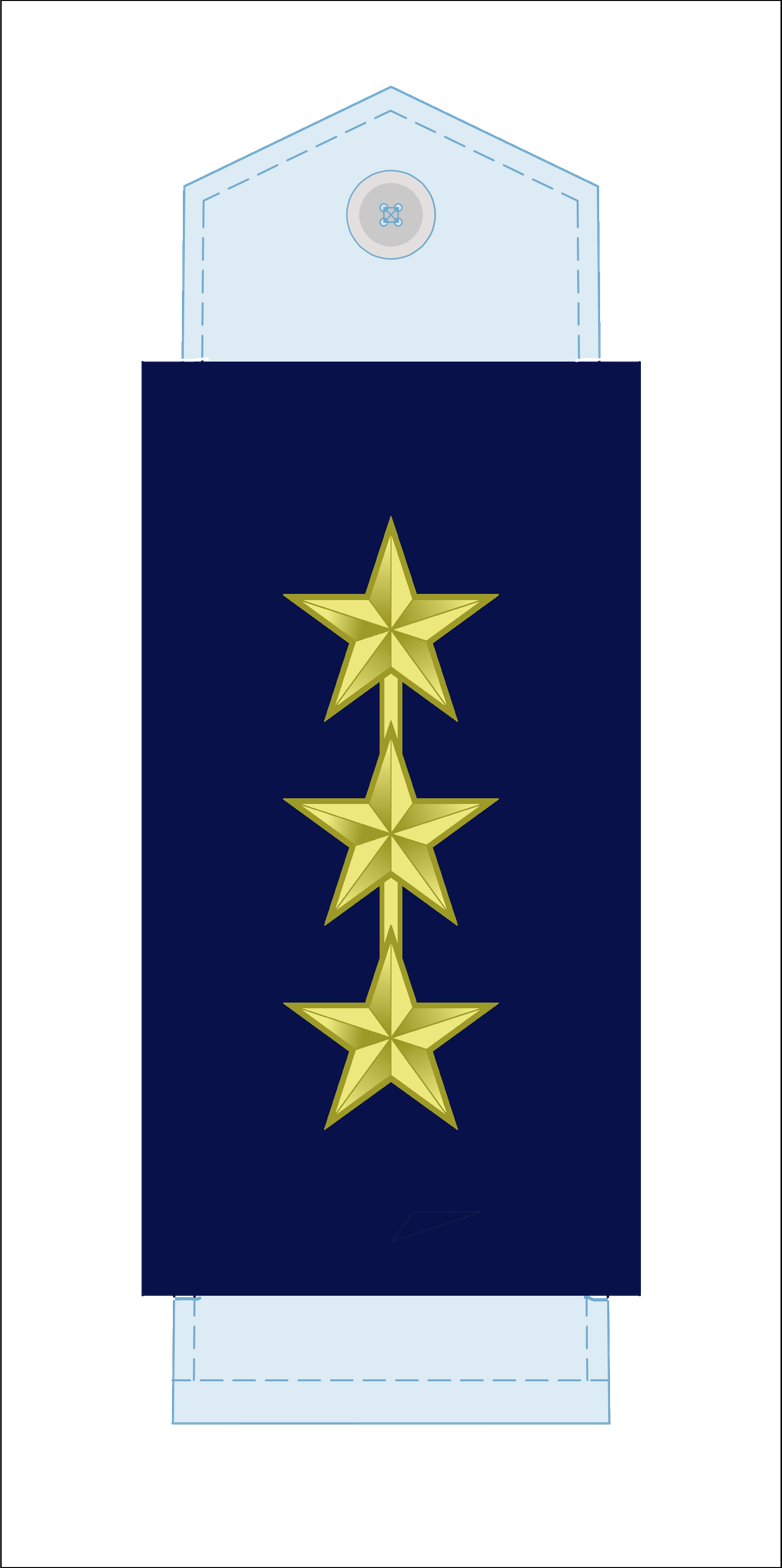
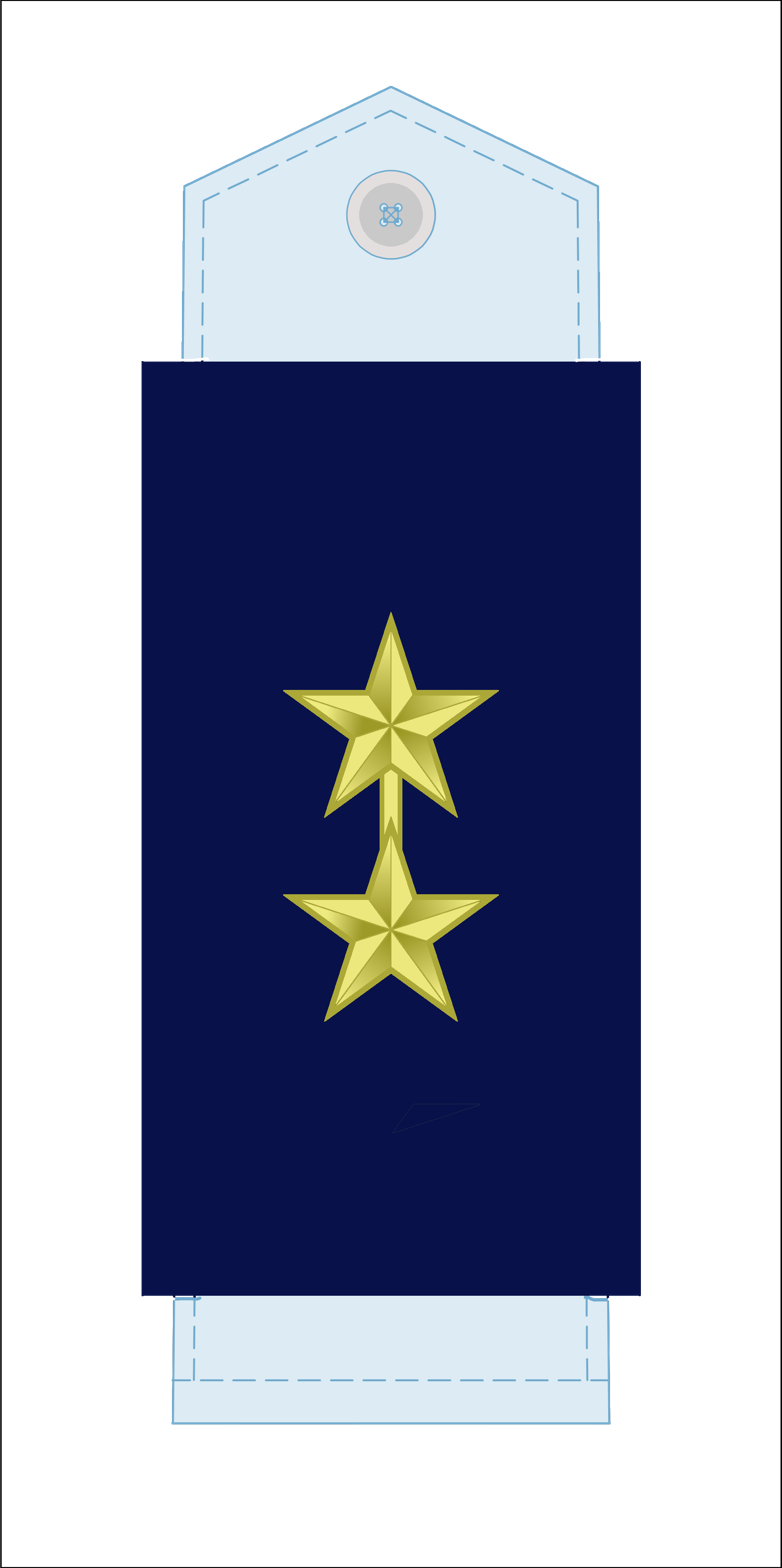
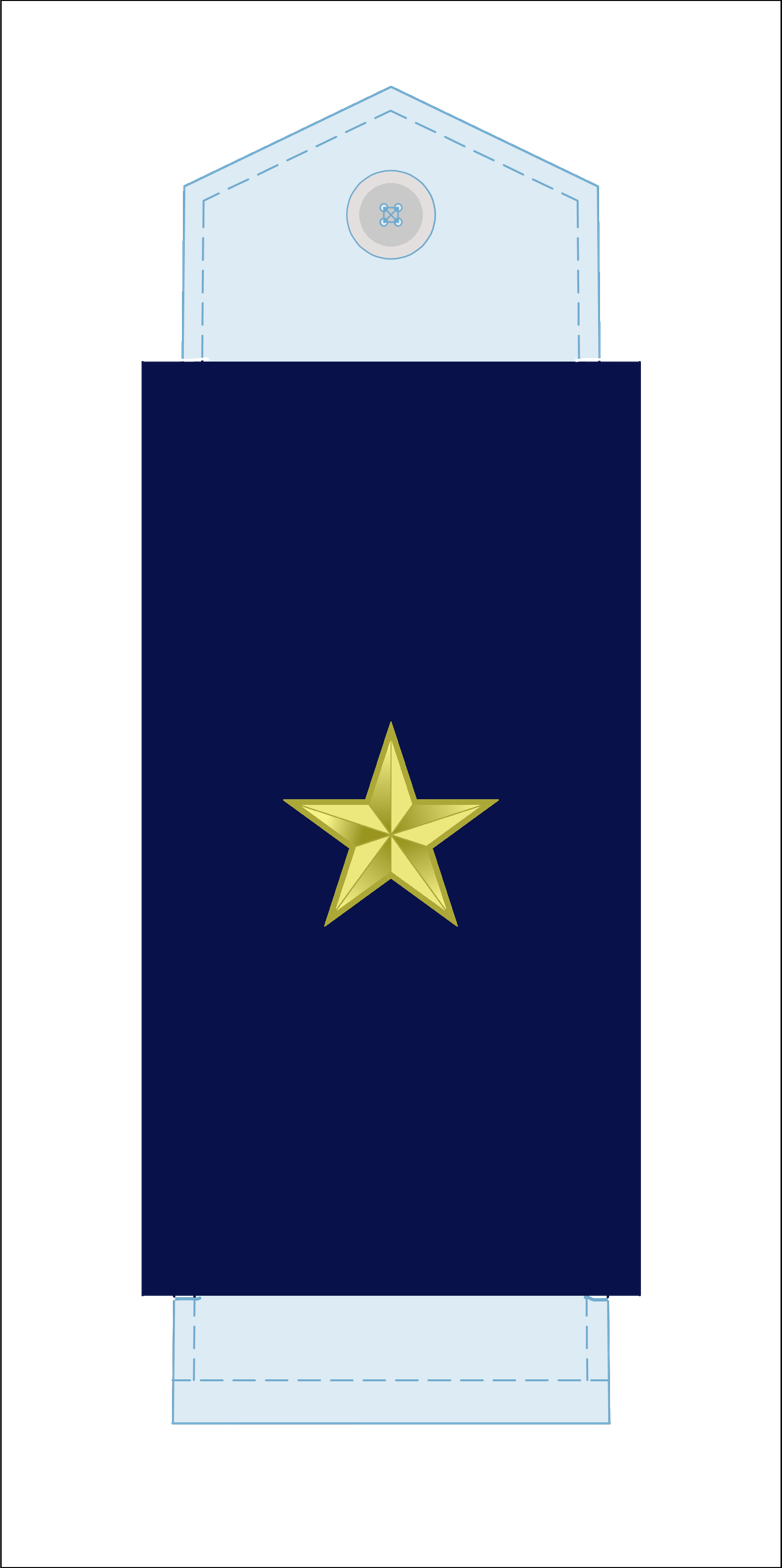
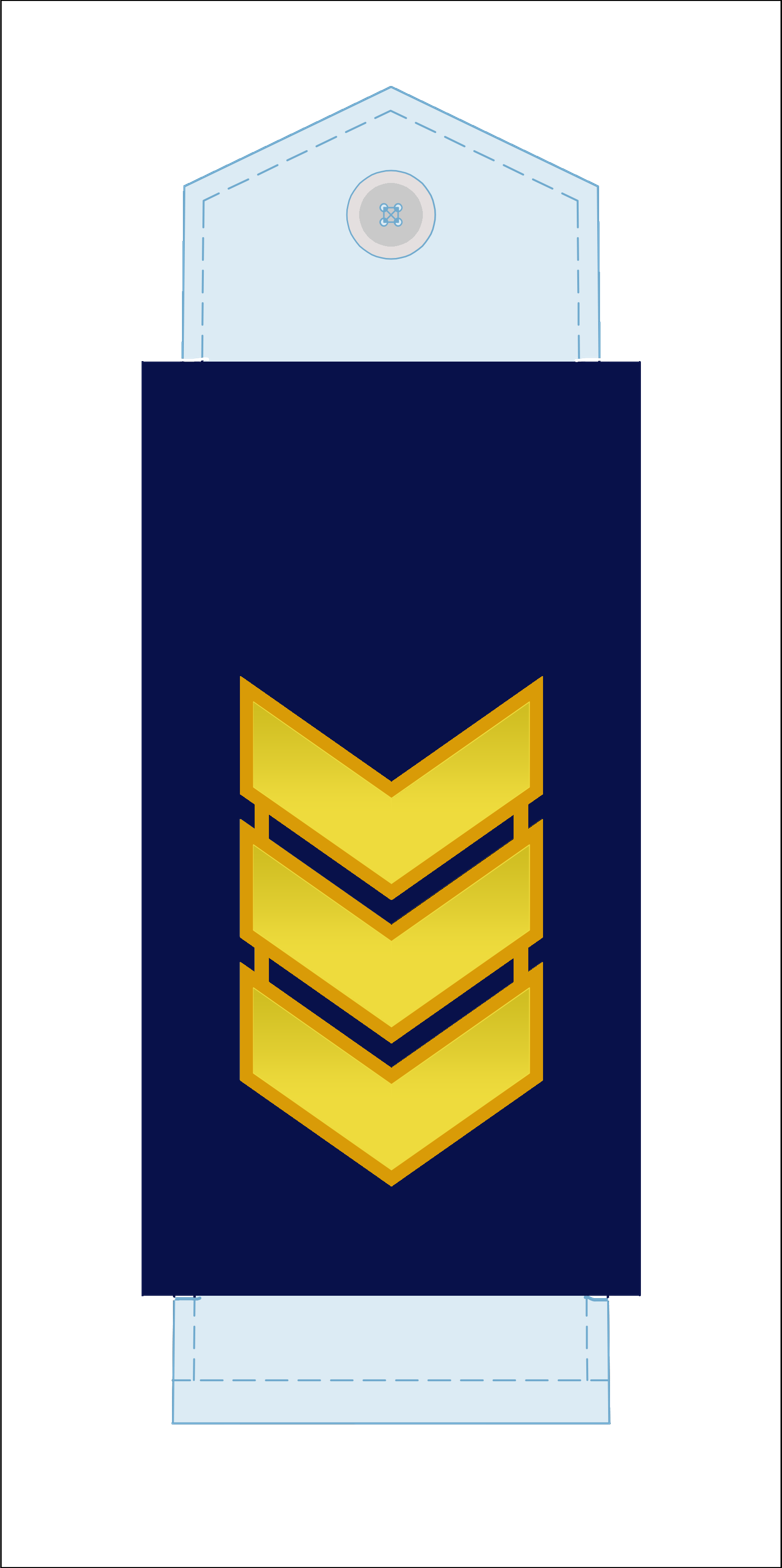
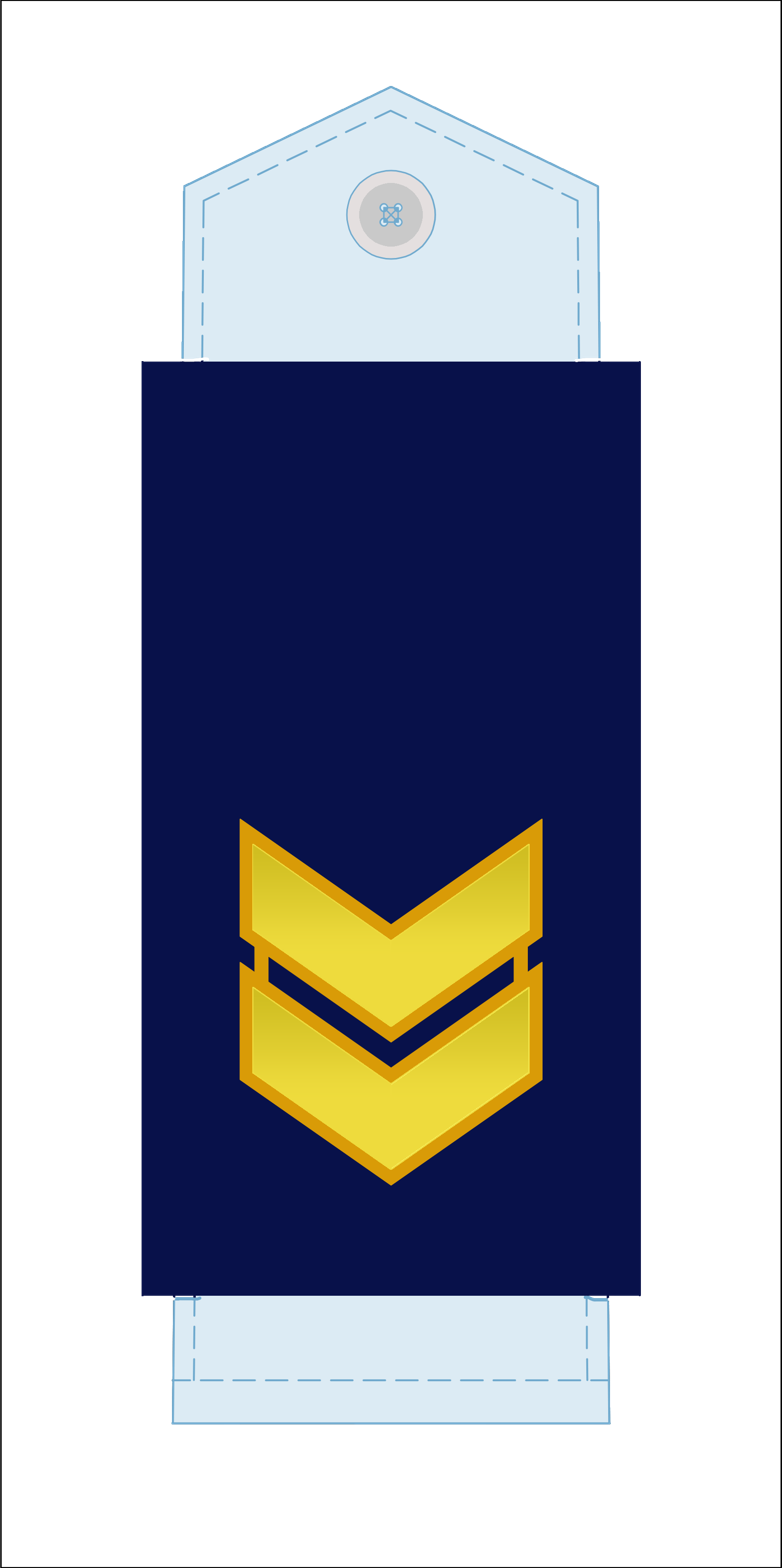
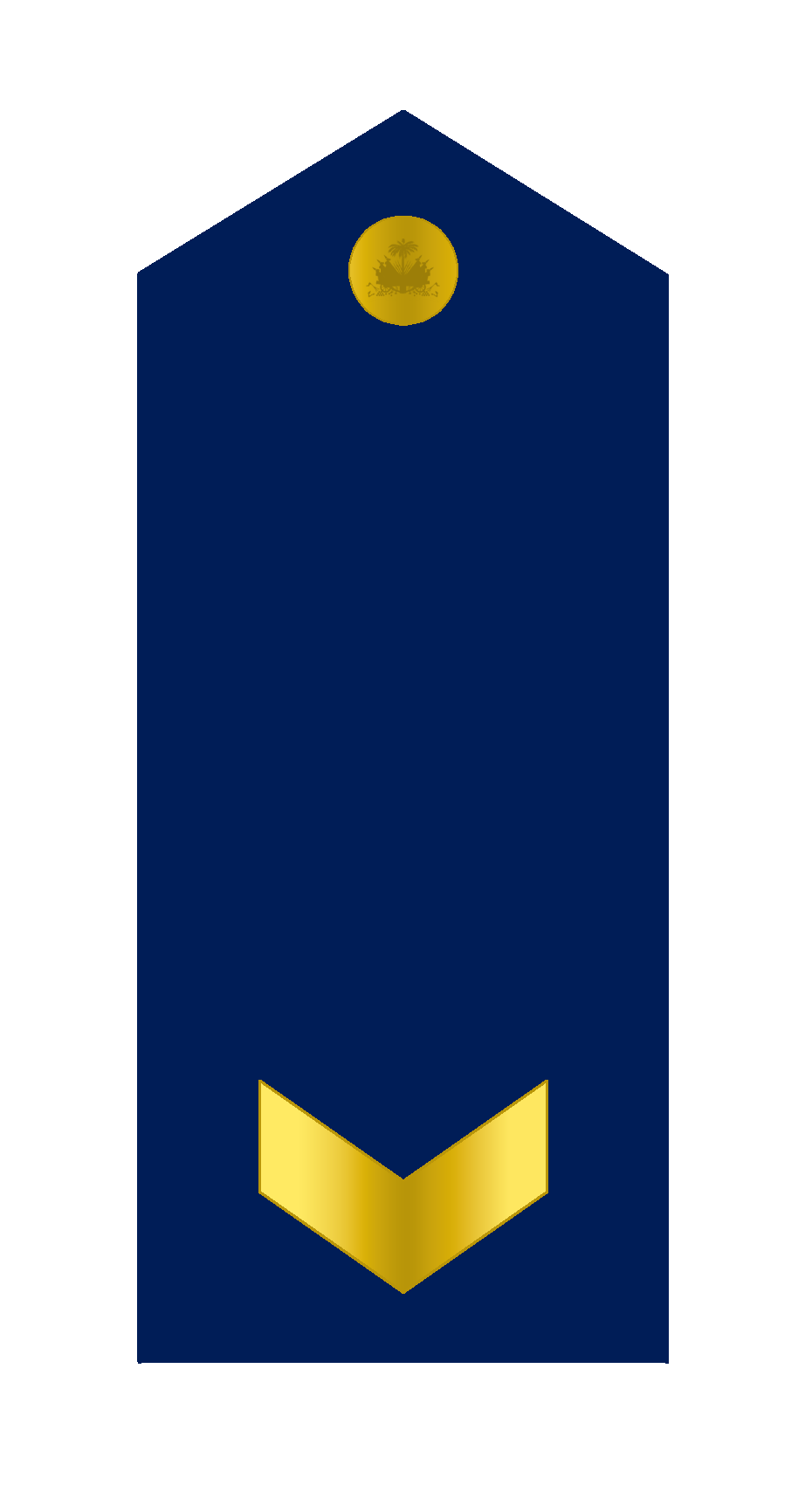
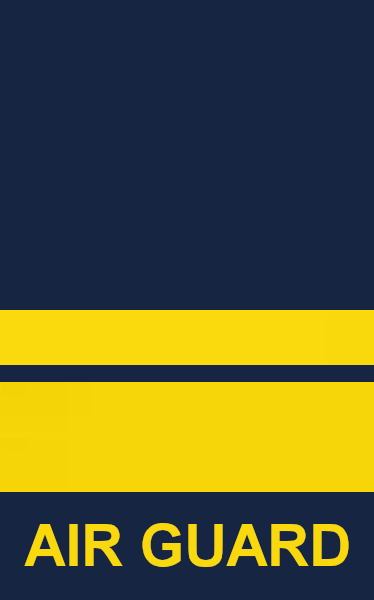
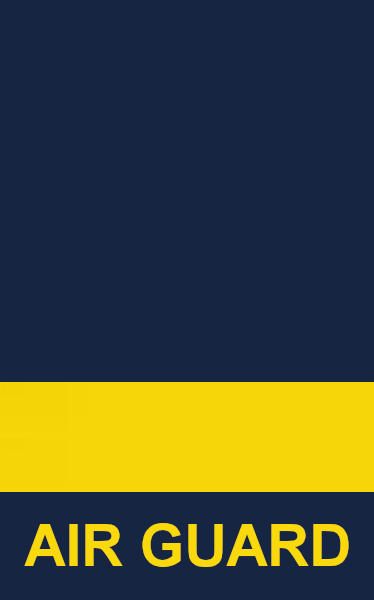
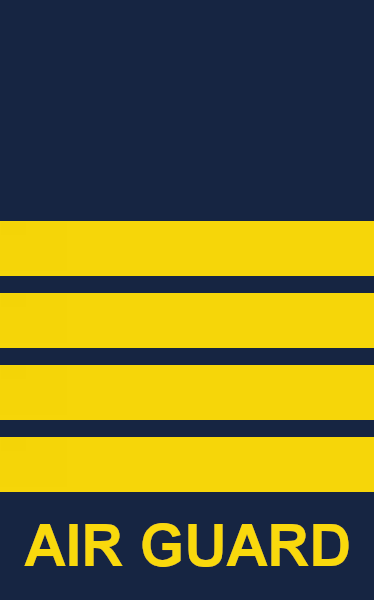
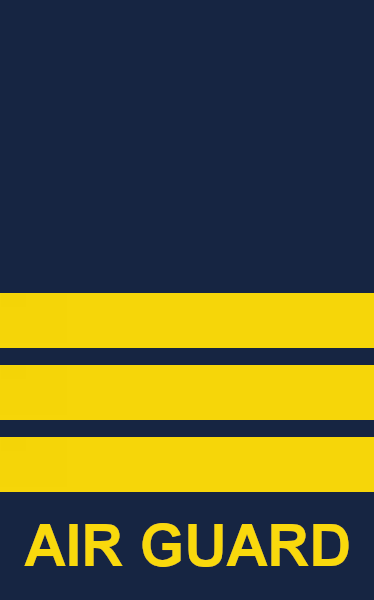
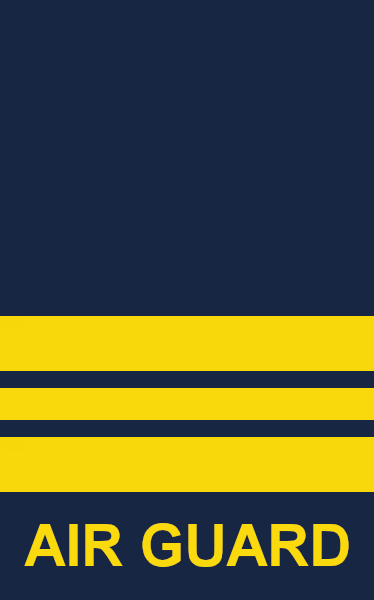
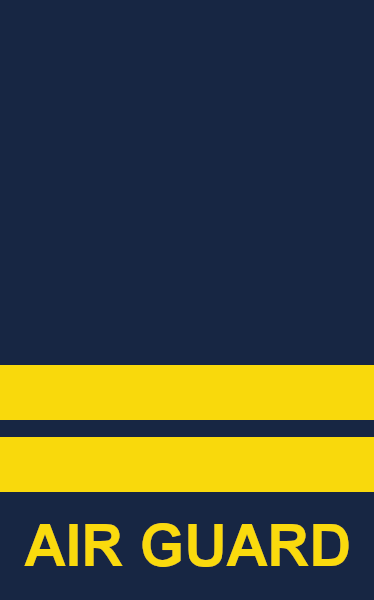
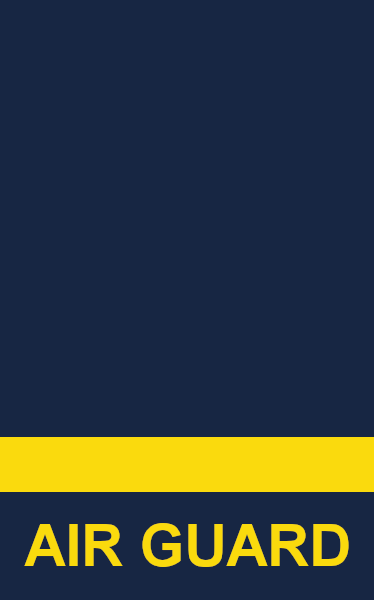
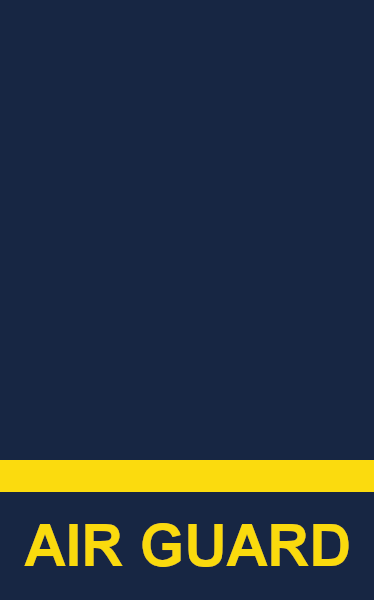
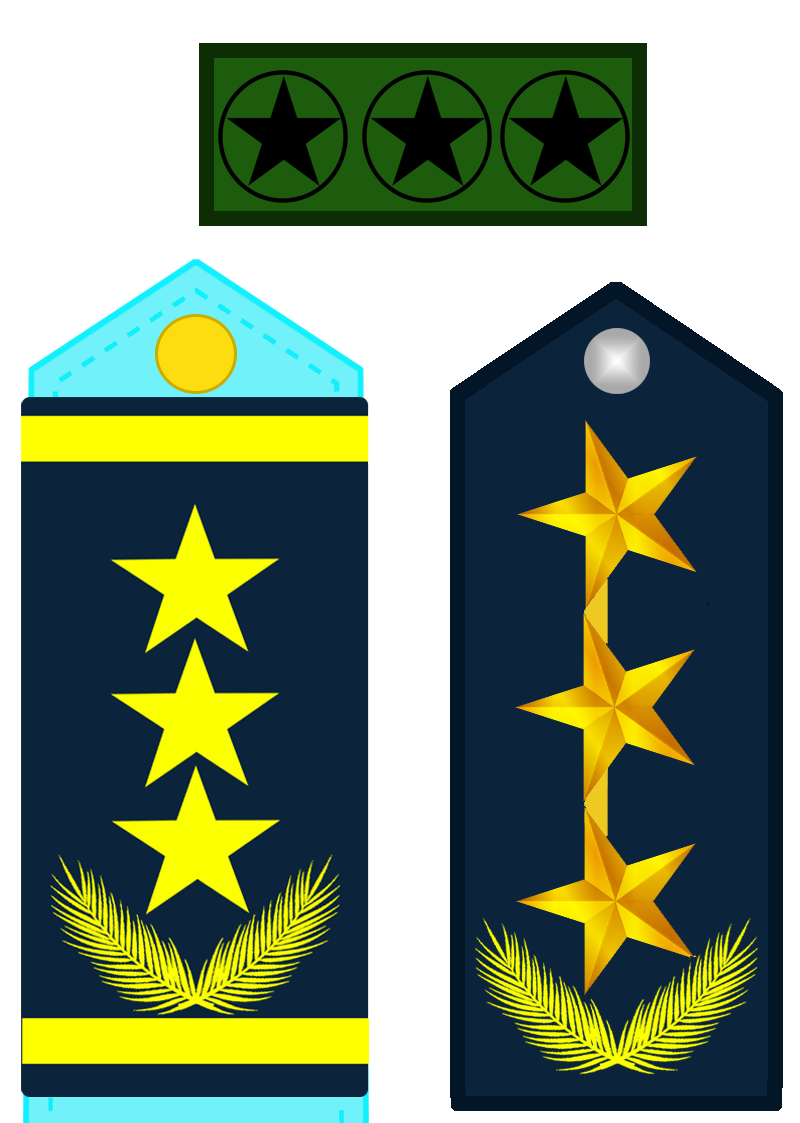
Rank group	General / flag officers					Senior officers				Junior officers
Antigua and Barbuda	No air force
Argentine Air Force
Argentine Air Force		Brigadier general	Brigadier mayor	Brigadier	Comodoro mayor	Comodoro		Vicecomodoro	Mayor	Capitán		Primer teniente	Teniente	Alférez
(The Bahamas) Bahamas	No air force
Barbados	No air force
Belize Defence Force Air Wing
Belize Defence Force Air Wing									Major	Captain		Lieutenant		Second lieutenant
Bolivian Air Force
Bolivian Air Force		General de fuerza aeréa	General de división aeréa	General de brigada aeréa		Coronel aviador		Teniente coronel aviador	Mayor aviador	Captáin aviador		Teniente aviador		Subteniente aviador
Brazilian Air Force
Brazilian Air Force	Marechal-do-ar	Tenente-brigadeiro do Ar	Major-brigadeiro	Brigadeiro		Coronel		Tenente-coronel	Major	Capitão		Primeiro-tenente		Segundo-tenente
Royal Canadian Air Force
Royal Canadian Air Force		General	Lieutenant-general	Major-general	Brigadier-general	Colonel		Lieutenant-colonel	Major	Captain		Lieutenant		Second lieutenant
Royal Canadian Air Force		Général(e)	Lieutenant(e)-général(e)	Major(e)-général(e)	Brigadier(ère)-général(e)	Colonel(le)		Lieutenant(e)-colonel(le)	Major(e)	Capitaine		Lieutenant(e)		Sous-lieutenant(e)
Chilean Air Force
Chilean Air Force		General de aire	General de aviación	General de brigada aérea	Comodoro	Coronel de aviación		Comandante de grupo	Comandante de escuadrilla	Capitán de bandada		Teniente	Subteniente	Alférez
Colombian Aerospace Force
Colombian Aerospace Force		General del aire		Mayor general del aire	Brigadier general del aire	Coronel		Teniente coronel	Mayor	Capitán		Teniente		Subteniente
Rank group	General / flag officers					Senior officers				Junior officers
Costa Rica	No air force
Cuban Air and Air Defense Force
Cuban Air and Air Defense Force		General del Aire	General de cuerpo de ejército	General de división	General de brigada	Primer coronel	Coronel	Teniente coronel	Mayor	Capitán		Primer teniente	Teniente	Subteniente
Dominica	No air force
Dominican Air Force
Dominican Air Force			Teniente general	Mayor general	General de brigada	Coronel		Teniente coronel	Mayor	Capitán		Primer teniente		Segundo teniente
Ecuadorian Air Force
Ecuadorian Air Force		General del aire	Teniente general	Brigadier general		Coronel		Teniente coronel	Mayor	Capitán		Teniente		Subteniente
Salvadoran Air Force
Salvadoran Air Force		General del aire	General de avación	General de brigada aérea	Brigadier	Coronel		Teniente coronel	Mayor	Capitán		Teniente		Subteniente
Grenada	No air force
Guatemalan Air Force
Guatemalan Air Force				General de división	General de brigada	Coronel		Teniente coronel	Mayor	Capitán primero	Capitán segundo	Teniente		Subteniente
Guyana Air Corps
Guyana Air Corps								Lieutenant Colonel	Major	Captain		Lieutenant		Second lieutenant
Haitian Aviation Corps
Haitian Aviation Corps			Lieutenant général	Major général	Général de brigade	Colonel		Lieutenant-colonel	Major	Capitaine		Lieutenant		Sous-lieutenant
Haitian Aviation Corps			Lyetnan jeneral	Majò jeneral	Jeneral brigad	Kolonèl		Lyetnan kolonèl	Majò	Kapitèn		Lyetnan		Soulyetnan
Honduran Air Force
Honduran Air Force				General de división	General de brigada	Coronel		Teniente coronel	Mayor	Capitán		Teniente		Subteniente
Jamaican Air Wing
Jamaican Air Wing								Lieutenant colonel	Major	Captain		First lieutenant		Second lieutenant
Mexican Air Force
Mexican Air Force			General de división	General de ala	General de grupo	Coronel		Teniente coronel	Mayor	Capitan primero	Capitán segundo	Teniente		Subteniente
Rank group	General / flag officers					Senior officers				Junior officers
Nicaraguan Air Force
Nicaraguan Air Force		General de ejército	Coronel general	Mayor general	General de brigada	Coronel		Teniente coronel	Mayor	Capitán		Teniente primero		Teniente
Panama	No air force
Paraguayan Air Force
Paraguayan Air Force		General de fuerza aerea	General de división	General de brigada		Coronel		Teniente coronel	Mayor	Capitán		Teniente primero	Teniente	Subteniente
Peruvian Air Force
Peruvian Air Force		General del aire	Teniente general	Mayor general		Coronel		Comandante	Mayor	Capitán		Teniente		Alférez
Saint Kitts and Nevis	No air force
Saint Lucia	No air force
Saint Vincent and the Grenadines	No air force
Trinidad and Tobago Air Guard
Trinidad and Tobago Air Guard				Air vice marshal	Air commodore	Group captain		Wing commander	Squadron leader	Flight lieutenant		Flying officer		Pilot officer
United States Air Force
United States Air Force	General of the Air Force	General	Lieutenant general	Major general	Brigadier general	Colonel		Lieutenant colonel	Major	Captain		First lieutenant		Second lieutenant
United States Space Force
United States Space Force		General	Lieutenant general	Major general	Brigadier general	Colonel		Lieutenant colonel	Major	Captain		First lieutenant		Second lieutenant
Uruguayan Air Force
Uruguayan Air Force		General del Aire		Brigadier general		Coronel		Teniente coronel	Mayor	Capitán		Teniente primero	Teniente segundo	Alférez
Venezuelan Air Force
Venezuelan Air Force		General en jefe	Mayor general	General de division	General de brigada	Coronel		Teniente coronel	Mayor	Capitán		Primer teniente		Teniente
Rank group	General / flag officers					Senior officers				Junior officers

== See also ==
- Air force officer rank insignia
- Comparative air force enlisted ranks of the Americas
