= Tiff =

TIFF is an acronym for Tagged Image File Format, a file format for storing images.

Tiff or TIFF may also refer to:

== Film festivals ==
- Tbilisi International Film Festival, held in Tbilisi, Georgia, since 2000
- Thessaloniki International Film Festival, held in Thessaloniki, Greece, since 1960
- Tigerland India Film Festival, held in India, since 2014
- Tokyo International Film Festival, held in Tokyo, Japan, since 1985
- Toronto International Film Festival, held in Toronto, Canada, since 1976
- Transilvania International Film Festival, held in Cluj-Napoca, Romania, since 2001
- Tromsø International Film Festival, held in Tromsø, Norway, since 1991

== People ==
=== Given name or nickname ===
- Tiff Joy, stage name of American gospel singer Tiffany Joy McGhee (born 1986)
- Tiff Lacey (born 1985), British singer
- Tiff Macklem (born 1961), Canadian banker and Governor of the Bank of Canada
- Tiff Needell (born 1951), British racing driver and television presenter
- Timothy Findley (1930–2002), Canadian novelist and playwright nicknamed "Tiff"
- Tiff Stevenson (born 1978), English stand-up comedian, writer and actress

=== Surname ===
- Milan Tiff (born 1949), American track and field athlete

== Places ==
- Tiff, Missouri, an unincorporated community in Washington County, Missouri, U.S.
- Tiff City, Missouri, an unincorporated community in McDonald County, Missouri, U.S.

== Other uses ==
- Baryte, or tiff, a mineral consisting of barium sulfate
- "Tiff" (song), a 2013 song by Simi
- Tiff, a character in the Kirby franchise
- Tooth interior fatigue fracture (TIFF), a type of gear failure

== See also ==
- TIF (disambiguation)
- TIFFE (disambiguation)
- Tifi (disambiguation)
- Tiffs, a nickname for branch badges worn by the British Royal Navy
