= Naval rating =

Junior enlisted ranks of a country's navy

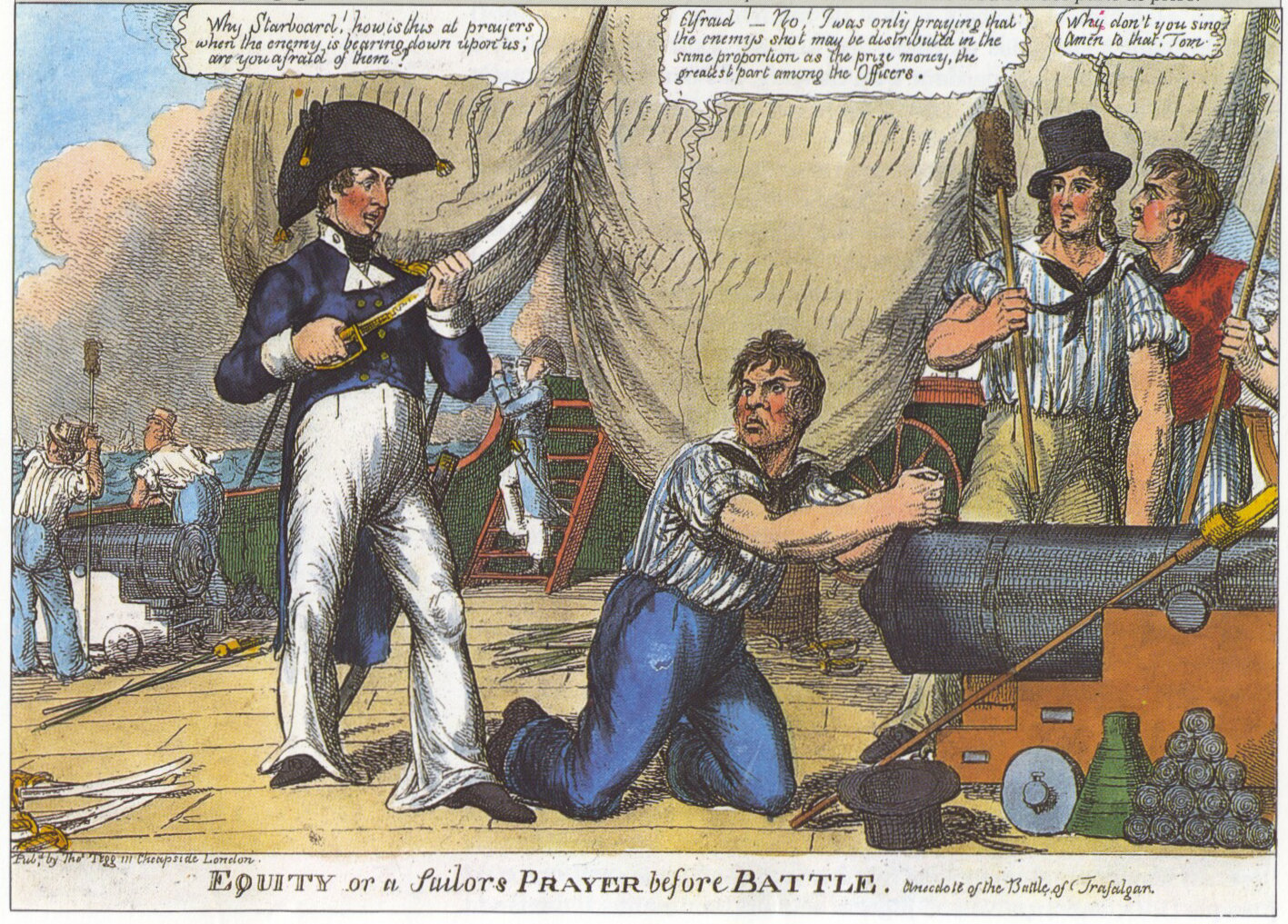
Equity or a Sailor's Prayer before Battle, from the Battle of Trafalgar. A 19th-century caricature portraying ratings on a Royal Navy ship. The man with a sword is a commissioned officer, as is the man on the ladder with the telescope. All others are ratings.

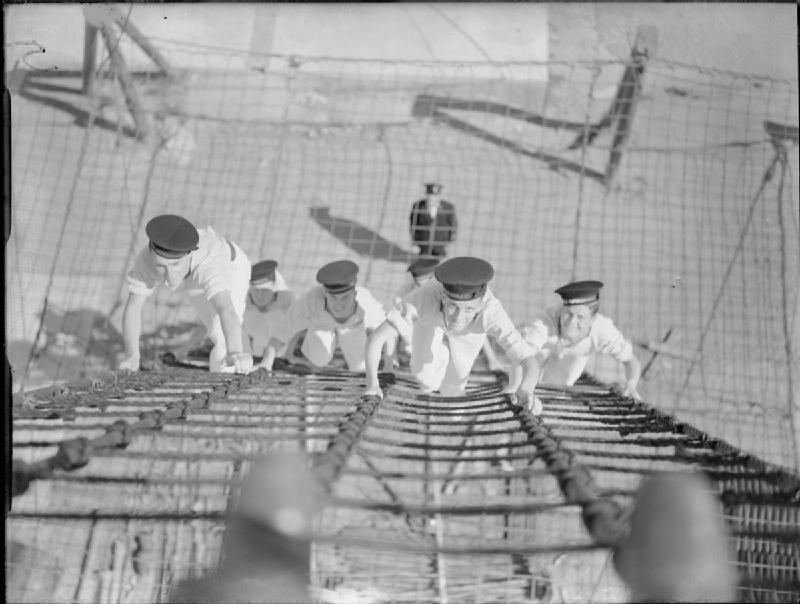
The Royal Navy during the Second World War. Six naval rating recruits of the training ship HMS Impregnable, Devonport, scramble up the rigging during a daily training exercise.

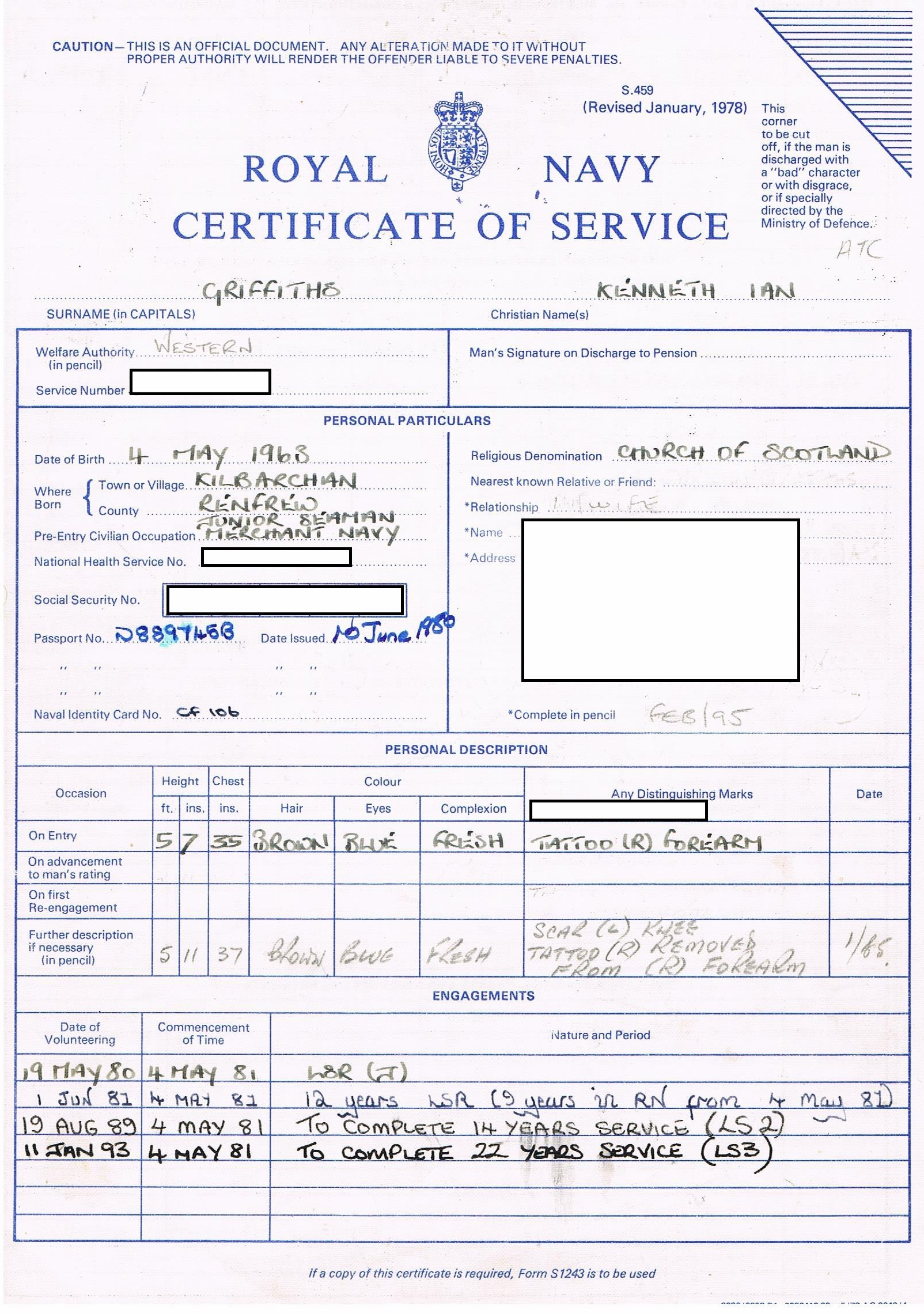
Royal Navy Certificate of Service (Form S.459), given to all ratings on discharge.

In military terminology, a rate or rating (also known as bluejacket in the United States) is a junior enlisted sailor in a navy who is below the military rank of warrant officer. Depending on the country and navy that uses it, the exact term and the range of ranks that it refers to may vary.

== Royal Navy ==
In the Royal Navy (RN) and other navies in the Commonwealth, rate and rating are interchangeably used to refer to an enlisted sailor who is ranked below warrant officers and commissioned officers, but may include petty officers and chief petty officers. Specifically, rate is the term used to describe generically all members of all ranks below a warrant officer; whereas rating is part of the official name of individual specific ranks, such as Able Rating and Leading Rating.

The term comes from the general nautical usage of 'rating', to refer to a seaman's class or grade as recorded in the ship's books. The system of conferring authority on sailors in the Royal Navy evolved through the recognition of competence: landsman, ordinary seaman, able seaman, through to the appointment of authority as a petty officer.

The general structure for ratings in the Royal Navy now used breaks down into four major groupings:

- Able Rating (OR-2)
- Leading Rating (OR-4)
- Petty Officer (OR-5/OR-6)
- Chief Petty Officer (OR-7)

Rank insignia of the warrant officers and ratings of the Royal Navy
Rank group	Warrant officers		Senior ratings			Junior ratings
NATO code	OR-9	OR-8	OR-7	OR-6	OR-5	OR-4	OR-2
Arm insignia							No insignia
Shoulder insignia
Rank	Warrant Officer 1	Warrant Officer 2	Chief Petty Officer	Petty Officer		Leading Rating	Able Rating
Abbreviation	WO1	WO2	CPO	PO		LH	AB

== United States Navy and United States Coast Guard ==
In the United States Navy (USN), the term bluejacket is used instead to refer to enlisted sailors that rank below a chief petty officer. 'Bluejacket' derives itself from an item of clothing that was worn by junior enlisted sailors before 1886. It was used especially when the sailors were deployed ashore as infantry.

In the United States Navy and United States Coast Guard, the term rate refers to an enlisted member's pay grade (i.e. relative seniority or rank), while rating refers to occupational field. In the U.S. Navy and Coast Guard, an enlisted sailor is most commonly addressed, both verbally and in correspondence, by a combination of their rate and rating rather than by rate alone, unlike in other branches of the armed forces. For example, a sailor whose rate is 'Petty Officer 1st Class' (pay grade E-6) and whose rating is 'boatswain's mate' would be addressed as 'Boatswain's Mate 1st Class' (abbreviated BM1). However, it is also correct to address sailors in pay grades E-4 through E-6 simply as 'petty officer' (e.g. 'Petty Officer Jane Smith') and pay grades E-7, E-8, and E-9 are addressed as 'Chief', 'Senior Chief', or 'Master Chief' respectively. Pay grades E-3 and below maybe referred to as their rate and rating, a Gunner's Mate Seaman Apprentice would be 'GMSA'. Those who do not have a rating, are sometimes referred to as 'non-rates', and simply addressed as 'Seaman', or by their last name alone; i.e. 'Seaman Jones' or merely 'Jones'.

== See also ==
- Royal Navy ratings rank insignia
- Rating system of the Royal Navy
- List of United States Navy ratings
- List of United States Navy enlisted rates
- List of United States Coast Guard ratings
- The Bluejacket's Manual
