= Cap badge =

Badge worn on uniform headgear

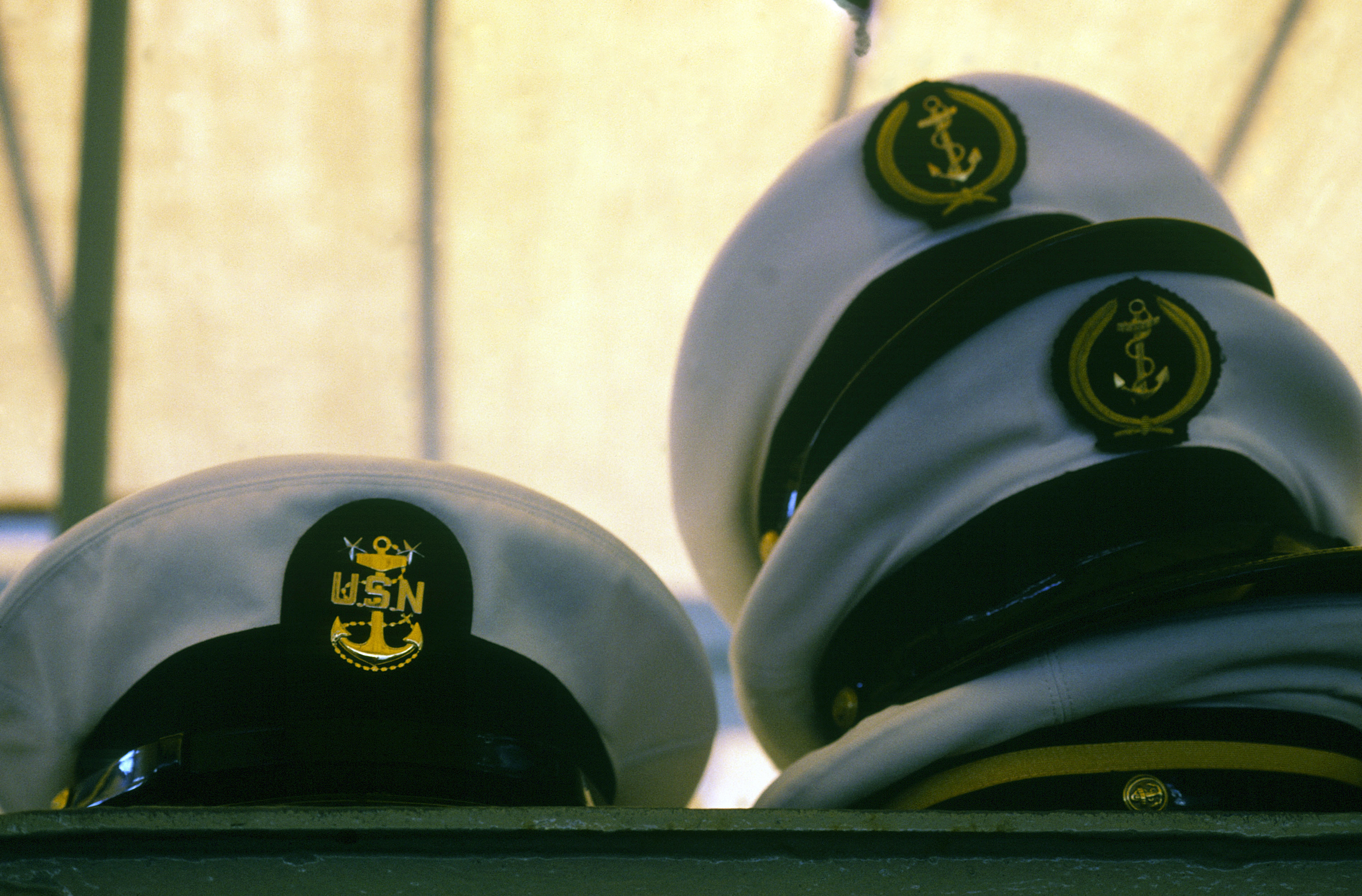
Cap badge of the United States Navy on the left and cap badges of the French Navy (Marine Nationale) on the right.

A cap badge, also known as head badge or hat badge, is a badge worn on uniform headgear and distinguishes the wearer's nationality and/or organisation. The wearing of cap badges is a convention commonly found among military and police forces, as well as uniformed civilian groups such as the Boy Scouts, civil defence organisations, ambulance services (e.g. the St. John Ambulance Brigade), customs services, fire services, etc.

Cap badges are a modern form of heraldry and their design generally incorporates highly symbolic devices. Some badges that contain images of lions or other cats are sometimes informally referred to as cat badges.

== Instances in military forces ==
=== British armed forces ===
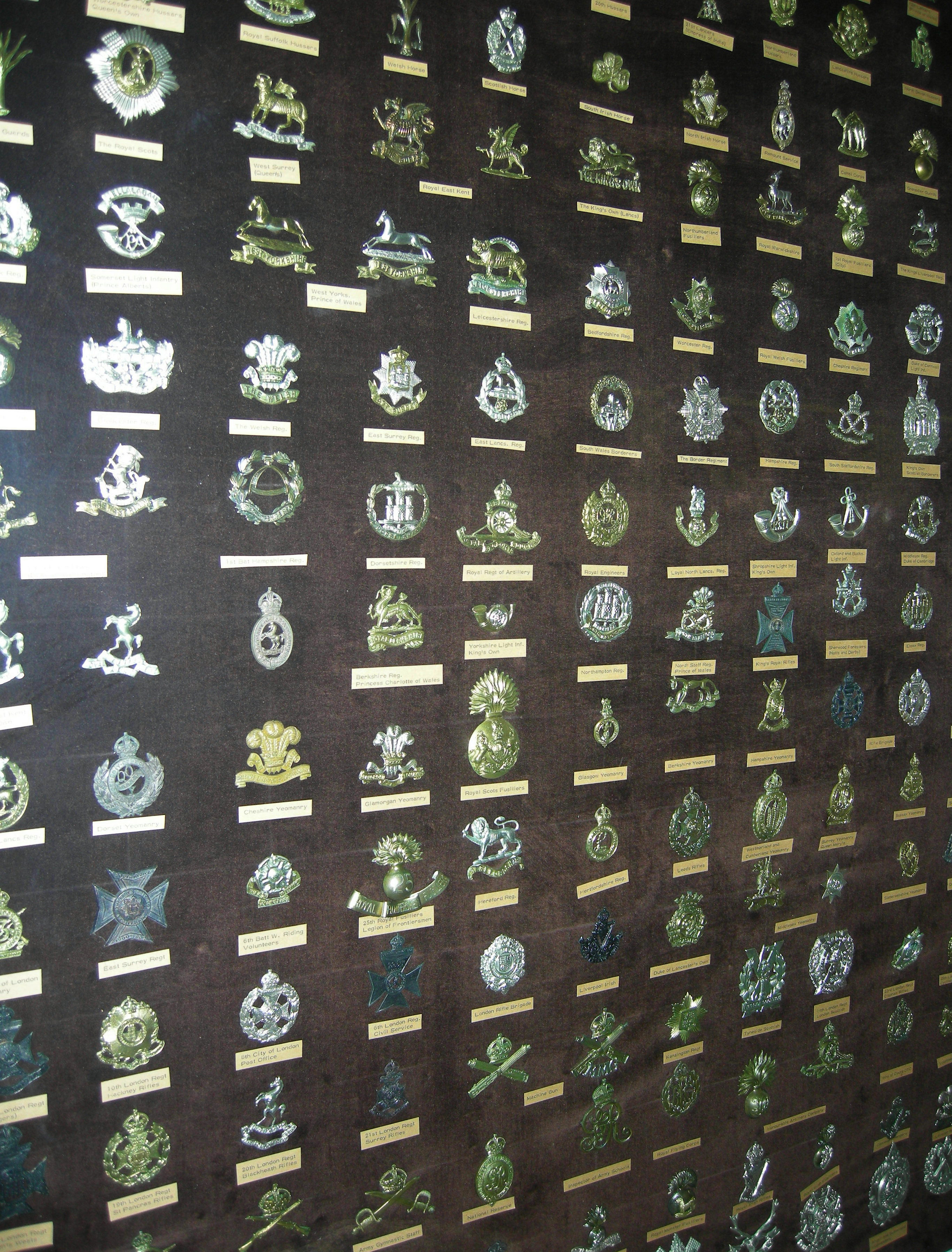
British Army cap badges at Cliffe Castle Museum, Keighley. View at max resolution to read labels.

The British Armed Forces utilise a variety of metal and cloth cap badges on their headdress, generally on caps and berets. They are also worn on Sikh turbans.

==== British Army ====
In the British Army (as well as other Commonwealth armies) each regiment and corps has its own cap badge. The cap badge of the Queen's Royal Lancers is called a motto by those within the regiment, that of the Royal Horse Artillery is known as a cypher and that of the Coldstream Guards, Scots Guards and Irish Guards is known as a cap star. That of the Grenadier Guards is known as the grenade fired proper.

The concept of regimental badges appears to have originated with the British Army. The Encyclopædia Britannica's 1911 edition notes that although branch badges for infantry, cavalry and so on were common to other armies of the time, only the British Army wore distinctive regimental devices.

===== Cap badge variations =====
Plastic cap badges were introduced during the Second World War, when metals became strategic materials. Nowadays many cap badges in the British Army are made of a material called "stay-brite" (anodised aluminium; anodising is an electro-plating process resulting in lightweight shiny badge), used because it is cheap, flexible and does not require as much maintenance as brass badges.

Regimental cap badges are usually cast as one single piece but in a number of cases they may be cast in different pieces. For instance, the badge of the now amalgamated Highlanders was cast in two separate pieces: the Queen's Crown and the thistle form one piece, and the stag's head and scroll with regimental motto form a second piece (see the first picture above).

The Royal Corps of Signals also has a two-part badge, the top being a brass crown and the bottom consisting of a silver flying body of Mercury (the winged messenger of the gods – 'Jimmy') above a brass world and the motto certa cito ('swift and sure').

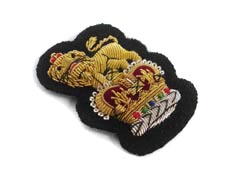
Cap badge of British Army colonels and brigadiers.

A regiment or battalion may maintain variations of the same cap badge for different ranks. These variations are usually in the badges' material, size and stylization. Variations in cap badges are normally made for:

- Officers: usually three-dimensional in design with more expensive materials such as silver, enamel and gilt. Most officers' beret badges are embroidered rather than metal or "stay-brite".
- Senior non-commissioned officers such as sergeants, colour sergeants and warrant officers: a more elaborate design compared with those worn by other ranks but usually not as elaborate as those worn by officers.

There are exceptions, such as the Welsh Guards, where all ranks wear a cloth cap badge. Officers wear a more elaborate version than soldiers made using gold thread and featuring a more three-dimensional design. The only exception to this is recruits in training who have to wear the brass (or more often "stay-brite") leek, often referred to as the "NAAFI fork"; only once they have passed out of training and reached their battalion will they receive their cloth leek. All ranks of the Special Air Service wear an embroidered cap badge and all ranks of The Rifles and Royal Regiment of Fusiliers wear the same metal badge.

Some regiments maintain a blackened or subdued version of their cap badges as shiny brass cap badges may attract the enemy's attention on the battlefield. However, since the practice of British soldiers operating in theatre with regimental headdress (e.g., peaked cap, beret) has all but died out, the wearing of these has become much less common in recent years.

===== Wearing conventions =====
The cap badge is positioned differently depending on the form of headdress:

- Home Service Helmet or Wolseley Helmet: above the centre between the wearer's eyebrows.
- Service dress cap: above the centre point between the wearer's eyebrows.
- Beret: above the left eye.
- Side cap: Between the left eye and the left ear.
- Scottish tam o'shanter: Between the left eye and the left ear.
- Scottish glengarry: Between the left eye and the left ear.
- Feather bonnet: Slightly off the left ear towards the left eye.
- Fusilier cap or Busby: Slightly off the left ear towards the left eye.
- Jungle hat (as worn by the Brigade of Gurkhas in Number 2 dress): Centre front or between left eye and left ear.

Soldiers of the Gloucestershire Regiment and subsequently the Royal Gloucestershire, Berkshire and Wiltshire Regiment wore a cap badge on both the front and the rear of their headdress, a tradition maintained by soldiers in The Rifles when in service dress. The back badge is unique in the British Army and was awarded to the 28th Regiment of Foot for their actions at the Battle of Alexandria in 1801.

Additional items that reflect a regiment's historical accomplishments, such as backing cloth and hackles, may be worn behind the cap badge. In Scottish regiments, for instance, it is a tradition for soldiers to wear their cap badges on a small square piece of their regimental tartans. Officer cadets may wear a small white backing behind their badges. Members of arms such as the Adjutant General's Corps and Royal Electrical and Mechanical Engineers serving on attachment to other units often wear that regiment's beret or headdress but with their own Corps cap badge.

For a period leading up to Remembrance Day artificial poppies are worn by many people in the United Kingdom and Canada to commemorate those killed in war. On forage caps the paper petals are fitted under the left hand chin strap button.

==== Royal Air Force ====
Cap badges in the Royal Air Force differ in design between those of commissioned officers and other ranks. In addition to caps and berets, they are also worn on forage caps.

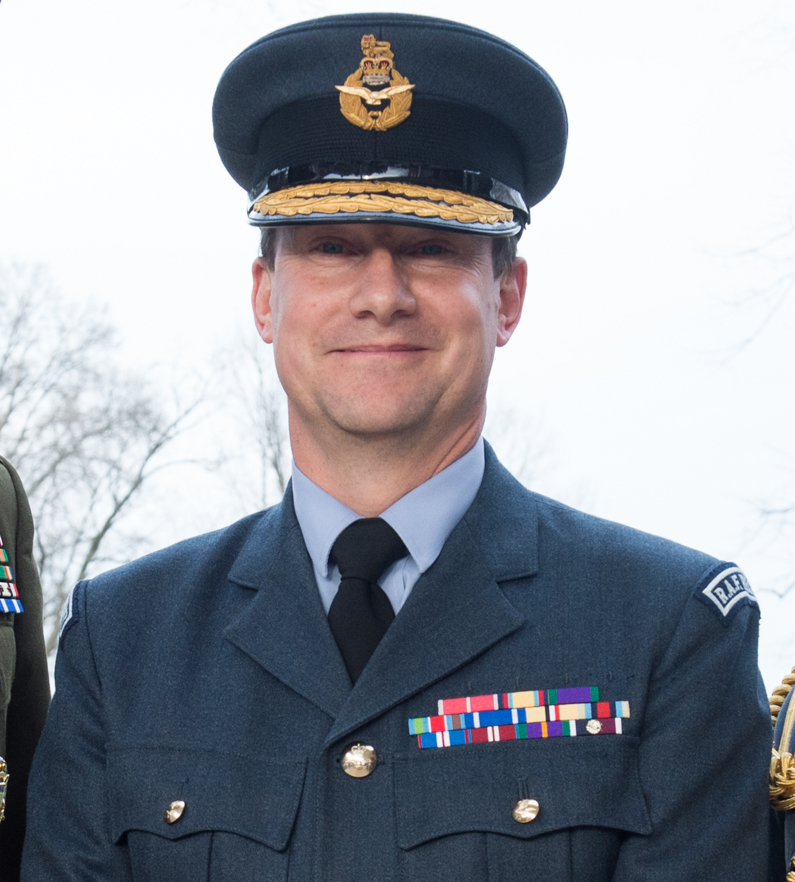
The cap badge of a senior RAF officer.

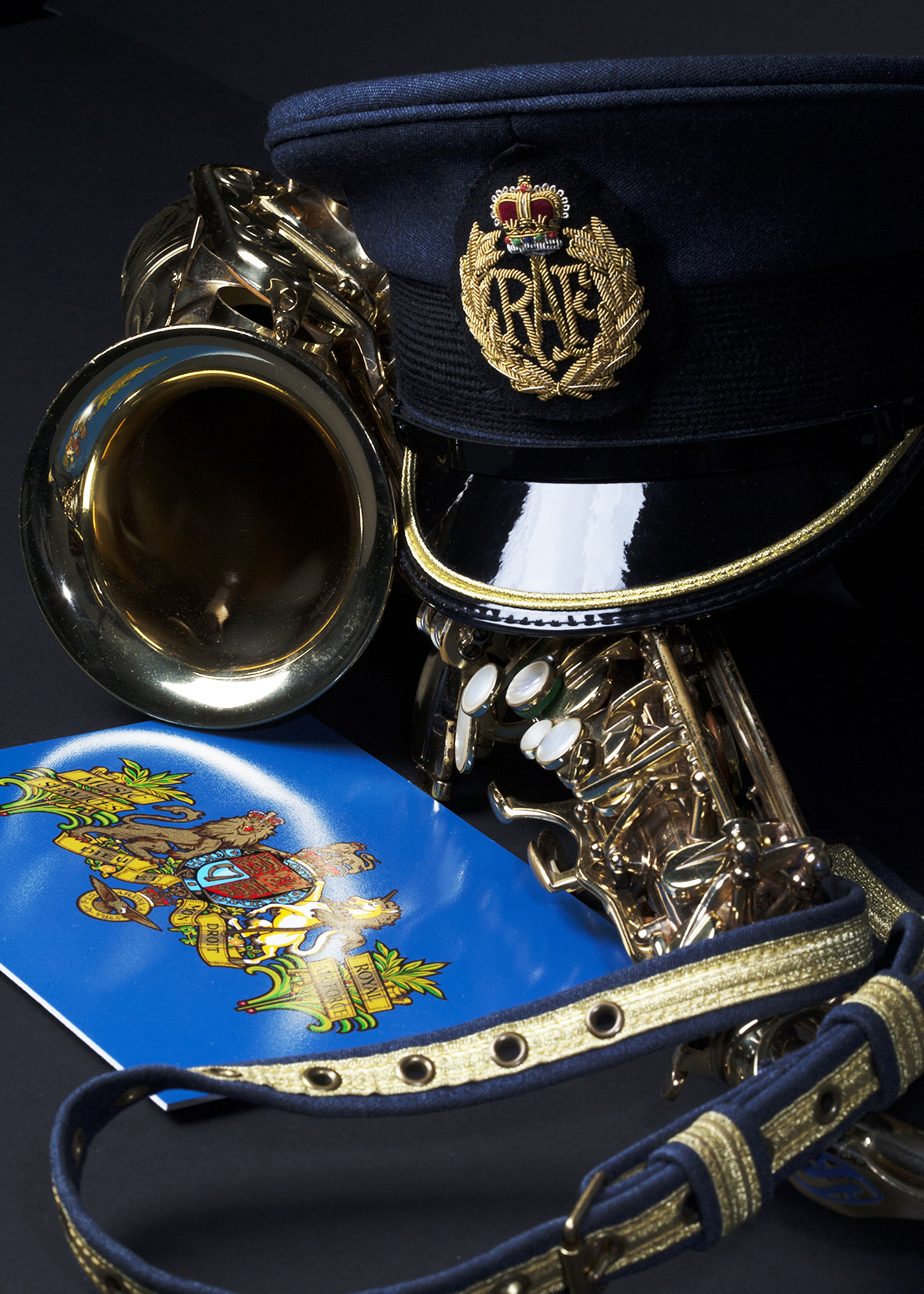
Cloth version of the cap badge of RAF other ranks. This version is worn on caps. Prior to the 1990s, RAF other ranks wore metal cap badges on peaked caps. The RAF Police still continue this practice on white-topped caps

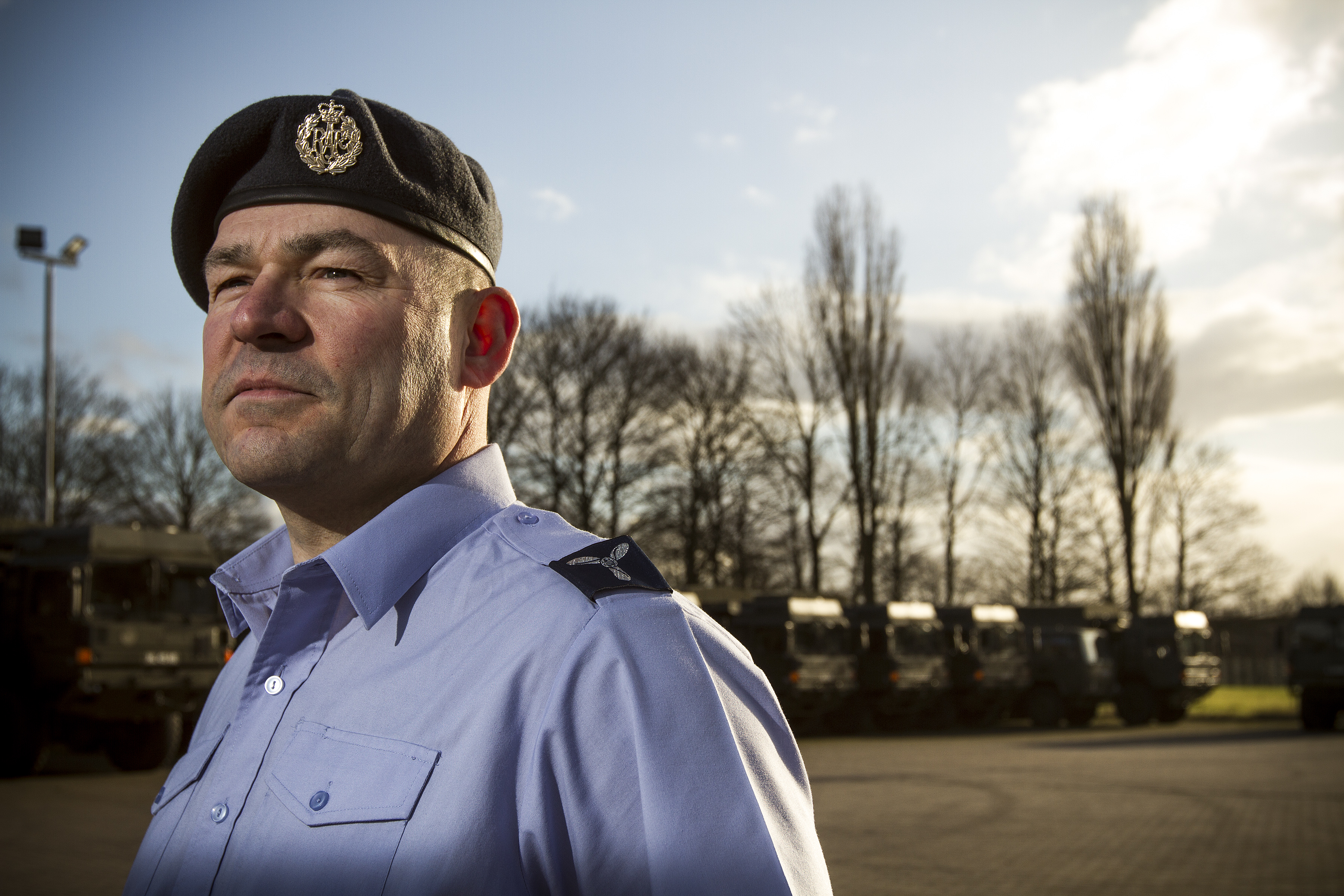
Metallic version of cap badge of RAF other ranks, worn on a beret. This version is also worn by cadets in the Royal Air Force Section of the Combined Cadet Force.

=== Canadian Armed Forces ===
The Canadian Armed Forces utilize a variety of metal and cloth cap badges on their headdress, and many follow British traditions for additions such as cloth behind and blackened metal badges for rifle regiments. Distinct cap badges identify members' personnel branch or, in the case of infantry and armoured soldiers, regimental affiliation. Some units further differentiate non-commissioned members from officers by cap badge material (for example, artillery officers wear gold-wire embroidered cloth instead of brass, while Lord Strathcona's Horse officers wear silver rather than brass).

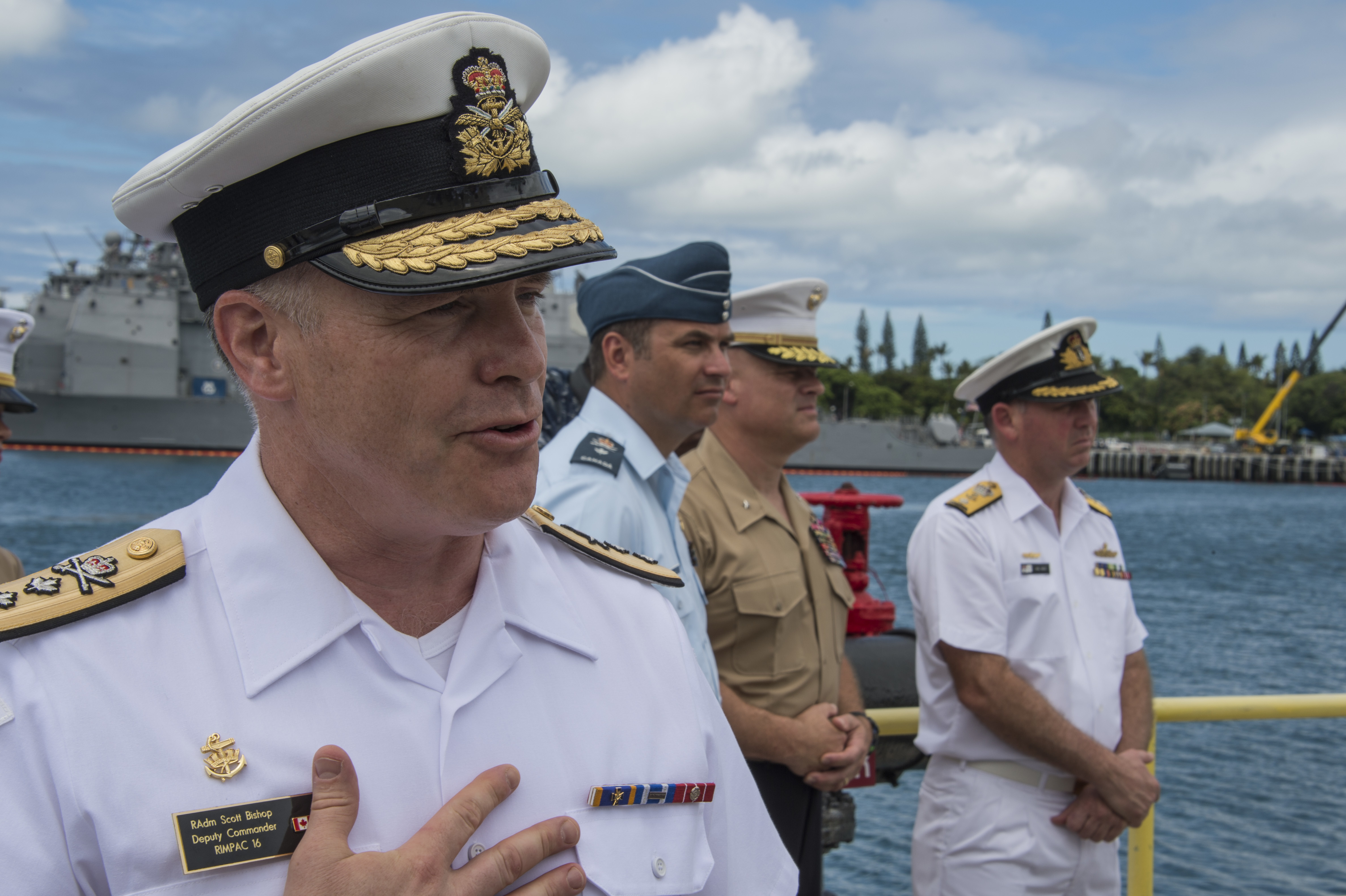
Cap badge of a flag officer on a Royal Canadian Navy peaked cap

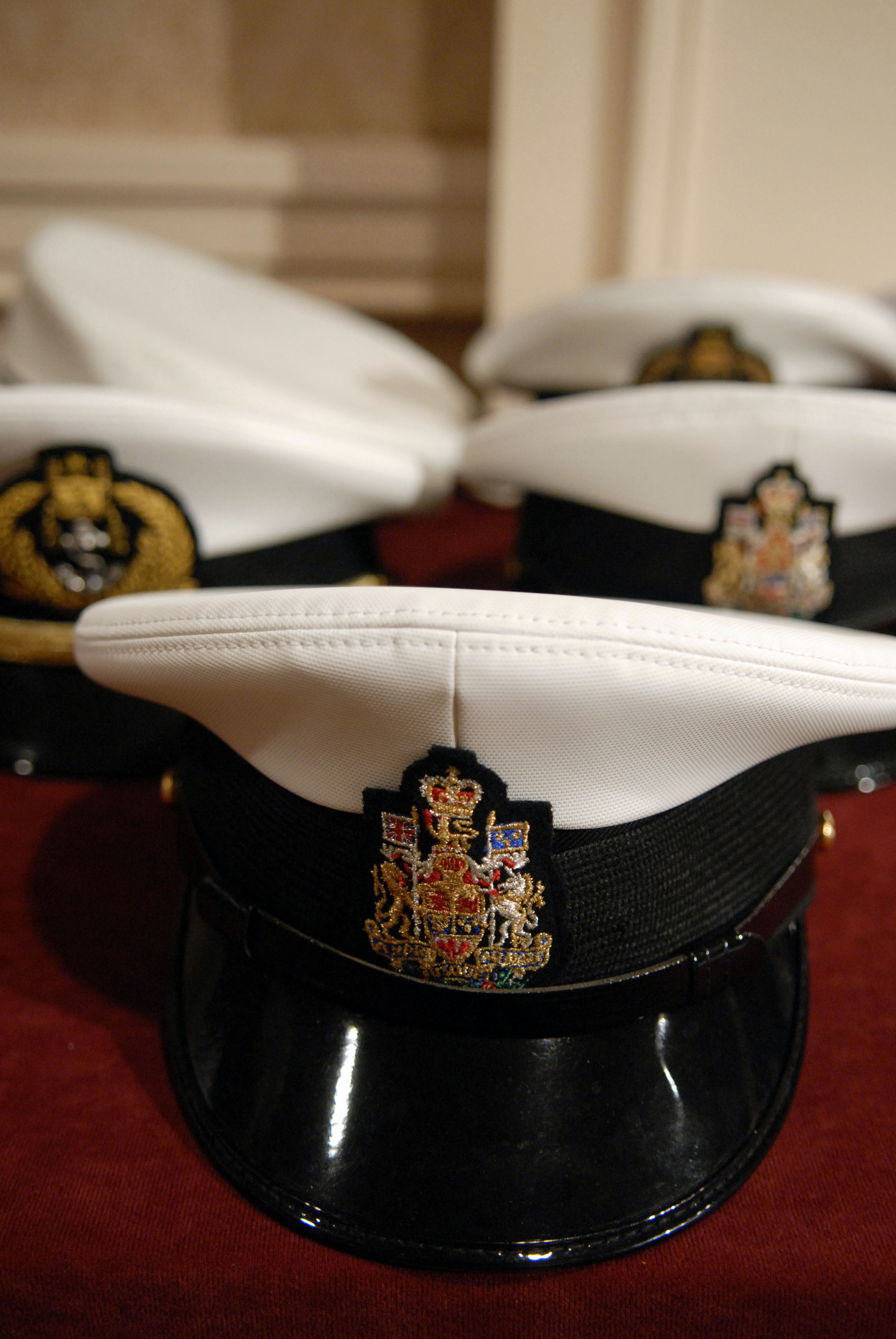
Peaked cap with badge of a senior appointment chief petty officer 1st class of the RCN.

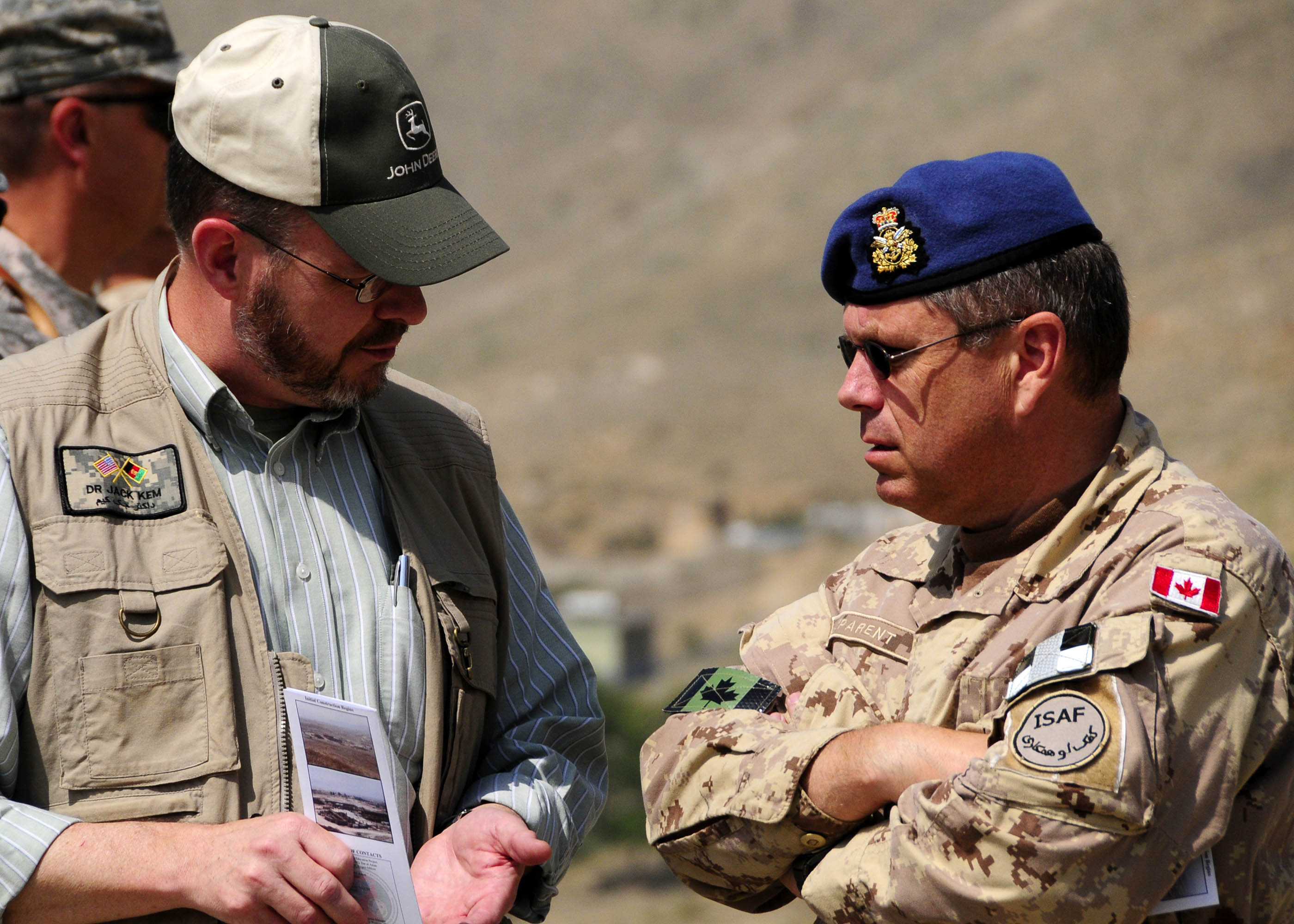
Cap badge of an RCAF general officer on a beret.

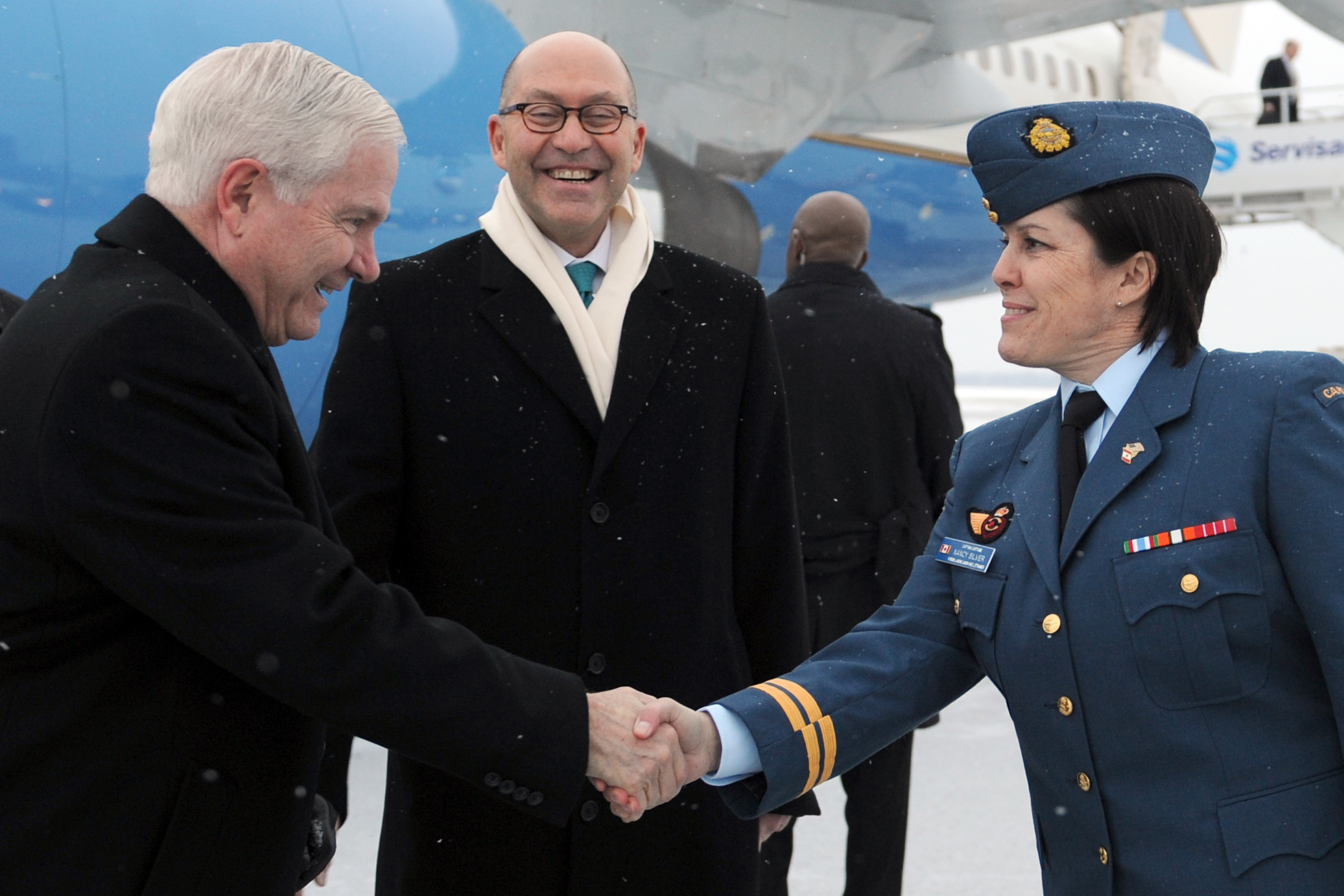
Blue wedge cap of the Royal Canadian Air Force with a cap badge.

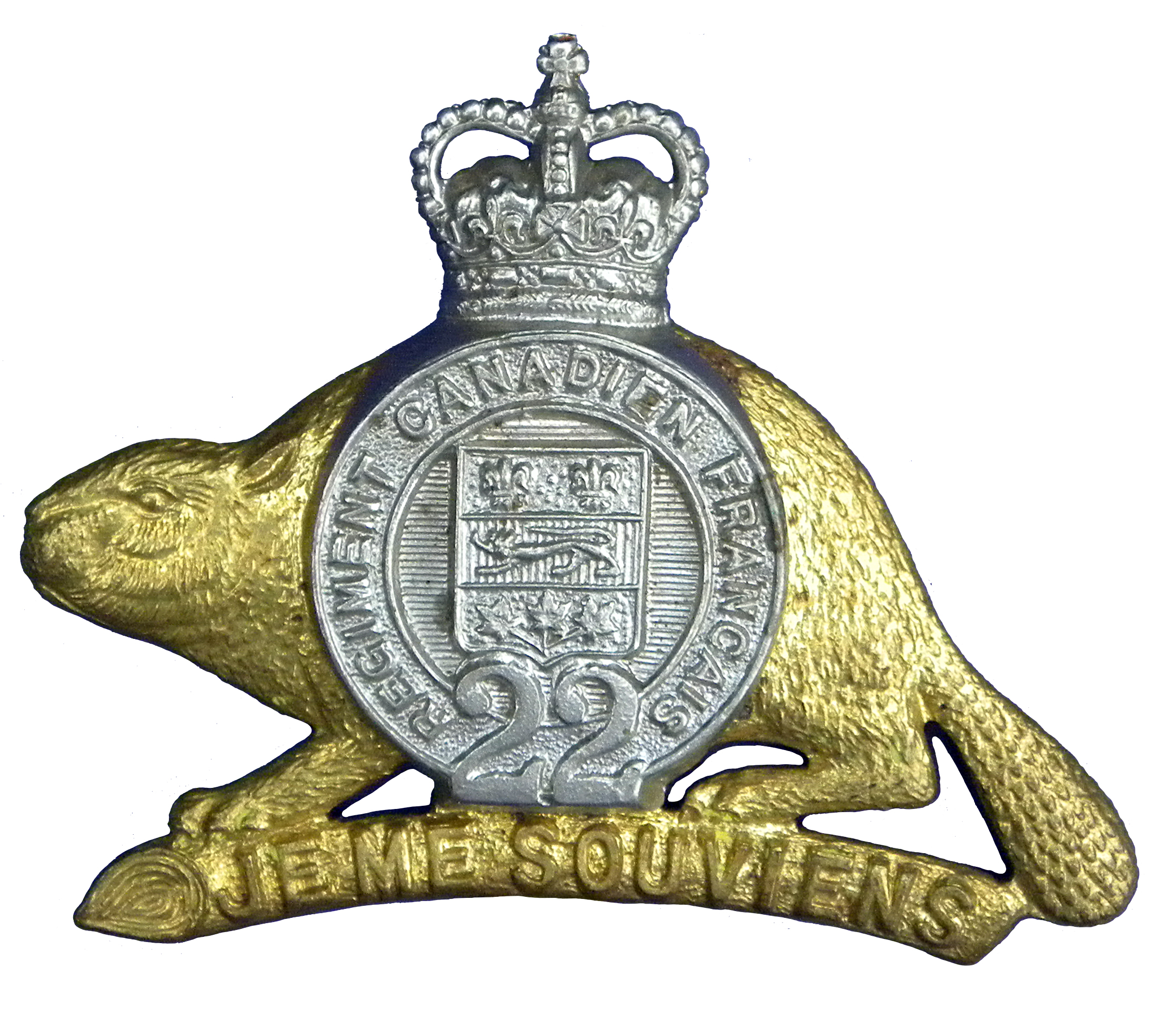
Cap badge of the Royal 22^{e} Régiment of the Canadian Army.

=== United States ===
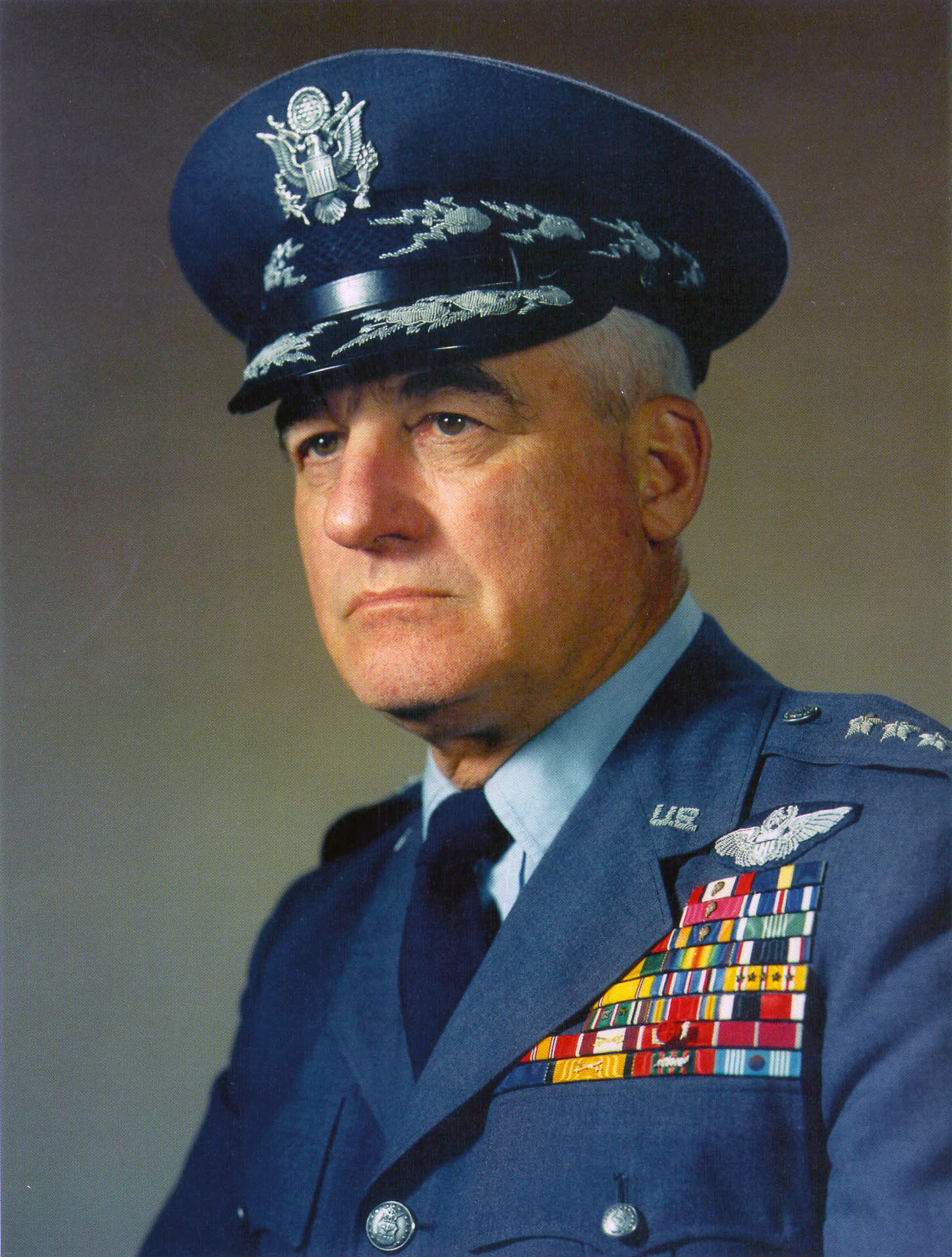
General Nathan Farragut Twining, former chairman of the Joint Chiefs of Staff (1957–1960), wearing an officer's insignia.

==== U.S. Army ====
In the United States Army, a distinctive unit insignia (DUI) is worn on the flash of a beret. For service caps, a gilt eagle device is worn. This is the Great Seal of the United States. In the late nineteenth century, this device on a blue circle was listed as the equivalent of the roundel that appeared on headgear of many European armies.

For officers, a large eagle device is worn. For enlisted men, a small version of the officer's insignia centered on a disk is worn on the front. Warrant officers used to wear a gold eagle device, known as "Eagle Rising," centered on the cap but now wear the same devices as regular officers. For garrison caps, generally the rank insignia is worn, but recent regulations call for the wear of the DUI.

==== U.S. Air Force ====
For U.S. Air Force service caps, a large silver eagle device is worn on the service caps. For enlisted men, a smaller version of the officer's insignia is worn, but enclosed in a ring. The use of the same device is because the U.S. Air Force was once part of the U.S. Army.

== Navies ==
Cap badges used by navies (and merchant mariners) around the world tend to follow the pattern in use by the Royal Navy: an anchor, or occasionally a cockade, surrounded by golden leaf-shaped embroidery and often topped by a crown or another symbol. They may be worn on peaked caps or berets. For petty officers the leaves may be absent or replaced by a ring of golden cable.

=== United Kingdom ===
==== Royal Navy ====
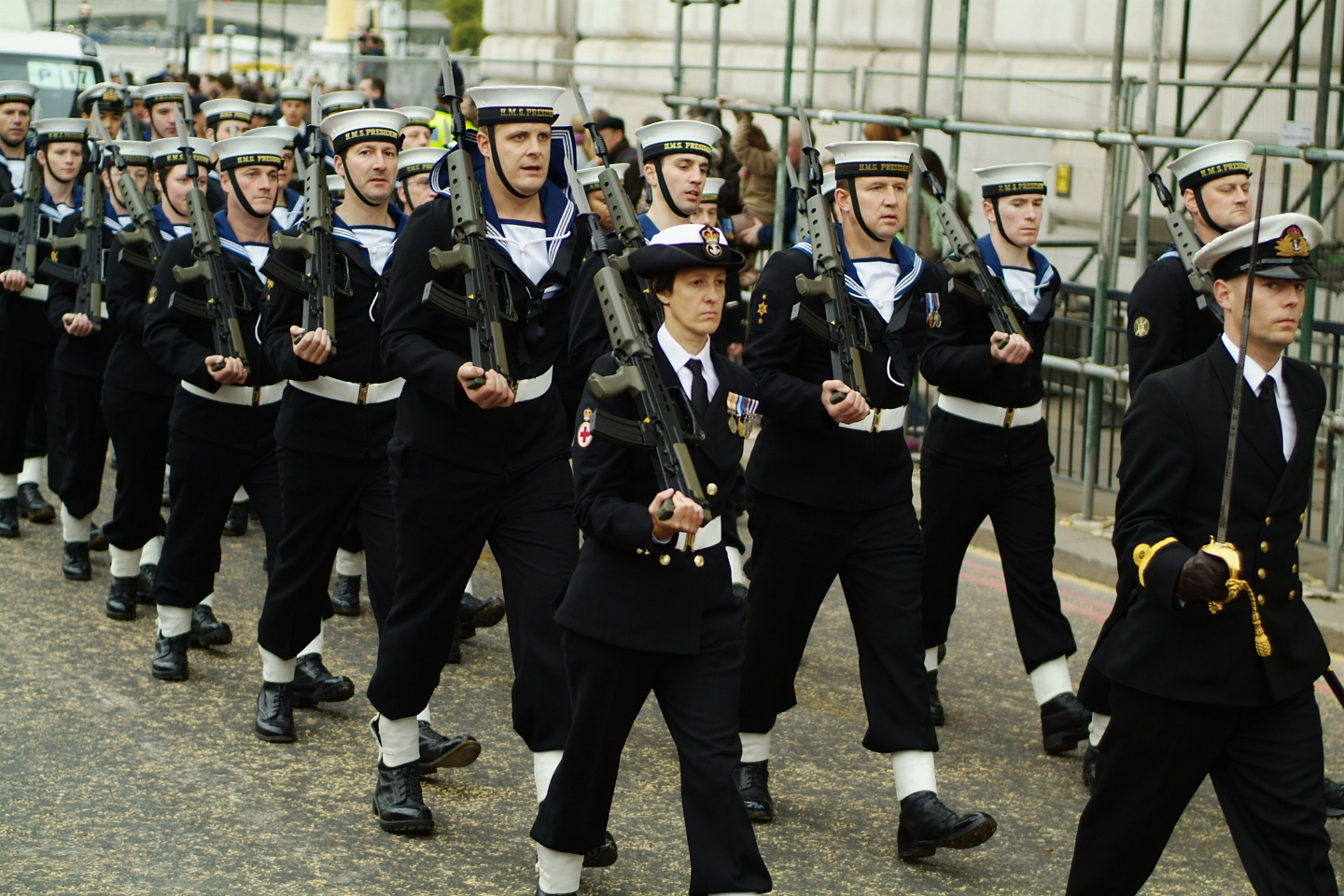
Badge of a petty officer on a hat of female RN personnel, left, with a commissioned officer's badge on a peaked cap, right.

Cap badges in the Royal Navy differ between ranks but have some common features: junior rates (Able Seaman to Leading Seaman) do not wear cap badges, wearing the peakless sailor's cap in number one dress. When wearing a beret, junior ratings will wear a fouled anchor within a gold ring as a beret badge.

Petty Officers wear a silver fouled anchor within a gold circle, with St Edward's Crown above the ring as their cap badge. That of Chief Petty Officers is the same, but with a small laurel wreath around the gold ring. That of warrant officers (both Class I and Class II) has a larger wreath around the anchor, but omits the ring. The laurel wreath around that of commissioned officers is larger still.

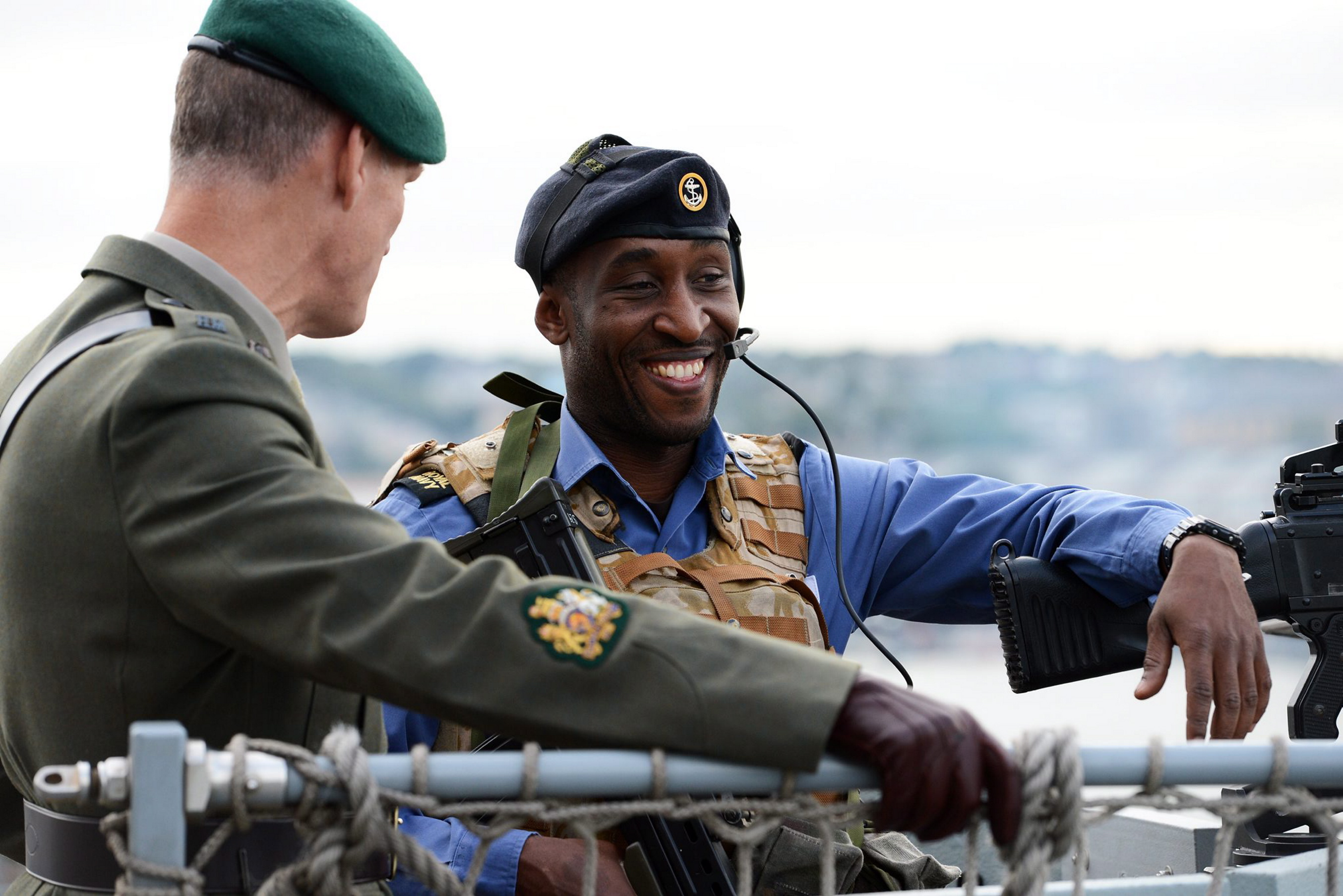
Cap badge of a junior rating, worn on a beret.

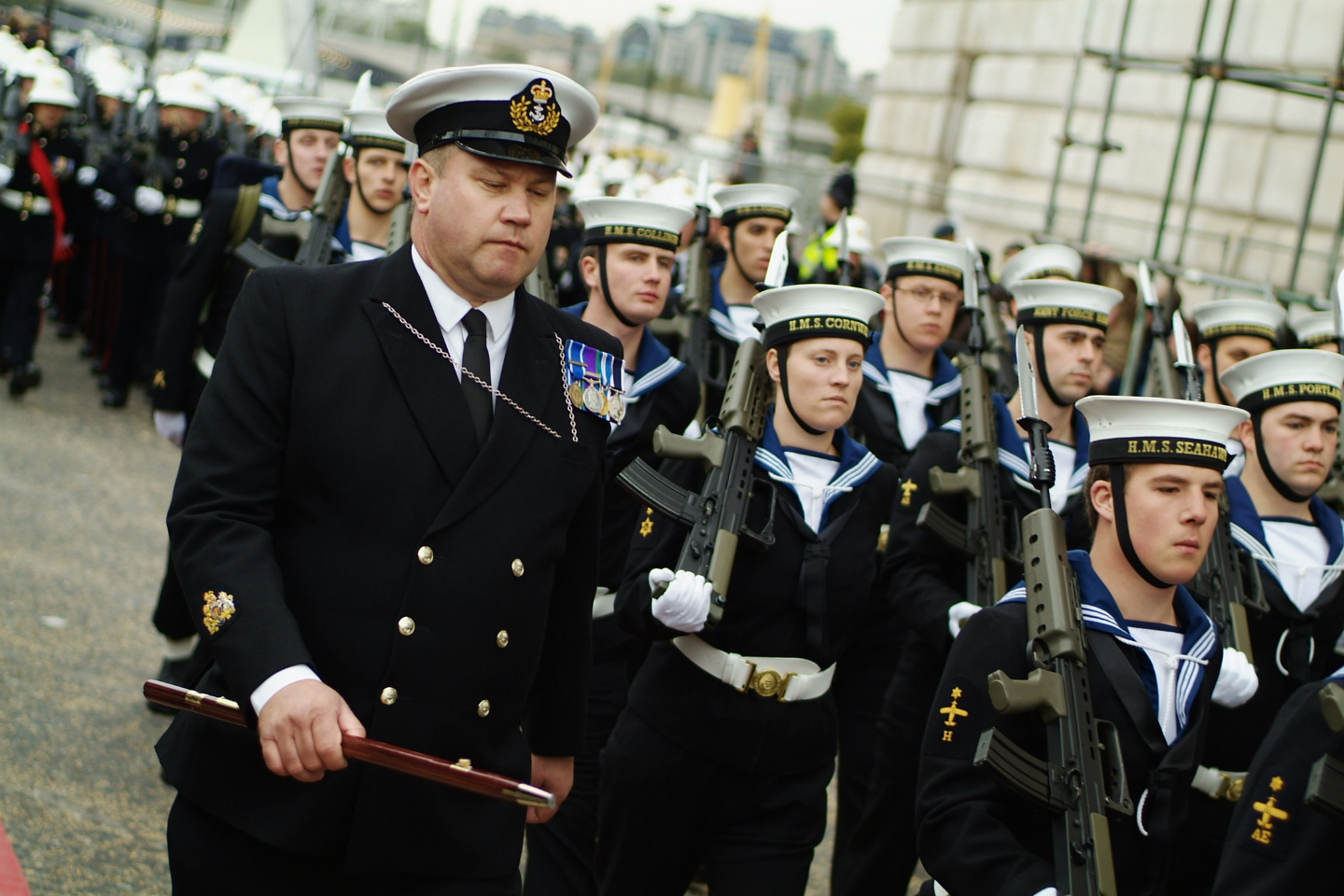
Cap badge of a Royal Navy warrant officer on a peaked cap.

==== Royal Marines ====
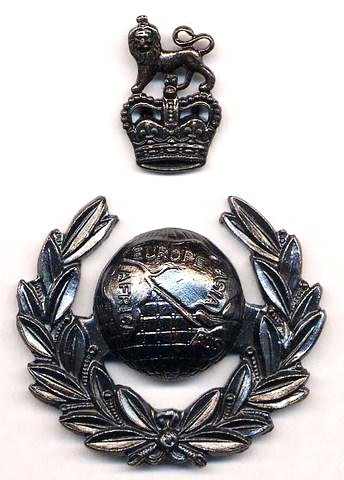
Subdued example of cap badge of officers.

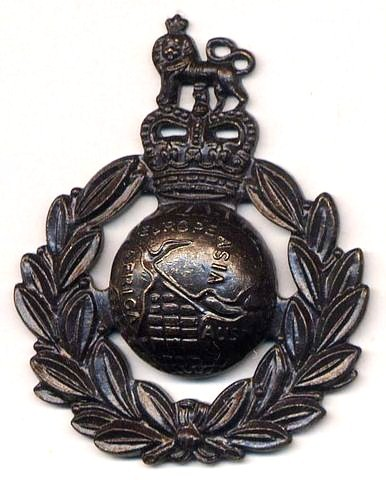
Subdued example of cap badge of other ranks.

Subdued versions of junior officers' (left) and other ranks' (right) Royal Marine cap badges.

In the Royal Marines, cap badges are worn on peaked caps and berets. Those of commissioned officers below the rank of colonel are split in two, the crown and lion atop, but separated from, the globe and laurels. They are brass and silver. Those of other ranks are of the same design but not split in two. They are plain brass.

Blackened or subdued versions of both variants, those of officers and other ranks, are worn on berets, with combat uniforms.

The lion and crown denote a royal regiment, conferred by King George III in 1802. The globe was chosen by King George IV to reflect their successes around the world. The laurels honour their gallantry at the Capture of Belle Île in 1761.

In the Royal Marines Band Service, the Portsmouth band and CTCRM band have different cap badges from the rest of the Corps. The SBS also has its own cap badge.

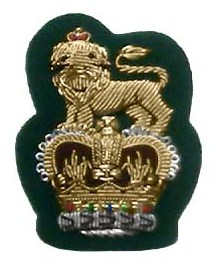
Cap badge of RM colonels and brigadiers.

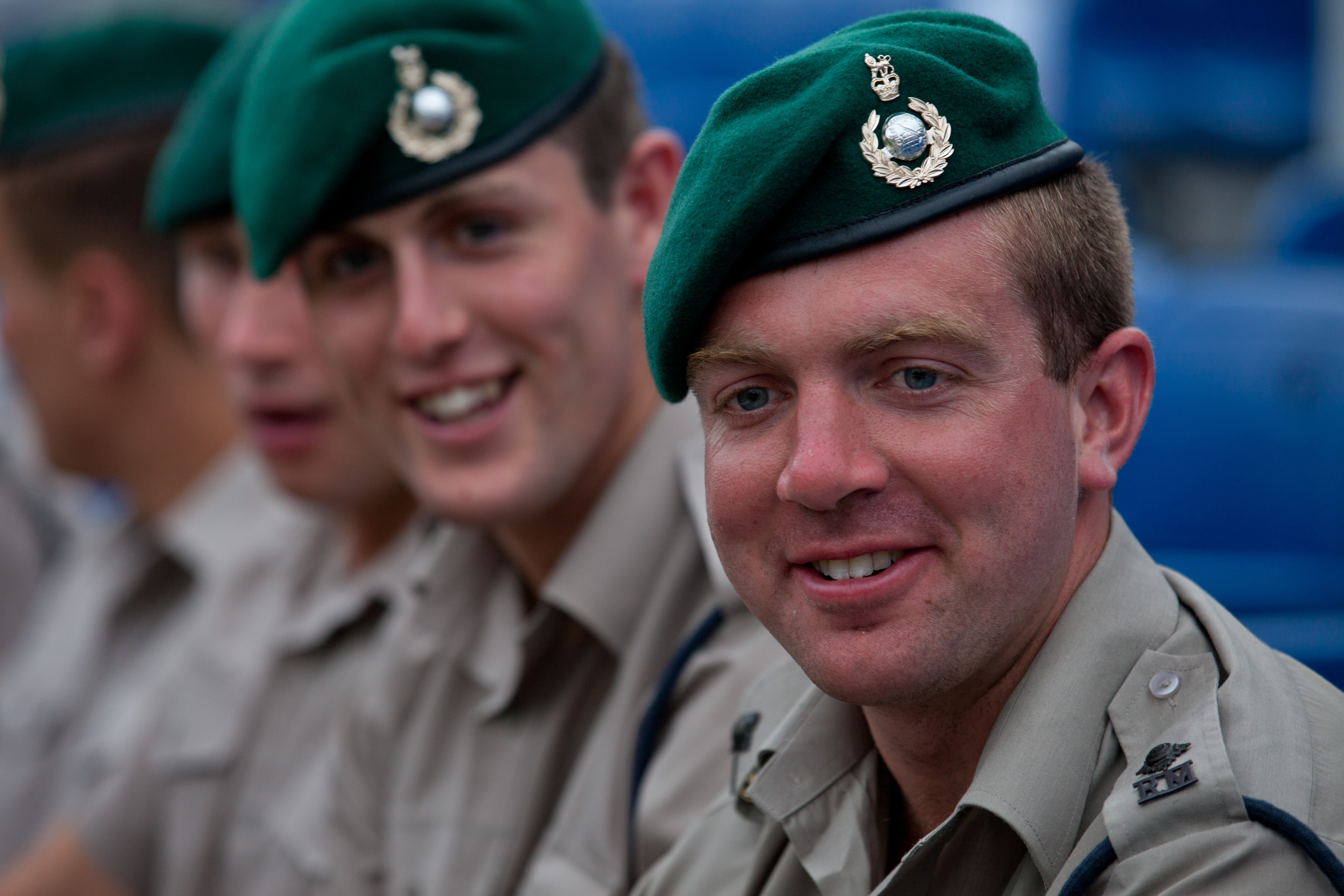
Brass and silver cap badges of Royal Marines junior officers.

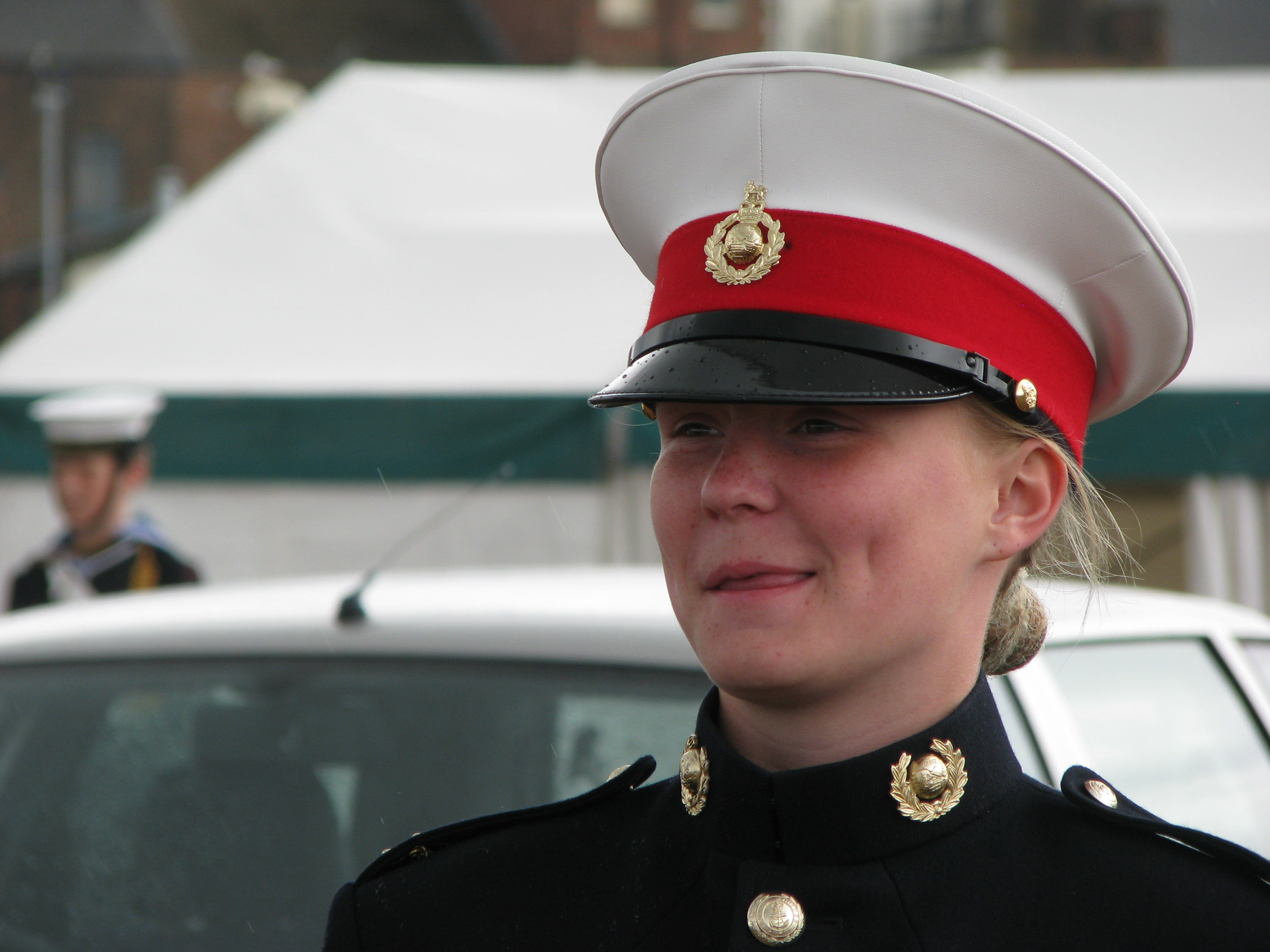
Plain brass cap badge of RM other ranks. This version is also worn by Royal Marines Cadets of the rank of Colour Sergeant or below.

=== United States ===
==== Navy and Coast Guard ====
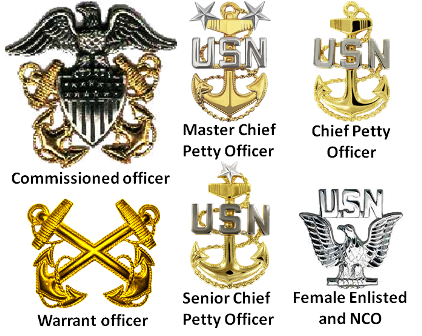
U.S. Navy current and former cap devices.

The main exceptions to the Royal Navy pattern are the United States Navy and the United States Coast Guard, which once followed this pattern, but changed after the American Civil War to their current designs. The Navy has crossed anchors behind the eagle and shield for commissioned officers, while the Coast Guard uses a single large anchor held in the eagle's claws on its commissioned officers' caps; officers in both branches wear a miniature version of the commissioned officer insignia on the left side of the garrison cap, with rank insignia worn on the wearer's right. Chief petty officers and above in both the Navy and the Coast Guard have a larger version of their collar insignia as their cap badge for the combination cover and a miniature version worn on the garrison cap; petty officer first class and below in both services wear a full-sized rank insignia on the garrison cap. Junior enlisted coastguards wear a combination cap badge featuring a gold disc in front of two silver crossed anchors, while junior enlisted sailors of both genders wear a sailor cap without any insignia. Midshipmen at the US Naval Academy and the US Merchant Marine Academy and in the Naval Reserve Officers Training Corps (NROTC) wear a single upright fouled anchor on combination and garrison caps, while cadets at the US Coast Guard Academy wear a single fouled anchor surmounted by a silver five-pointed star with one point facing down.

==== Marine Corps ====
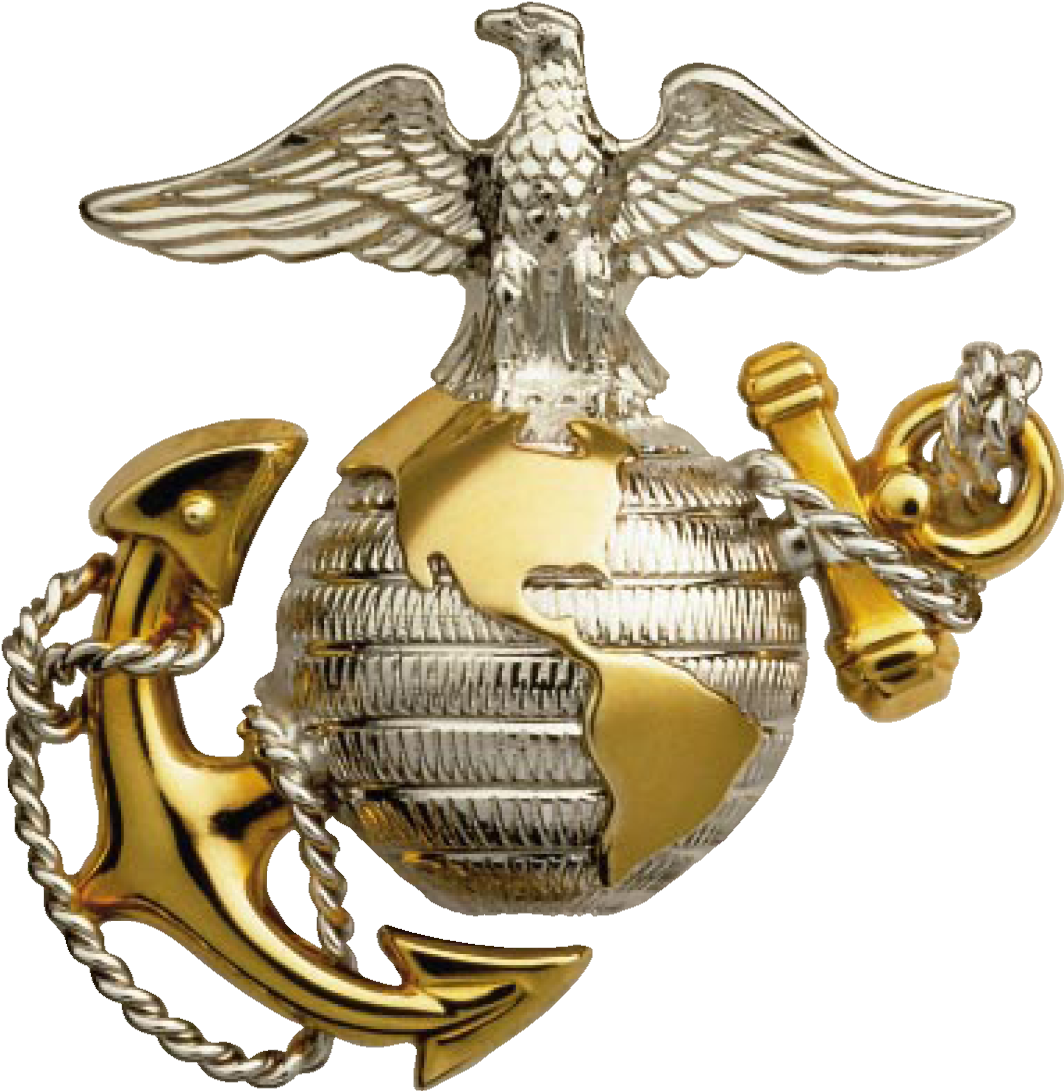
Officer dress

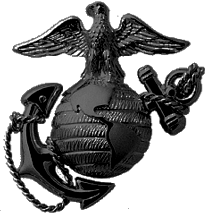
Officer service

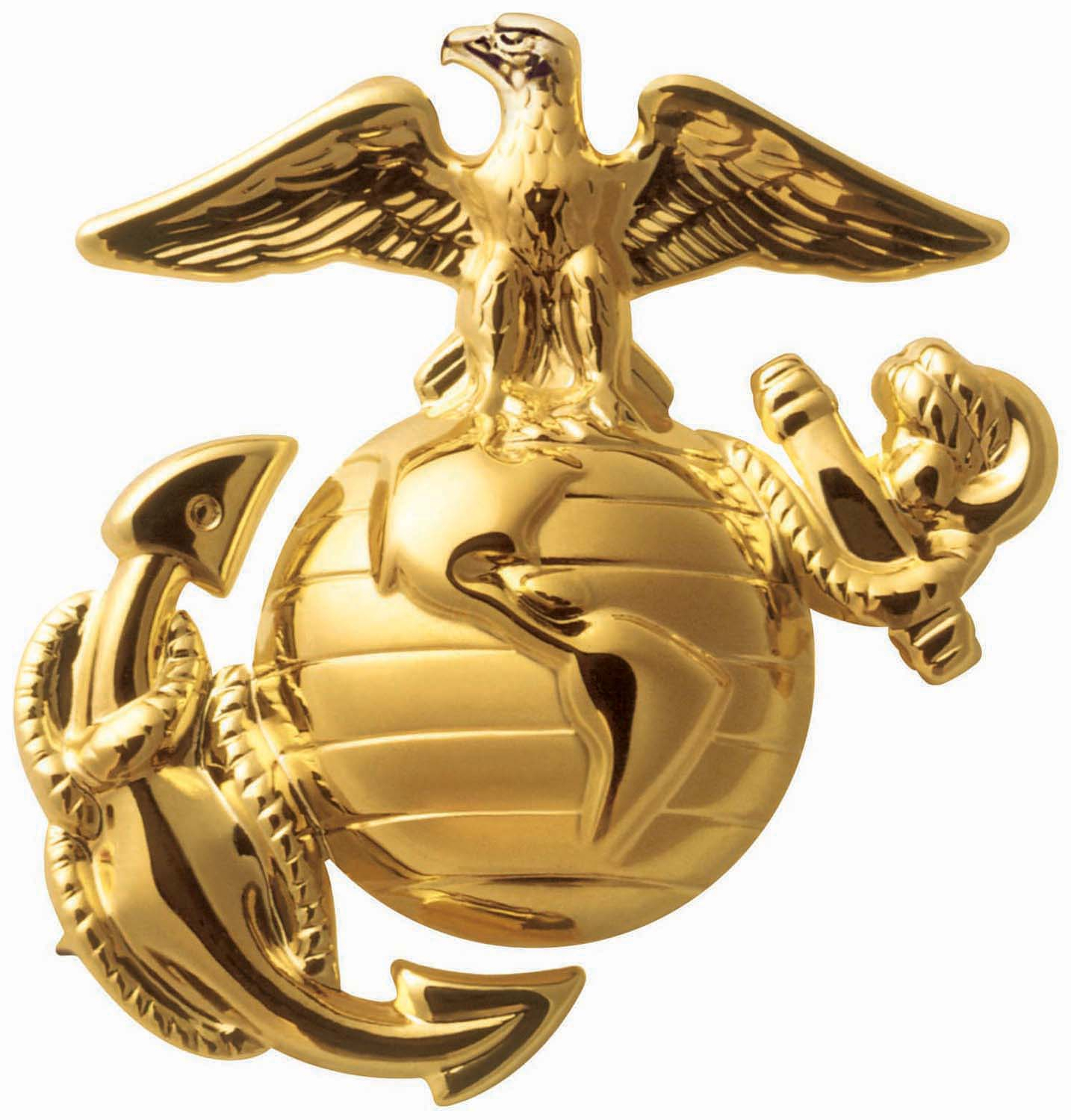
Enlisted dress

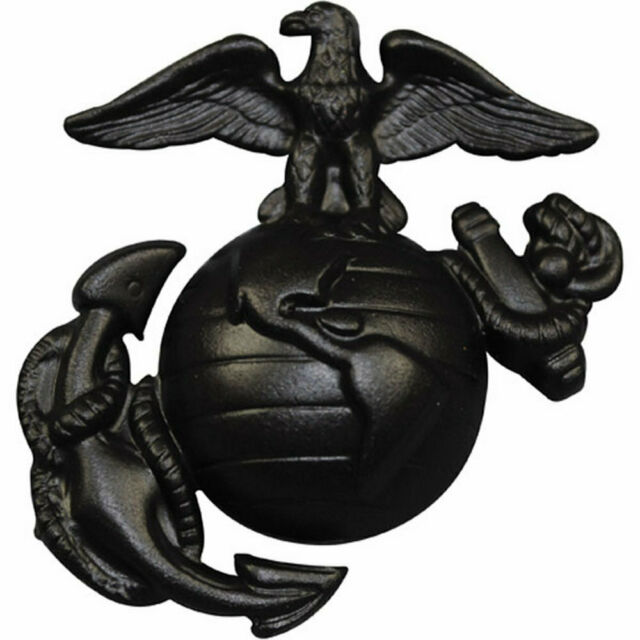
Enlisted service

Peaked cap devices of US Marine Corps Eagle, Globe, and Anchor

United States Marines wear the Eagle, Globe, and Anchor as their cap device: gilt and silver for officers and gold for enlisted on blue dress uniforms, and subdued for all ranks on service and utility uniforms. Marine-option midshipmen at the US Naval Academy wear the same cap device as other midshipmen, while NROTC Marine-option midshipmen wear the enlisted-dress Eagle, Globe, and Anchor on all their uniforms instead of an anchor.

== International forces ==
Badges are worn on berets of international military and peacekeeping forces.

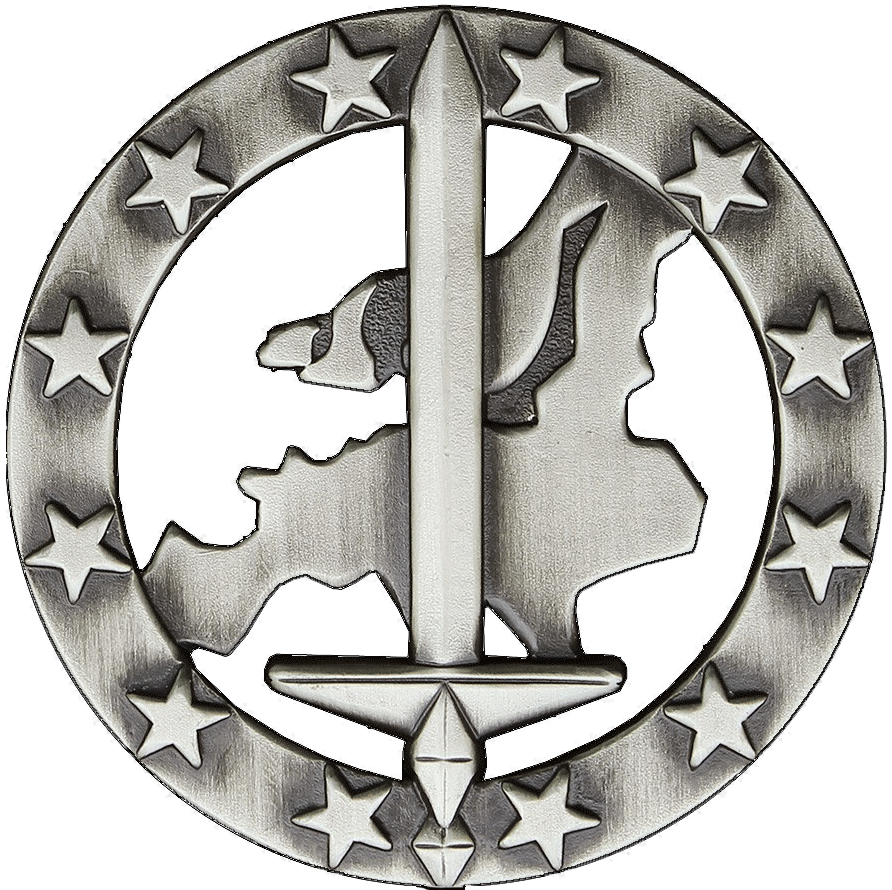
Cap badge of Eurocorps.

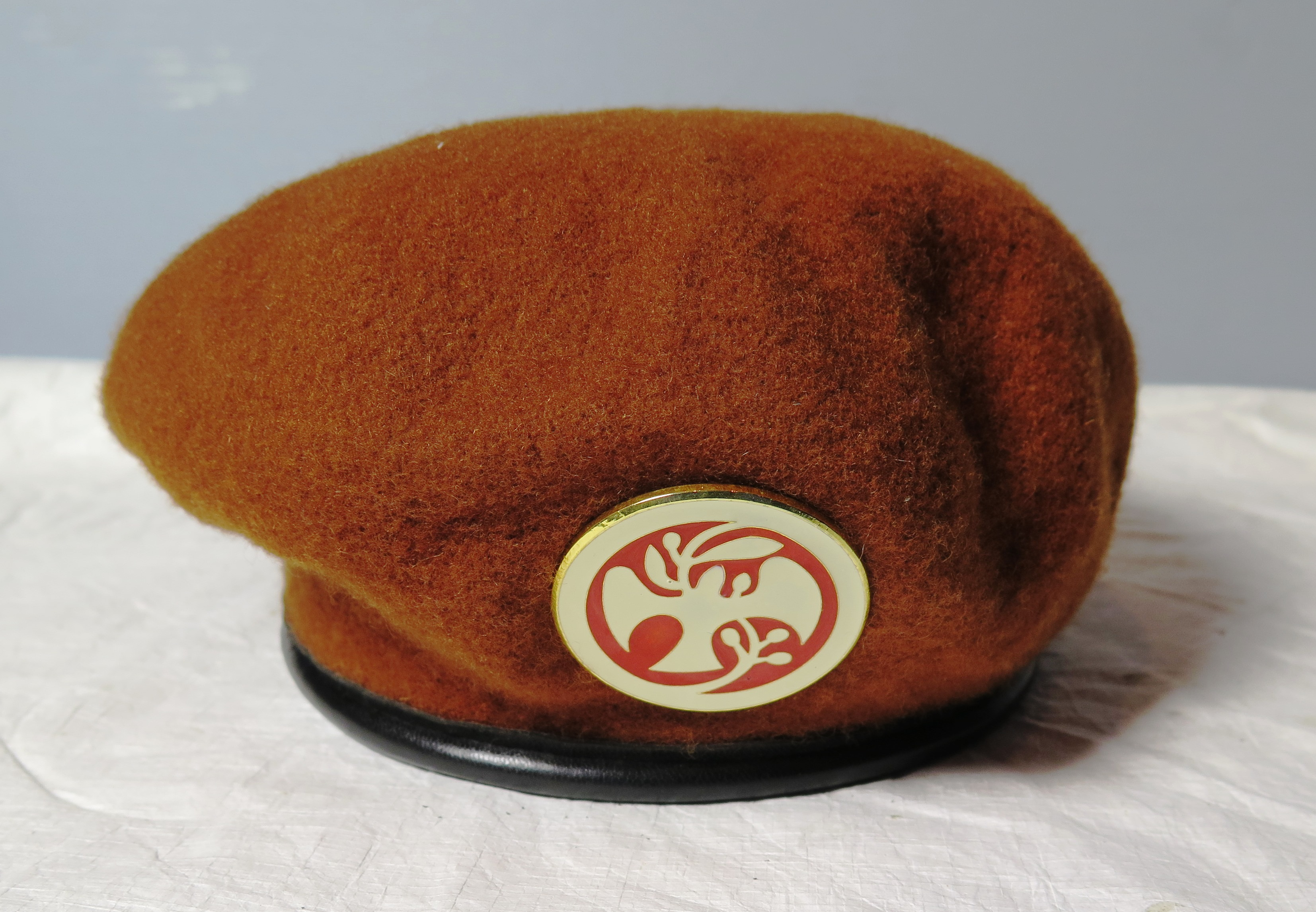
Beret of the Multinational Force and Observers with a metal and enamel badge.

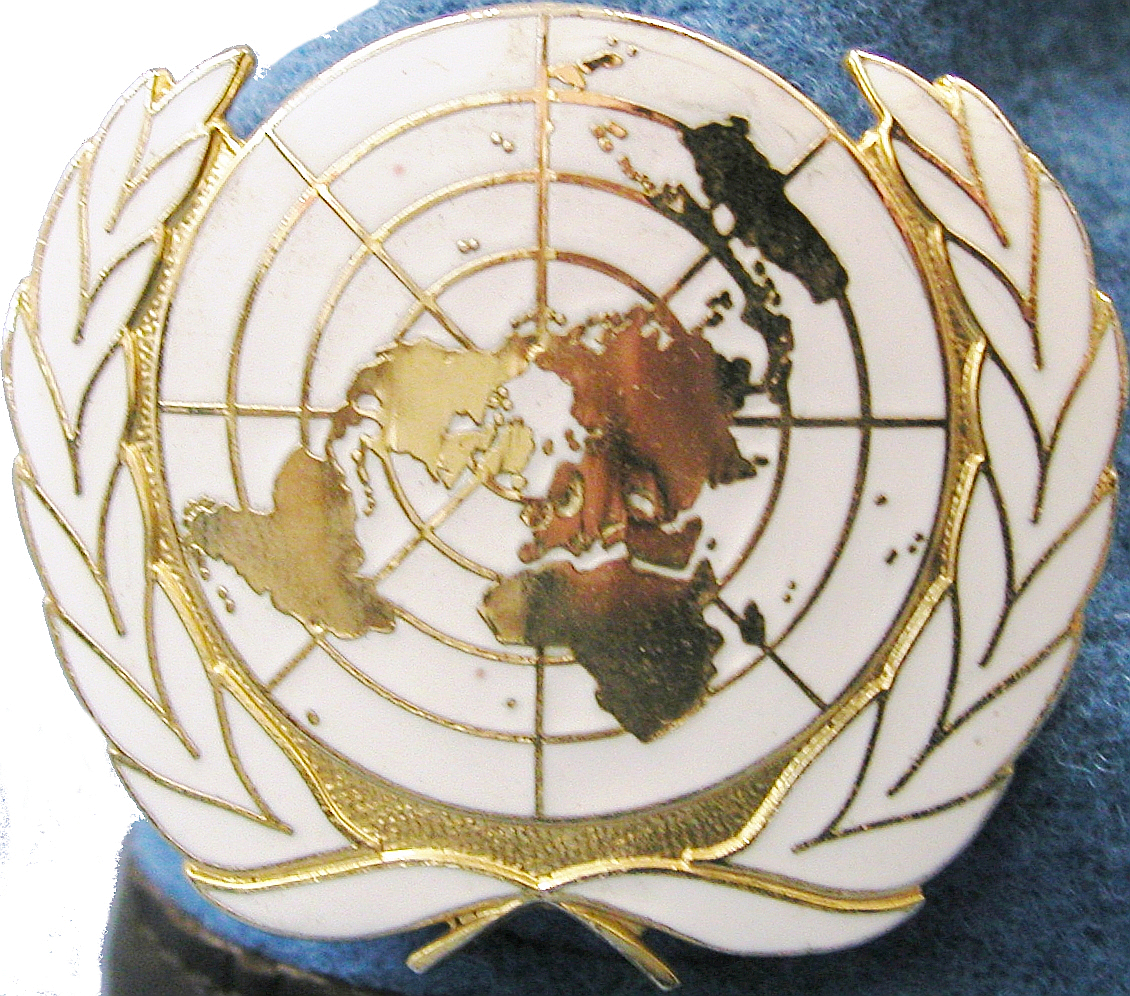
Cap badge of United Nations peacekeeping forces on a blue beret.

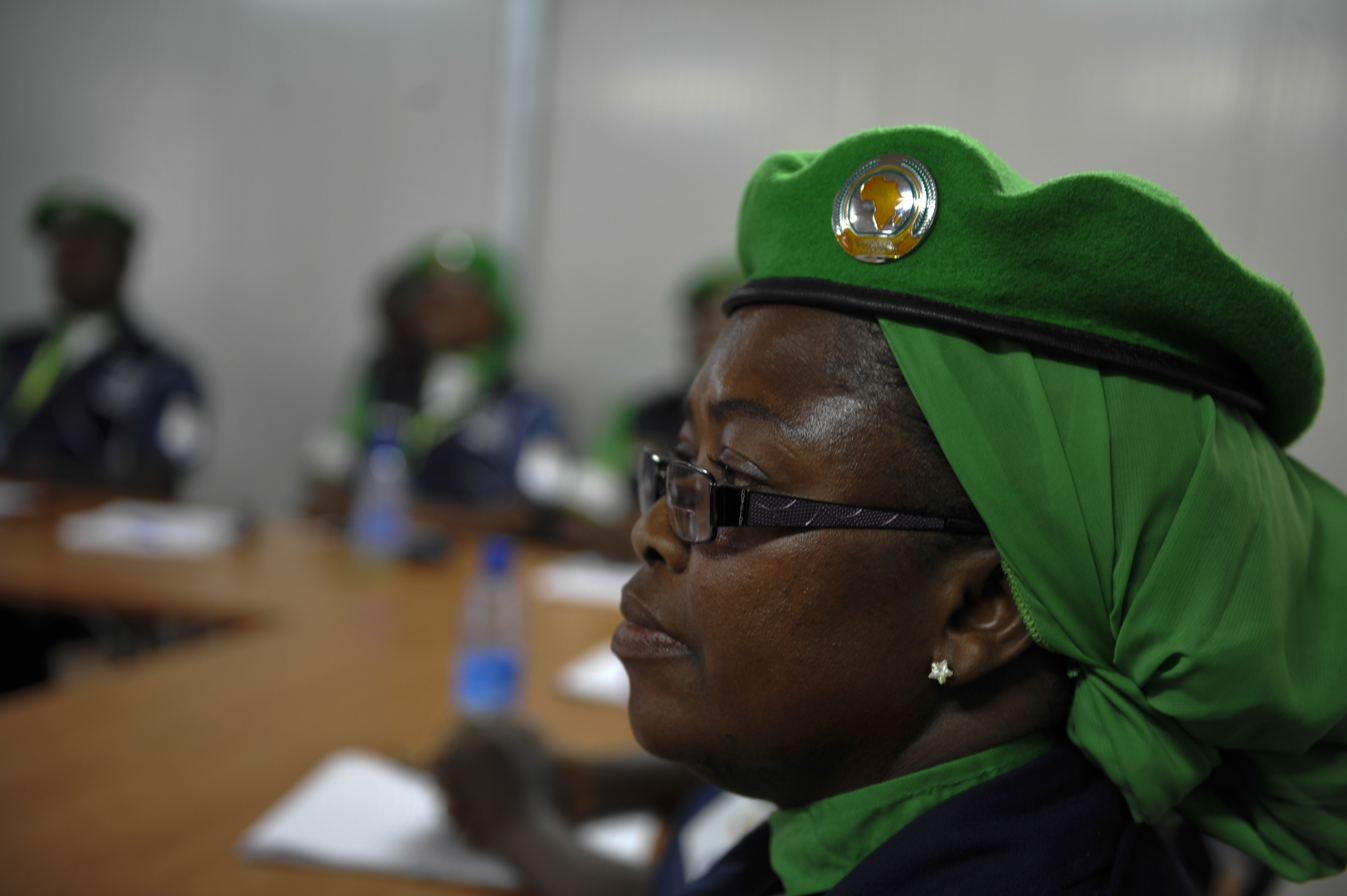
Cap badge of the former African Union peacekeeping forces.

== Police ==
The Royal Canadian Mounted Police, as well as provincial and municipal police forces, utilize forage caps and metal cap badges.

=== United Kingdom ===
Where the majority of British police forces have silver-coloured cap badges, those of the City of London Police are brass. They are in the form of each force's crest and include the name of that force.

Different badge designs are also worn on the headgear of police community support officers.

== Civilian organisations ==
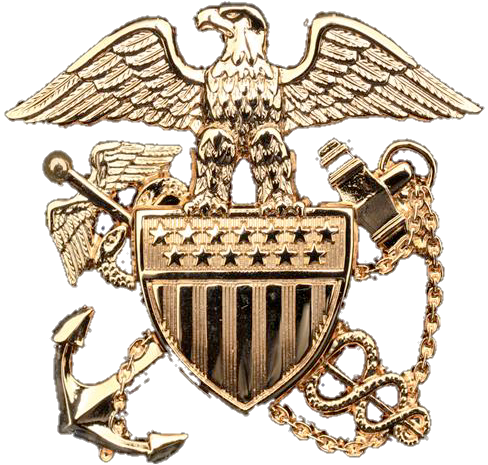
United States Public Health Service Commissioned Corps combination cap device.

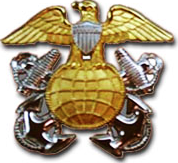
National Oceanic and Atmospheric Administration Commissioned Officer Corps combination cap device.

Peaked cap devices of the unarmed uniformed services of the United States.

Cap badges are worn by a variety of other organisations:

In the United Kingdom, cadets of the Community Cadet Forces, Combined Cadet Force and Volunteer Cadet Corps generally wear cap badges of the armed forces with which they are affiliated. Cadets of the Sea Cadet Corps and Air Training Corps wear a badge with a unique design.

== See also ==
- Cockade
- Irish Defence Forces cap badge
