= TIF (disambiguation) =

TIF or Tag Image File Format is a file format for storing images.

TIF may also refer to:

- Ta’if Regional Airport, IATA code TIF, in Ta'if, Saudi Arabia
- Tax increment financing, a public financing method
- Tokyo Idol Festival, a Japanese female idol music festival
- Transport Innovation Fund, an English transport funding mechanism
- Türkiye İzcilik Federasyonu, the Scouting and Guiding Federation of Turkey
- Thessaloniki International Fair, a trade fair in Thessaloniki, Greece
- Transoral incisionless fundoplication, a medical treatment for gastroesophageal reflux disease (GERD)

== See also ==
- TIFF (disambiguation)
- TIFFE (disambiguation)
