= Tiffy =

Tiffy may refer to:

- Hawker Typhoon, British fighter bomber aircraft, as "Tiffie"
- Timothy Findley (1930–2002), Canadian novelist and playwright nicknamed "Tiffy"
- Michael Torrens-Spence (1914–2001), Second World War Royal Navy Fleet Air Arm pilot nicknamed "Tiffy"
- Tiffy Gerhardt, a character from the television show The Unit
- Tiffy, a pink female bird character in Sesamstraße, the German-language version of Sesame Street
- Tiffy, in the 2013 German–Austrian film Zur Sache, Macho!
- Tiffy Tootle, a character in the animated series Willa's Wild Life
- The Tiffy, armed-forces artificer

== See also ==
- Tiffy Army FC, a Cambodian association football club
- "Tiffy Time", a catchphrase used by American professional wrestler Tiffany Stratton
- Tiffy Titan, Amorphophallus titanum, flowering plant
- Tiffy Template, a template for the blind to identify Indian currency notes, created and named after Tiffany Brar
- Tifi (disambiguation)
