= Rates and insignia of the ratings of the Royal Navy =

In the British Royal Navy, only commissioned officers and marines have a 'rank', with sailors instead assigned a 'rate' and called 'ratings'. The equivalent term in the British Army, Royal Marines and the Royal Air Force is 'other ranks' and in the United States is 'enlisted ranks'. Rate insignia consists of a combination of symbols, including fouled anchors, the Imperial Crown, laurel wreaths, buttons and the Royal Arms.

== Insignia ==
=== Royal Navy ===
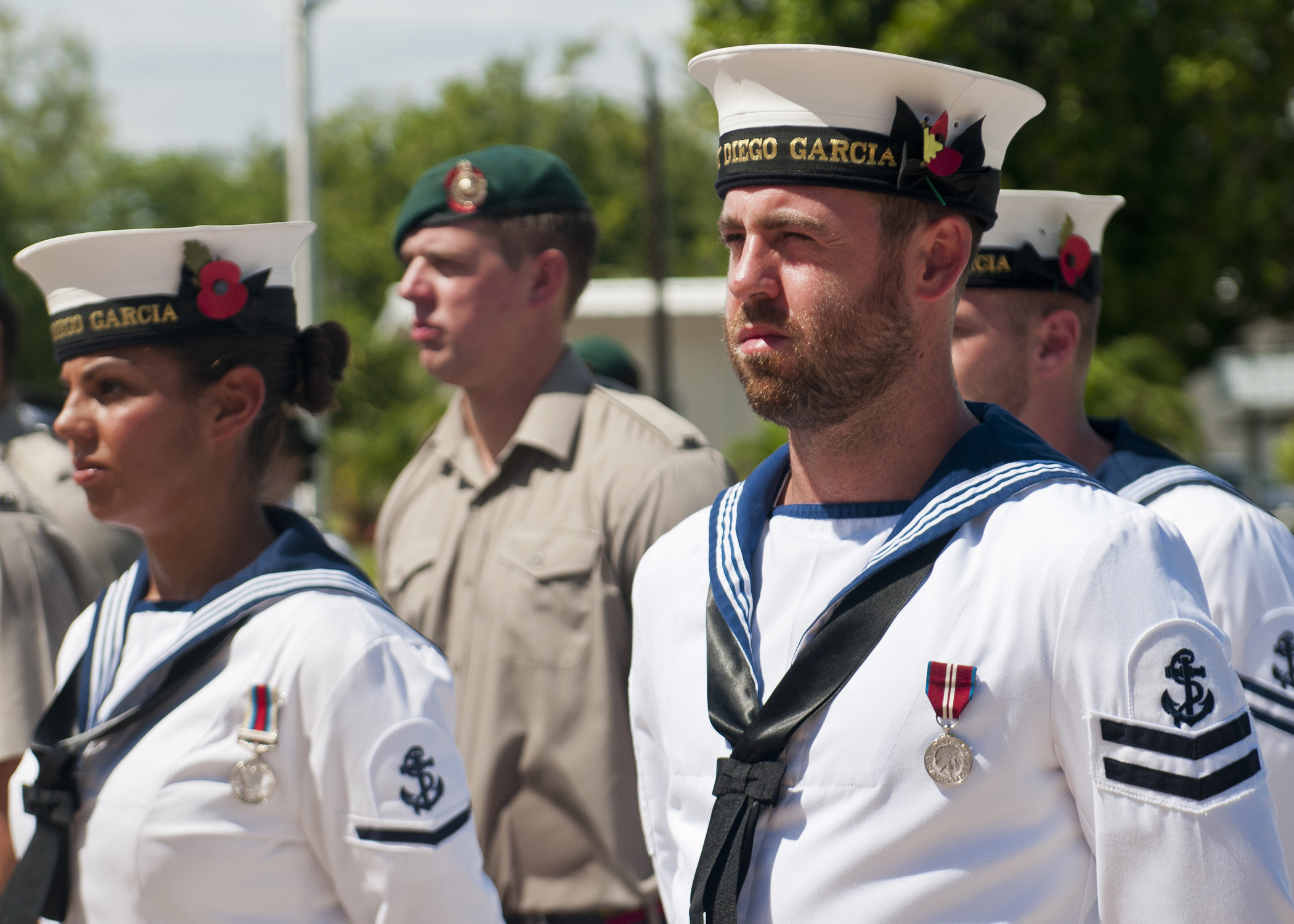
Royal Navy ratings wearing rank insignia above good conduct badges on the left arm.

Rate insignia of the ratings of the Royal Navy
Rate group	Warrant officers		Senior ratings			Junior ratings	
NATO code	OR-9	OR-8	OR-7	OR-6	OR-5	OR-4	OR-2
Shoulder insignia							
Arm insignia							No insignia
Rate	Warrant officer 1	Warrant officer 2	Chief petty officer	Petty officer		Leading rating	Able rating
Abbreviation	WO1	WO2	CPO	PO		LH	AB

All ratings may be awarded Good Conduct Badges (GCB), although they are only worn by petty officers and below, under their rate insignia on the left arm. They are of a 'V' shape and are similar in appearance to the chevrons worn by NCOs in the Royal Marines, British Army and the Royal Air Force, but in the Royal Navy they do not denote rank or rate. A set of one indicates 4 years of good conduct, two for 8 years and three for 12 years.

=== Royal Marines ===
Rank insignia of the other ranks of the Royal Marines
Rank group	Warrant officers			Senior NCOs			Junior NCOs		Marines
NATO code	OR-9		OR-8	OR-7	OR-6	OR-5	OR-4	OR-3	OR-2
Insignia									No insignia
Typical appointment	Corps regimental sergeant major	Regimental sergeant major	Regimental quartermaster sergeant / company sergeant major	Company quartermaster sergeant					
Rank	Warrant officer class 1		Warrant officer class 2	Colour sergeant	Sergeant		Corporal	Lance corporal	Marine
Abbreviation	WO1		WO2	CSgt	Sgt		Cpl	LCpl	Mne

==== Royal Marines band service ====
NATO code	OR-9	OR-8	OR-7		OR-6	OR-5	OR-4	OR-3	OR-2	OR-1
Royal Marines Band Service
Royal Marines Band Service	Warrant officer class 1	Warrant officer class 2, Bandmaster	Drum major Bugle major	Colour sergeant bugler Band colour sergeant	Sergeant bugler Band sergeant		Corporal bugler Band corporal	Lance corporal bugler Band lance corporal		Musician

== Branch badges ==
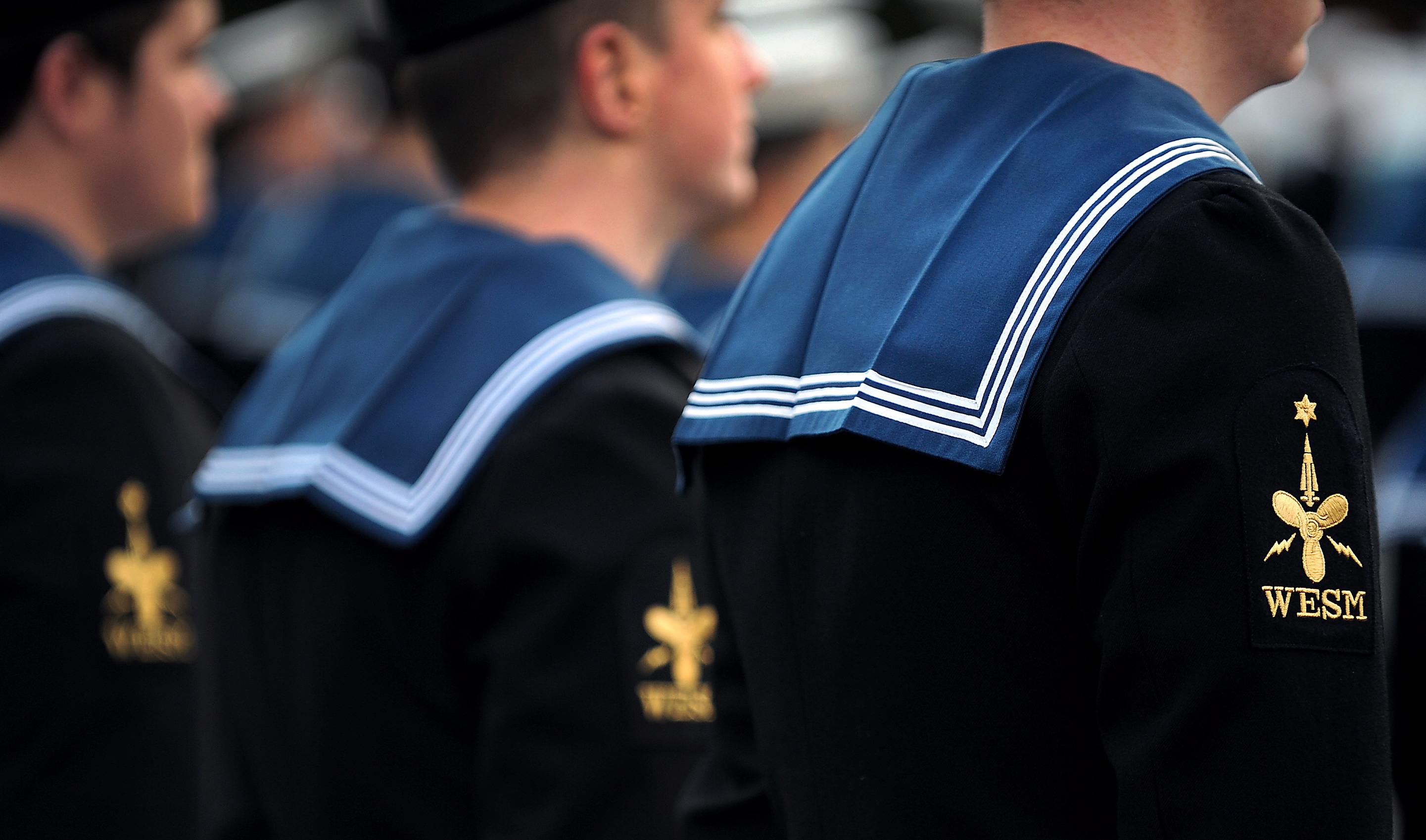
Royal Navy ratings wearing branch badges on the right arm

Ratings in the Royal Navy wear branch badges (colloquially known as trade badges or 'tiffs') on the right sleeve to indicate a specific job, whilst rate insignia is worn on the left sleeve. Branches in the Royal Navy are listed below. Branch sub-specialisations are denoted with an abbreviation on the branch badge. Ratings in the Marine Engineering and Medical branches may obtain 'dolphins' (qualify for the Royal Navy Submarine Service). Some personnel have an additional option to pass the All Arms Commando Course and serve attached to the Royal Marines.

Branch badges
Branch		Specialisation	Sub-specialisation	Badge letters	Badge
Warfare		Seamanship (SEA)		SEA	
Warfare		Information Warfare (IW)	Above Water Warfare Tactical	AWT	
Warfare		Information Warfare (IW)	Electronic Warfare	EW	
Warfare		Information Warfare (IW)	Intelligence	INT	
Warfare		Information Warfare (IW)	Cryptologic Technician	CT	
Warfare		Information Warfare (IW)	Meteorology & Oceanography	IW METOC	
Warfare		Warfare	Above Water Warfare Weapons	AWW	
Warfare		Warfare	Underwater Warfare	UW	
Warfare		Warfare	Mine Warfare	MW	
Warfare		Warfare	Hydrography	H	
Warfare		Warfare Submarine	Sonar Submarine	SSM	
Warfare		Warfare Submarine	Tactical Submarine	TSM	
Warfare		Photographer	Photographer	PHOT	
Warfare		Diver (MCD)	Diver	D	
Warfare		Coxswain Submariner (Coxn SM)			
Logistics		Logistics (Logs)	Catering Services	CS	
Logistics		Logistics (Logs)	Supply Chain	SC	
Logistics		Logistics (Logs)	Writer	W	
Logistics		Logistics (Logs)	Royal Navy Family & People Support (FPS)	RNW	
Logistics		Physical Trainers (PTI)			
Logistics		Royal Navy Police (RNP)			
Medical and Dental		Medical	Radiographer	R	
Medical and Dental		Medical	Laboratory	L	
Medical and Dental		Medical	Pharmacy Dispenser	PD	
Medical and Dental		Medical	Supply Chain	SC	
Medical and Dental		Dental	Dental Hygienist	DH (Note: Letters inside circle)	
Medical and Dental		Dental	Dental Surgery Assistant	DSA	
Medical and Dental		Dental	Quarters Assistant	QA	
Medical and Dental		Queen Alexandra's Royal Naval Nursing Service (QARNNS)			
Engineering	Marine Engineering	Marine Engineering (General Service) (MEGS)	Mechanical	ML	
Engineering	Marine Engineering	Marine Engineering (General Service) (MEGS)	Electrical	EL	
Engineering	Marine Engineering	Marine Engineering (Submarine Service) (MESM)	Mechanical	MESM	
Engineering	Marine Engineering	Marine Engineering (Submarine Service) (MESM)	Electrical	MESM	
Engineering	Weapons Engineering	Weapons Engineering (General Service) (WEGS)	Weapons	W	
Engineering	Weapons Engineering	Weapons Engineering (General Service) (WEGS)	Communication and Information Systems	CIS	
Engineering	Weapons Engineering	Weapons Engineering (General Service) (WEGS)	Sensors	S	
Engineering	Weapons Engineering	Weapons Engineering (Submarine Service) (WESM)	Strategic Weapon Systems	WESM	
Engineering	Weapons Engineering	Weapons Engineering (Submarine Service) (WESM)	Tactical Weapon Systems	WESM	
Engineering	Weapons Engineering	Weapons Engineering (Submarine Service) (WESM)	Communication & Information Systems	WESM	
Engineering	Fleet Air Arm	Air Engineering Technician (AET)	Avionics	AV	
Engineering	Fleet Air Arm	Air Engineering Technician (AET)	Mechanical	M	
Engineering	Fleet Air Arm	Air Engineering Technician (AET)	Air Engineering	AE	
Engineering	Fleet Air Arm	Survival Equipment Technician (SET)		SE	
Engineering	Fleet Air Arm	Aircraft Handler (AH)		H	
Engineering	Fleet Air Arm	Aircraft Controller (AC)		AC	

=== Qualifications ===
Royal Navy branch badges in 1944
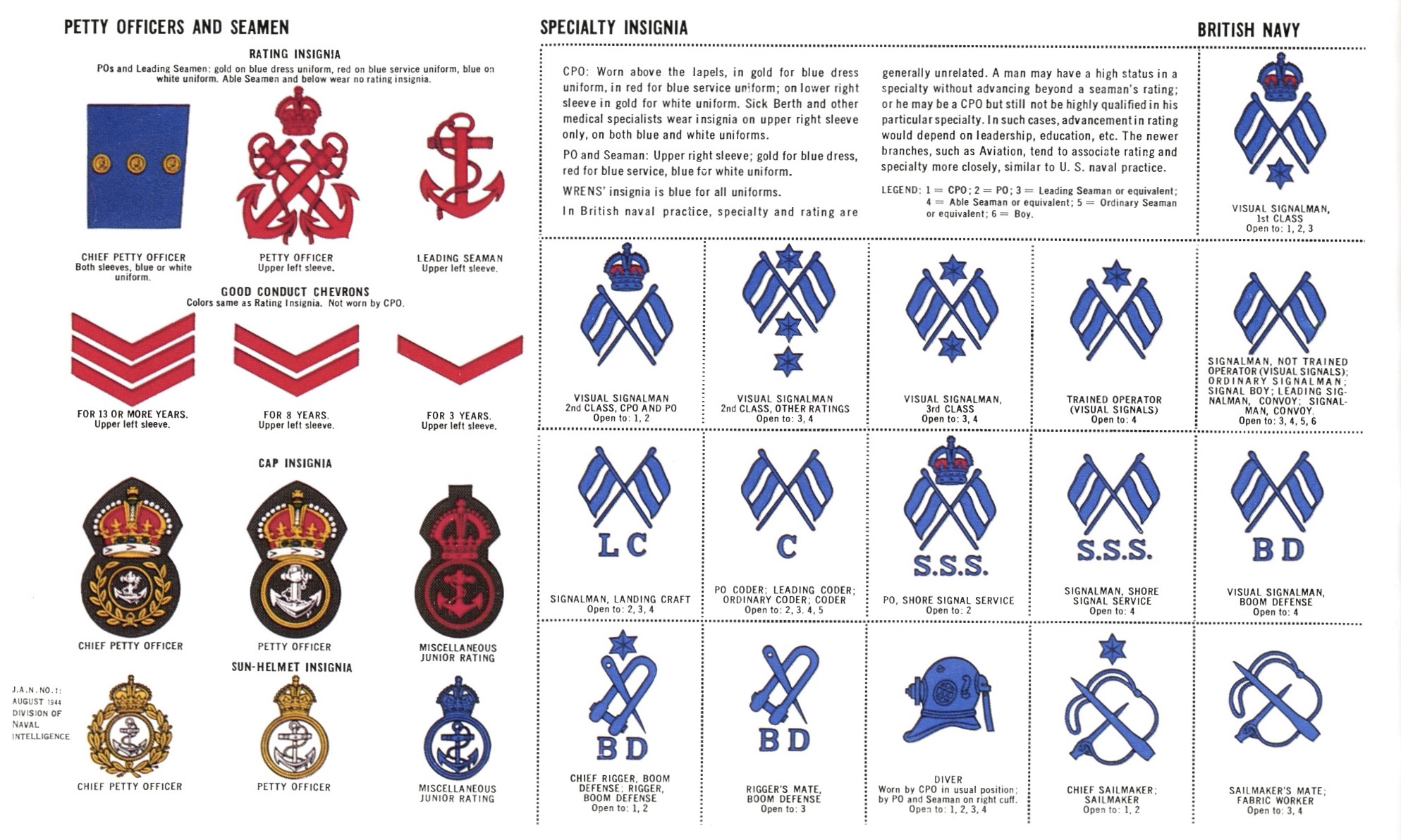
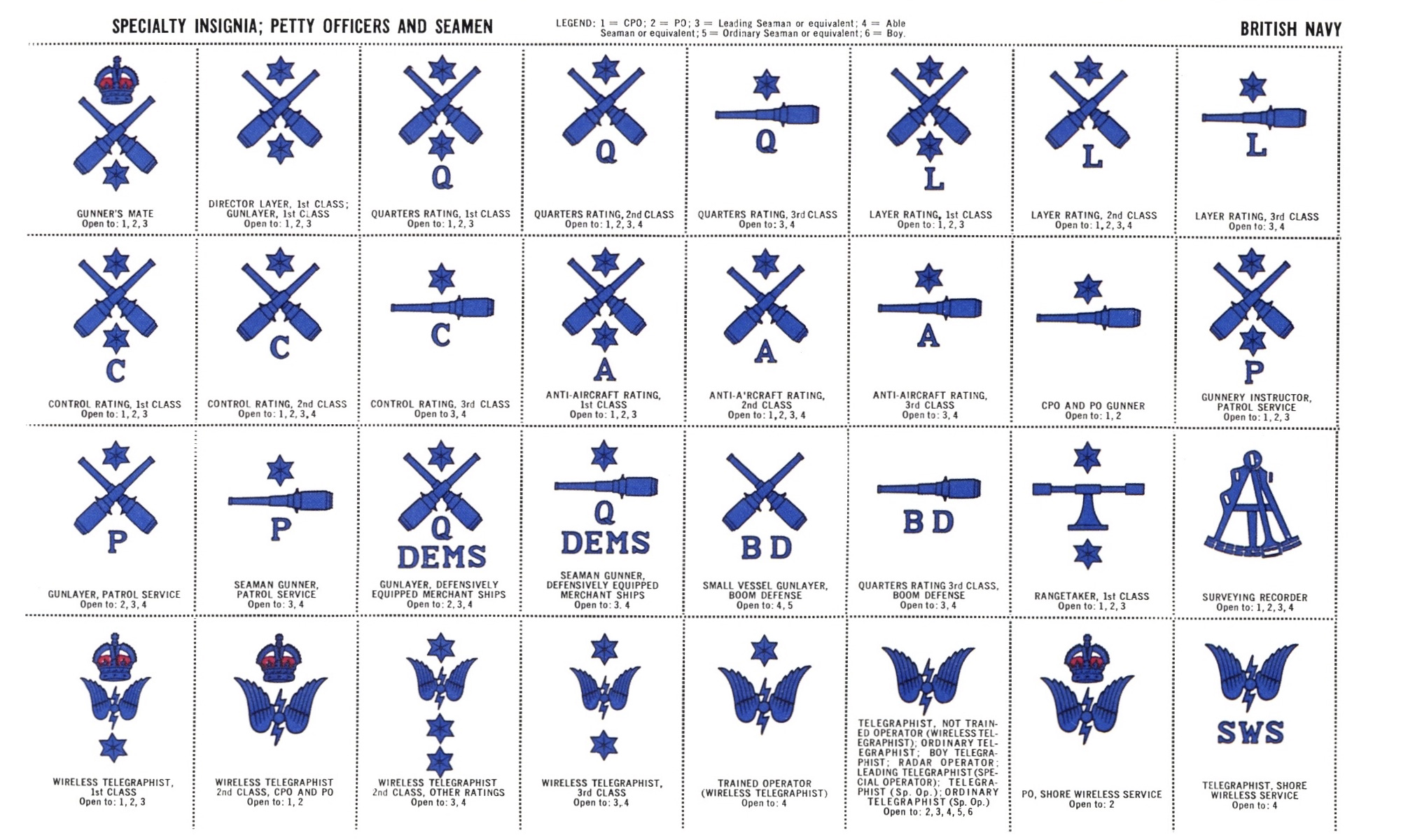
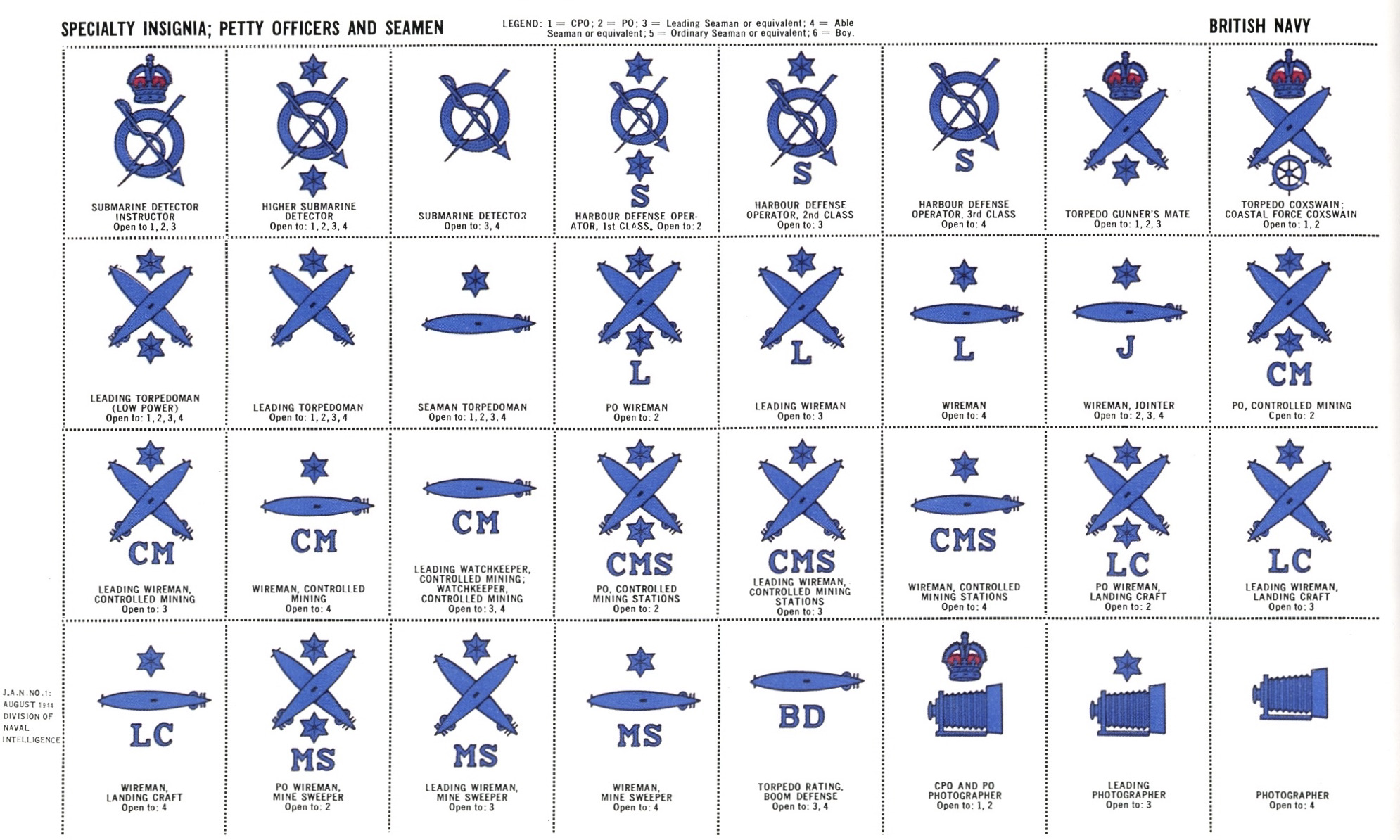
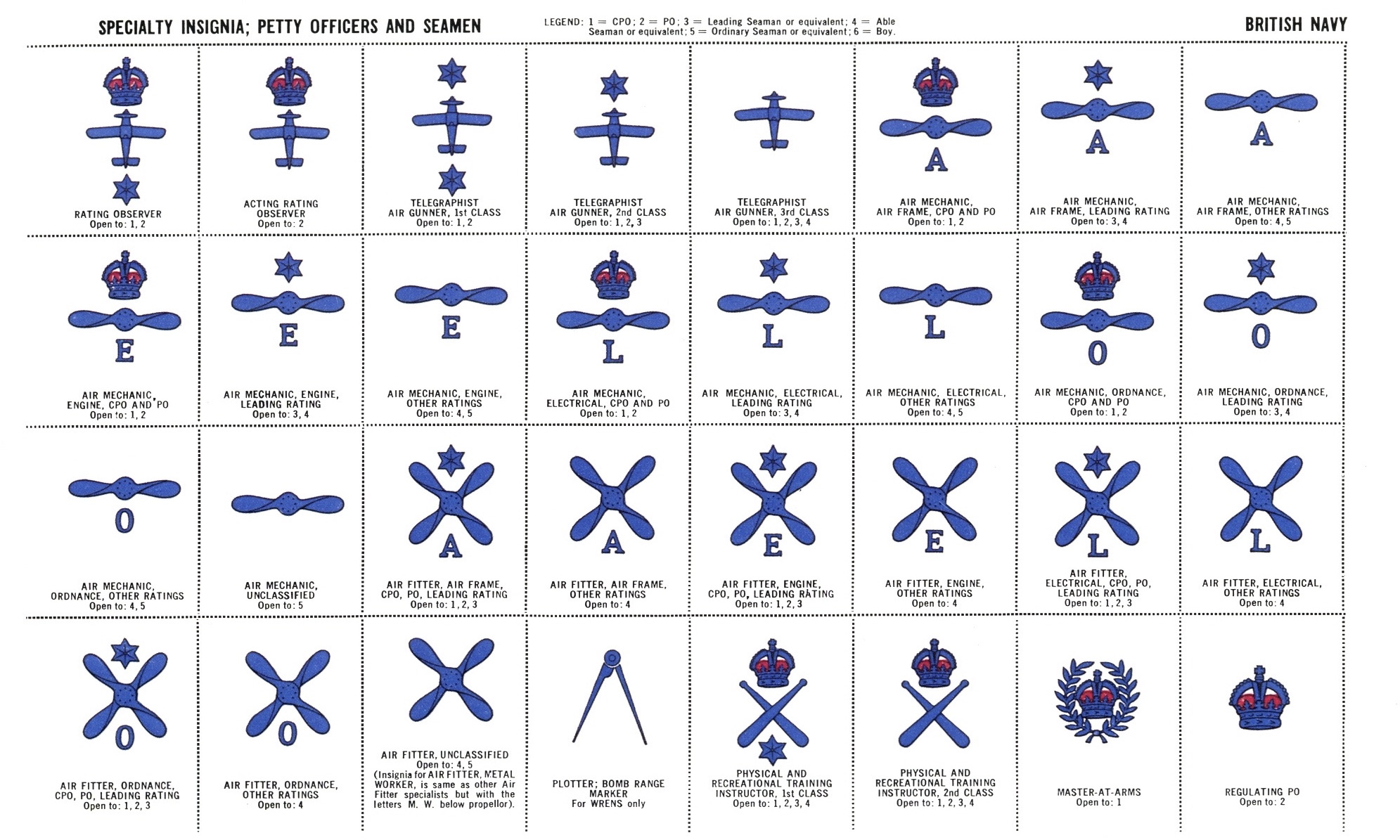
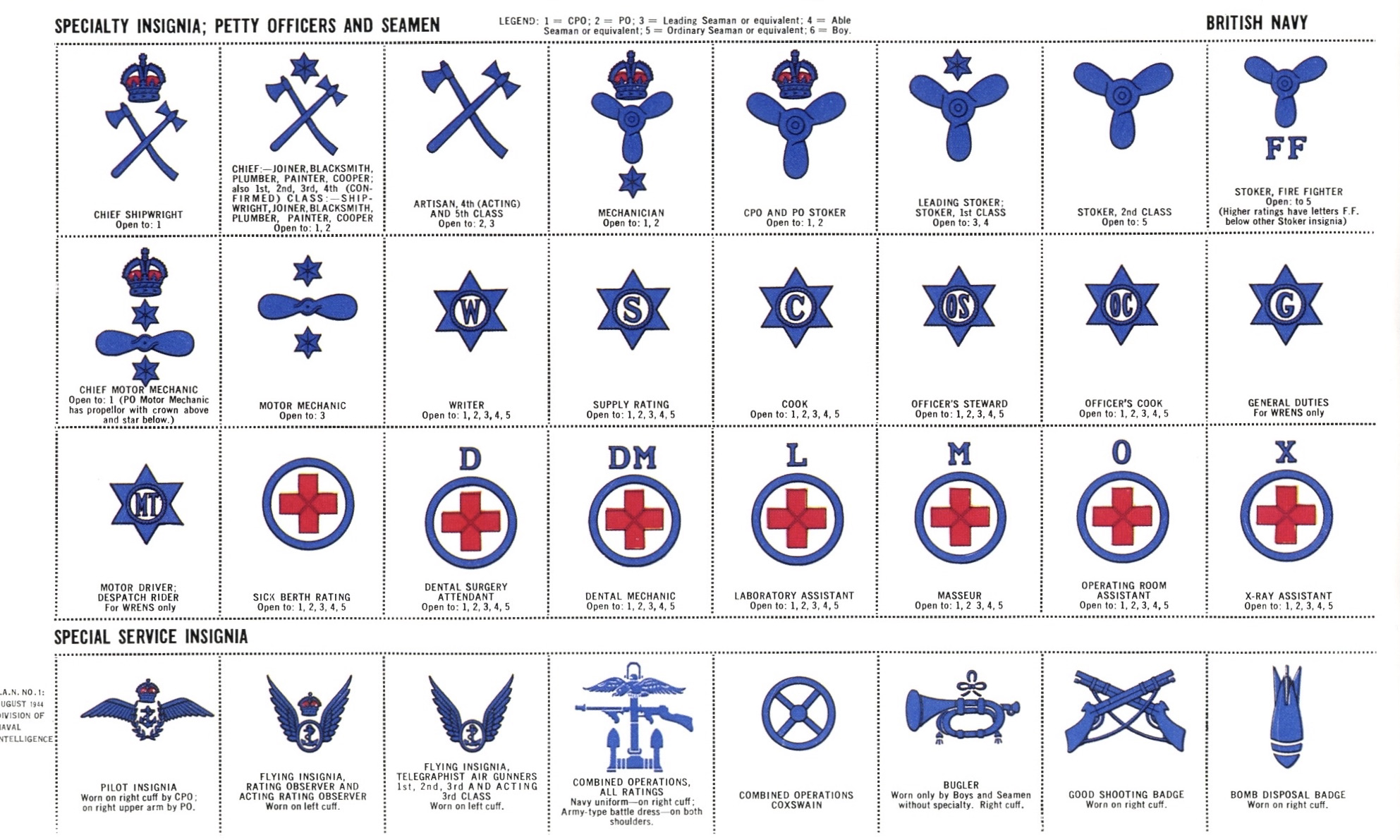

Branch badges include stars and crowns indicating a rating's qualification within their branch. One star indicates they have passed the required exam in order to be eligible to be selected for the leading rates course in their respective branch. Two stars indicates they have completed the leading rates course and are now eligible to study for the petty officers (PO) professional qualifying exam (PQE). A crown indicates they have passed the relevant PQE and are eligible to be a petty officer.

==== 1975–present ====
Insignia	Description
Basic device	on entering a sub-branch able rate, AB class 2, under training
Basic device with star above	on qualifying professionally for able rate, AB class 1, operationally trained to carry out basic tasks and expected to train for next level as leading hand.
Basic device with star above and star below	on qualifying professionally for leading rate, able to carry out complex tasks and lead others and expected to train for next level as petty officer.
Basic device with crown above	on qualifying professionally for petty officer, able to command, instruct others and carry out more complex tasks.
Basic device with crown above worn on both lapels on number 1 dress	chief petty officers attain no additional professional qualification, able to show advanced leadership, training abilities and perform the most complex tasks.

==== 1951–1975 ====
The seaman and naval airman branches were:

Insignia	Description
Basic device	Junior or basic
Basic device with star above	"Star" or third-class part II or specialist qualification (PO and below)
Basic device with star above and star below	Second-class part II or specialist qualification (PO and below)
Basic device with crown above	First-class part II or specialist qualification (PO and below)
Basic device with crown above	Second-class or lower part II or specialist qualification (CPO)
Basic device with crown above star below	First-class part II or specialist qualification (CPO)
Basic device with crown above two stars below	Chief petty officers, petty officers and confirmed

Leading rates qualified as instructors in the following branches:

- Radar plot
- Torpedo anti-Submarine
- Gunnery
- Physical training
- Tactical communication
- Radio communication

The instructor rate began to disappear in 1972, when fleet chief petty officers (warrant officers) were introduced.

Other branches, including naval air mechanics, were:

- Basic device: junior or basic technical qualification
- Basic device with star above: technical qualification for able rate
- Basic device with star above and star below: technical qualification for leading rate (Note: Not applicable to coder, supply and secretariat, artisan or sick birth branches)
- Basic device with crown above: petty officer qualified for higher rate of pay
- Basic device with crown above: chief petty officer qualified for lower rate of pay
- Basic device with crown above star below: chief petty officer qualified for higher rate of pay

Before 1947, each branch developed its own device badges and the crowns and stars of one branch did not necessarily have the same meaning as another. In 1948 and 1951, reforms were implemented to bring the branches into line with each other. A star above the badge normally indicates a person of superior qualifications, and another star below denotes that the person has passed for (and is performing) specific duties; e.g. gunnery, captain of turret, torpedo, torpedo-boat coxswain or signals. The crown is the emblem of authority, and is common in most petty officer, CPO, instructor and police badges.

Warrant officers and above do not wear branch badges. Until the late 1990s, artificer apprentices and leading artificers wore the same uniform as petty officers (with a red beret or cap badge, similar to a petty officer's). Apprentices were the last junior ratings not to be dressed as seamen; they did not wear "square rig".

== History ==
In 1879 chief petty officers received a fore-and-aft uniform similar to that of the officers, with a cap badge of an anchor within a cord surmounted by a crown. In 1890, they ceased to wear an arm badge. In 1913, the rank of petty officer 2nd class was abolished but the other badges remained the same.

In 1920, petty officers with four years' standing also received the fore-and-aft rig with the cap badge formerly worn by CPOs. The CPOs added a wreath to their cap badge, making it similar to the earlier arm badge.

In 1970 a new rank of fleet chief petty officer was introduced, with insignia of the royal coat of arms on the lower arm (identical to a warrant officer class 1 in the British Army and the RAF, to which the new rank was equivalent). This rank was renamed warrant officer, and then warrant officer class 1.

In 2004 the rank of warrant officer class 2 was formed from those CPOs holding the appointment of charge chief petty officer. The insignia is a crown within a wreath, also worn on the lower arm. The badges are now worn on the shoulders of 3A/B and 4A/B. The WO2 rank began to be phased out in April 2014 for most branches except submariner engineers, with no new appointments; existing holders of the rank retain it until they are promoted or leave the service. It now has been re-instated due to the Navy Command Transformation Programme.

=== Timeline ===
Rate group	Warrant officers		Senior ratings			Junior ratings
(1827–1853)								No insignia
(1827–1853)				1st class petty officer	2nd class petty officer			Able rate	Ordinary rate	Boy
(1853–1890)								Trade badge	No insignia
(1853–1890)			Chief petty officer (Note: Made an official rank in 1857, used unofficially since 1853)	1st class petty officer (Note: These were white, or gold on the dress uniform, or blue on white uniforms. In 1860, the badges changed from white to red on ordinary uniforms.)	2nd class petty officer	Leading rate		Able rate	Ordinary rate	Boy
(1890–1901)			No insignia					Trade badge	No insignia
(1890–1901)			Chief petty officer	1st class petty officer	2nd class petty officer	Leading rate		Able rate	Ordinary rate	Boy
(1901–1913)			No insignia					Trade badge	No insignia
(1901–1913)			Chief petty officer	1st class petty officer	2nd class petty officer	Leading rate		Able rate	Ordinary rate	Junior rate
(1913–1953)			No insignia					Trade badge	No insignia
(1913–1953)			Chief petty officer	Petty officer		Leading rate		Able rate	Ordinary rate	Junior rate
(1953–1970)								Trade badge	No insignia
(1953–1970)			Chief petty officer	Petty officer		Leading rate		Able rate	Ordinary rate	Junior rate
(1970–1985)								Trade badge	No insignia
(1970–1985)	Fleet chief petty officer		Chief petty officer	Petty officer		Leading rate		Able rate	Ordinary rate	Junior rate
(1985–1999)								Trade badge	No insignia
(1985–1999)	Warrant officer		Chief petty officer	Petty officer		Leading rate		Able rate	Ordinary rate	Junior rate
(1999–2004)
(1999–2004)	Warrant officer		Chief petty officer	Petty officer		Leading rate		Able rate
(2004–2014)
(2004–2014)	Warrant officer class 1	Warrant officer class 2	Chief petty officer	Petty officer		Leading rate		Able rate
(2014–2023)
(2014–2023)	Warrant officer		Chief petty officer	Petty officer		Leading rate		Able rate
(2021–2023)
(2021–2023)	Warrant officer class 1	Warrant officer class 2	Chief petty officer	Petty officer		Leading rate		Able rate
(2023–present)
(2023–present)	Warrant officer class 1	Warrant officer class 2	Chief petty officer	Petty officer		Leading rate		Able rate
NATO code	OR-9	OR-8	OR-7	OR-6	OR-5	OR-4	OR-3	OR-2	OR-1

== See also ==
- Ranks and insignia of the officers of the Royal Navy
- Ranks and insignia of the other ranks of the British Army
- Ranks and insignia of the other ranks of the RAF
- Ranks and insignia of NATO navies enlisted
- Ranks of the cadet forces of the United Kingdom
- Uniforms of the Royal Navy
- Uniforms of the Royal Marines
