= Tifi =

Tifi or Tiffi may refer to:

== People ==
- Søren "Tiffi" Nielsen, ice hockey player in SønderjyskE Ishockey
- Tifi Odasi, 15th century Italian poet
- Robert Tiffi, writer and director of the 2003 film Hatchetman

== Fictional characters ==
- Tiffany "Tiffi" Krohn, a character in the film I'm Losing You played by Aria Curzon
- Tiffi, the mascot main character of Candy Crush Saga
- Tifi, in the 1958 film Hercules

== Other uses ==
- Tifi, a river that flows through Akkuş, Ordu Province, Turkey
- Tifi, a type of clothing top worn by the women in Guam
- Taiwan Industrial Fastener Institute, co-organizes the Taiwan International Fastener Show

== See also ==
- "Sick Berth Tiffies", nickname for sick berth personnel in the Royal Navy
- TIFFE (disambiguation)
- River Tiffey, Norfolk, England
- Terry Tiffee, baseball player
- Tiffy (disambiguation)
