= Leading rating =

UK navy rank

Leading rating (or leading rate) is the senior of the two most junior ranks in the Royal Navy. It is equal in status to the army rank of corporal. A leading rate is permitted entry into and full use of the corporals' mess when visiting other service bases. The rate was introduced under the authority of Admiralty Circular No. 121 of 14 June 1853.

A leading rate is normally addressed as "Leading Hand" or using their branch title, e.g. Leading Seaman, Leading Regulator etc.

The insignia worn by a leading rate is a single fouled anchor on the left arm, when in dress uniform, No.2s or "Tropics". It also appears on the left arm of the white front (before the introduction of short sleeved shirts for all ratings) or overalls. Until 2017, a "hook" was worn on each shoulder epaulette, when in working rig, woolly pully or burberry. This was before the introduction of the new uniforms with the single insignia in the chest centre. This led to the slang term killick or hooky used in reference to this rate.

== See also ==
- Able seaman (rank)
- Leading seaman
- Petty officer
