= TIFFE =

TIFFE may refer to:

- TIFFE, Thermal systems Integration For Fuel Economy, an automobile air conditioning system
- TIFFE, Tokyo International Financial Futures Exchange (now Tokyo Financial Exchange)

== See also ==
- Tifi (disambiguation)
