= Comparative navy enlisted ranks of Oceania =

Rank comparison chart of naval forces of Oceanian states.

== Enlisted ==
Rank group	Senior NCOs					Junior NCOs		Enlisted
Royal Australian Navy
Royal Australian Navy	Warrant Officer of the Navy	Warrant officer	Chief petty officer		Petty officer	Leading seaman		Able seaman	Seaman
Federated States of Micronesia	No navy
Republic of Fiji Navy									No insignia
Republic of Fiji Navy	Warrant officer class 1		Warrant officer class 2	Chief petty officer	Petty officer	Leading seaman			Ordinary seaman
Kiribati	No navy
Marshall Islands	No navy
Nauru	No navy
Royal New Zealand Navy
Royal New Zealand Navy	Warrant officer			Chief petty officer	Petty officer	Leading hand		Able rate	Ordinary rate
Palau	No navy
Papua New Guinea Maritime Element									No insignia
Papua New Guinea Maritime Element	Warrant officer			Chief petty officer	Petty officer	Leading seaman		Able seaman	Seaman
Samoa	No navy
Solomon Islands	No navy
Tongan Navy								No insignia
Tongan Navy	Warrant officer class 1		Warrant officer class 2	Staff sergeant	Sergeant	Corporal	Lance corporal	Private
Tuvalu	No navy
Vanuatu Maritime Wing
Vanuatu Maritime Wing				Senior sergeant Long sajen	Sergeant; Sajen	Corporal; Kofol		Constable; Polis	Recruit; Rikrut
Rank group	Senior NCOs					Junior NCOs		Enlisted

== See also ==
- Comparative navy enlisted ranks of the Americas
- Comparative navy enlisted ranks of the Commonwealth
- Ranks and insignia of NATO navies enlisted
