= Comparative navy enlisted ranks of Asia =

Rank comparison chart of navies of Asian states.

== Enlisted ==
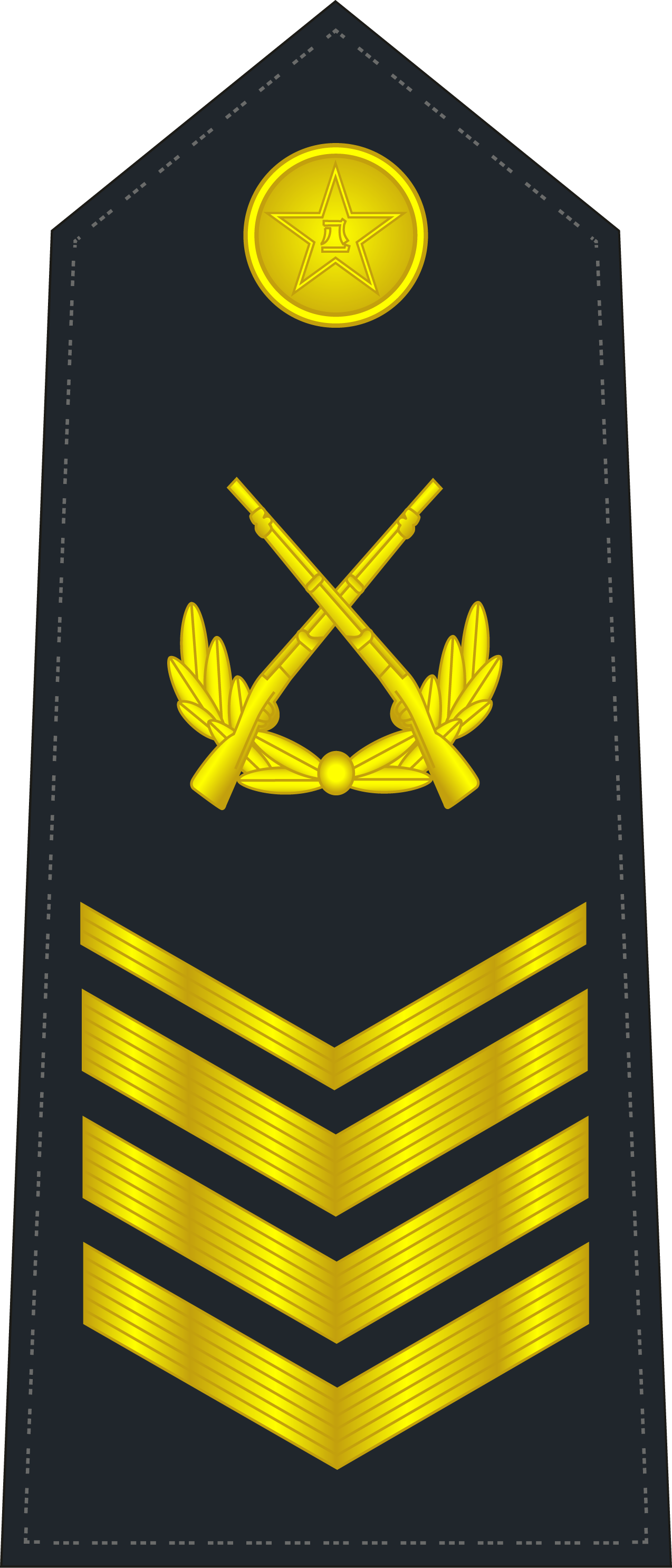
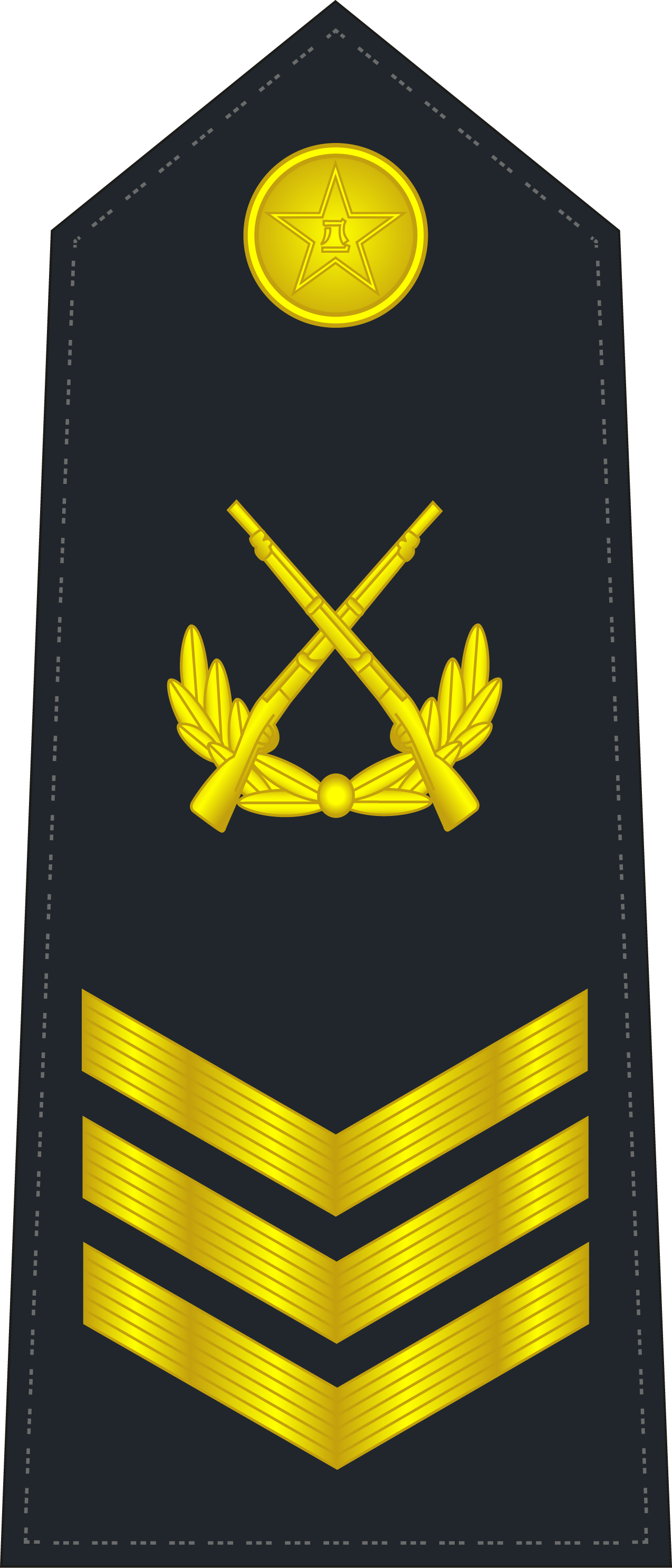
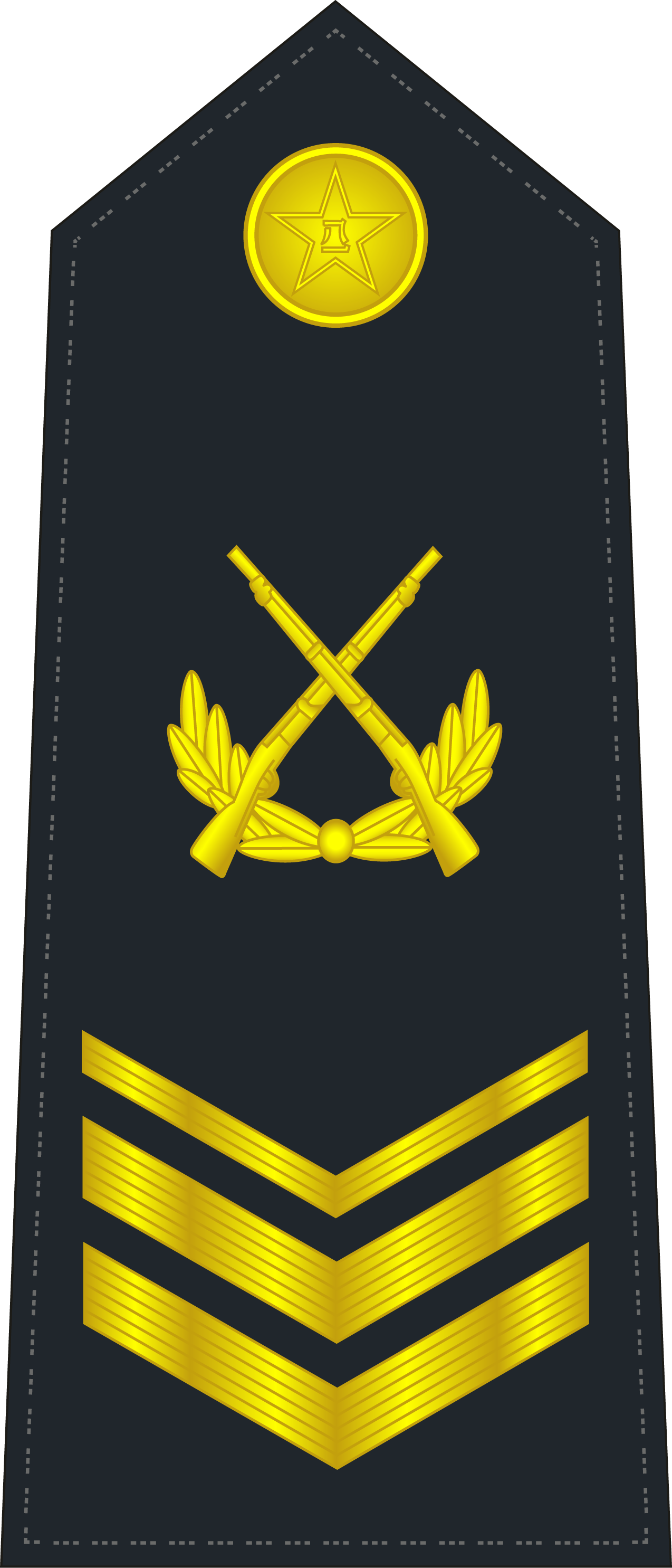
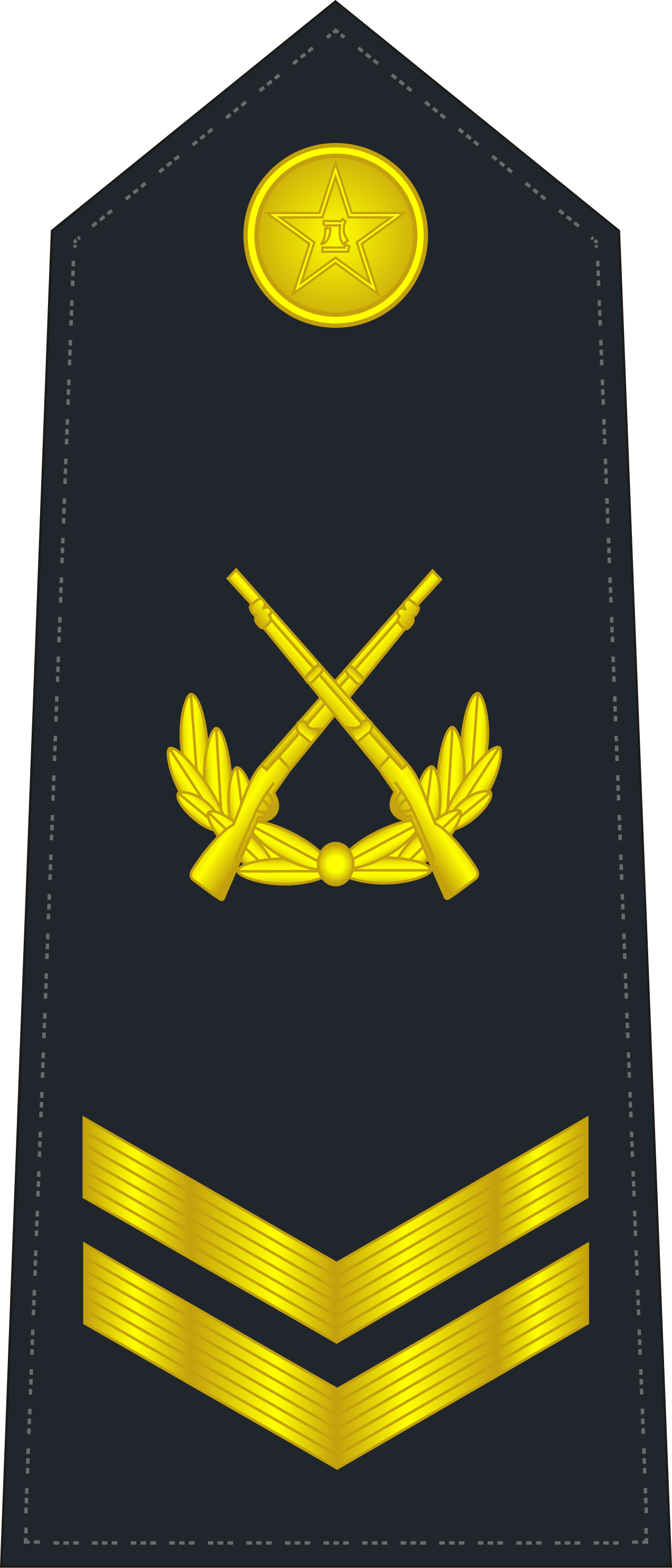
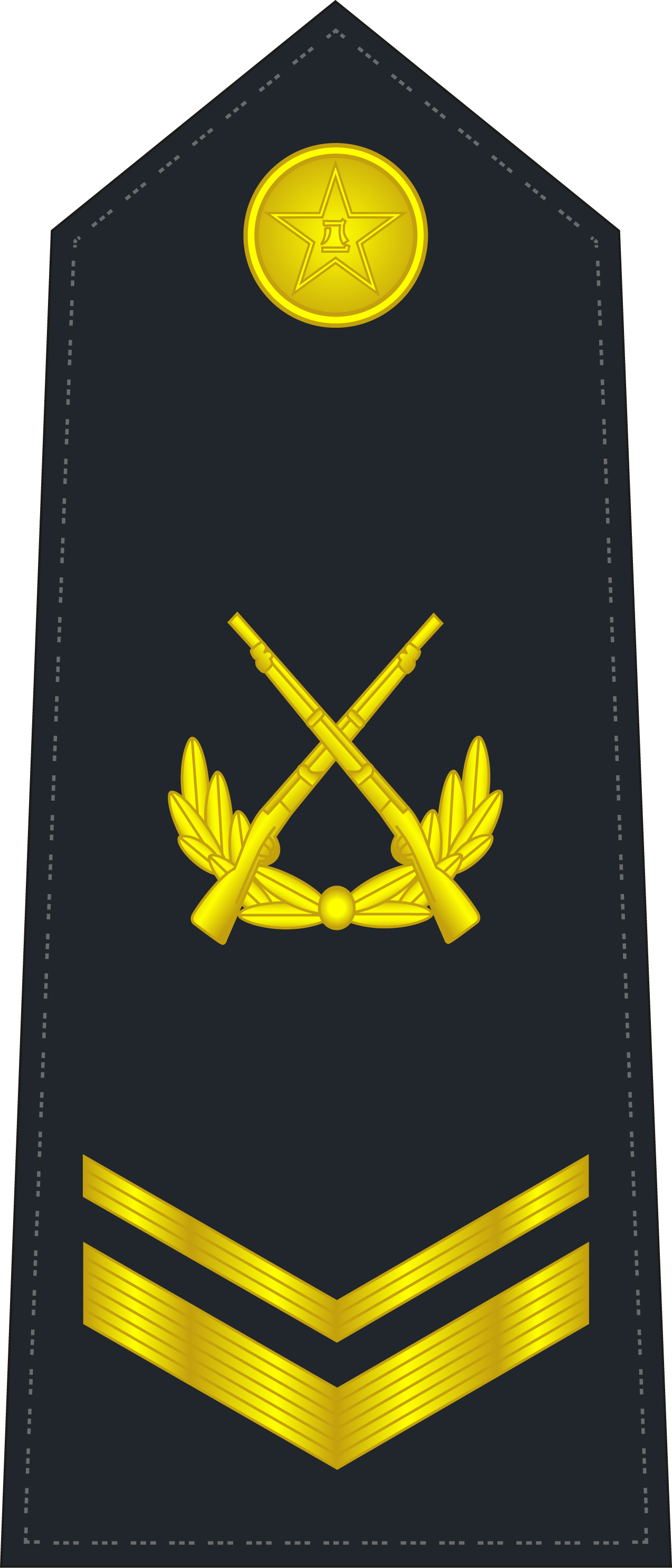
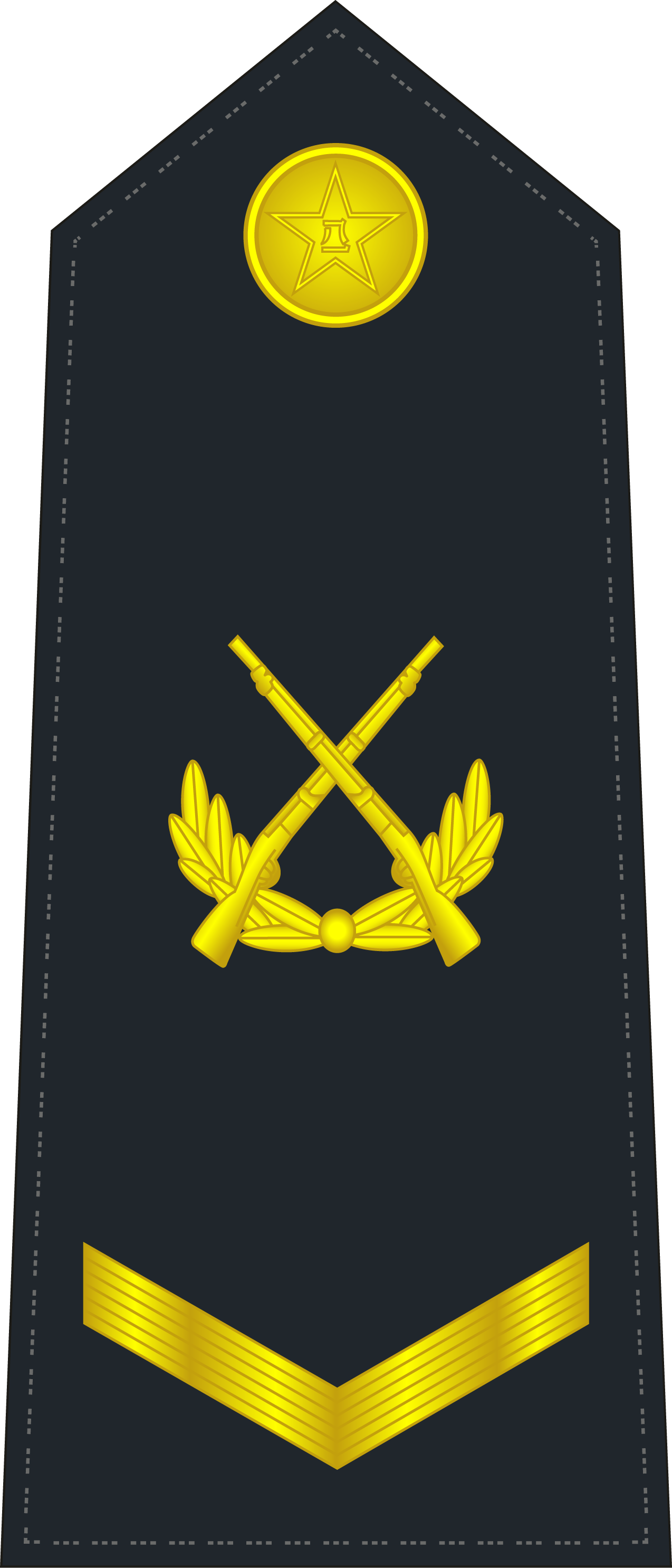
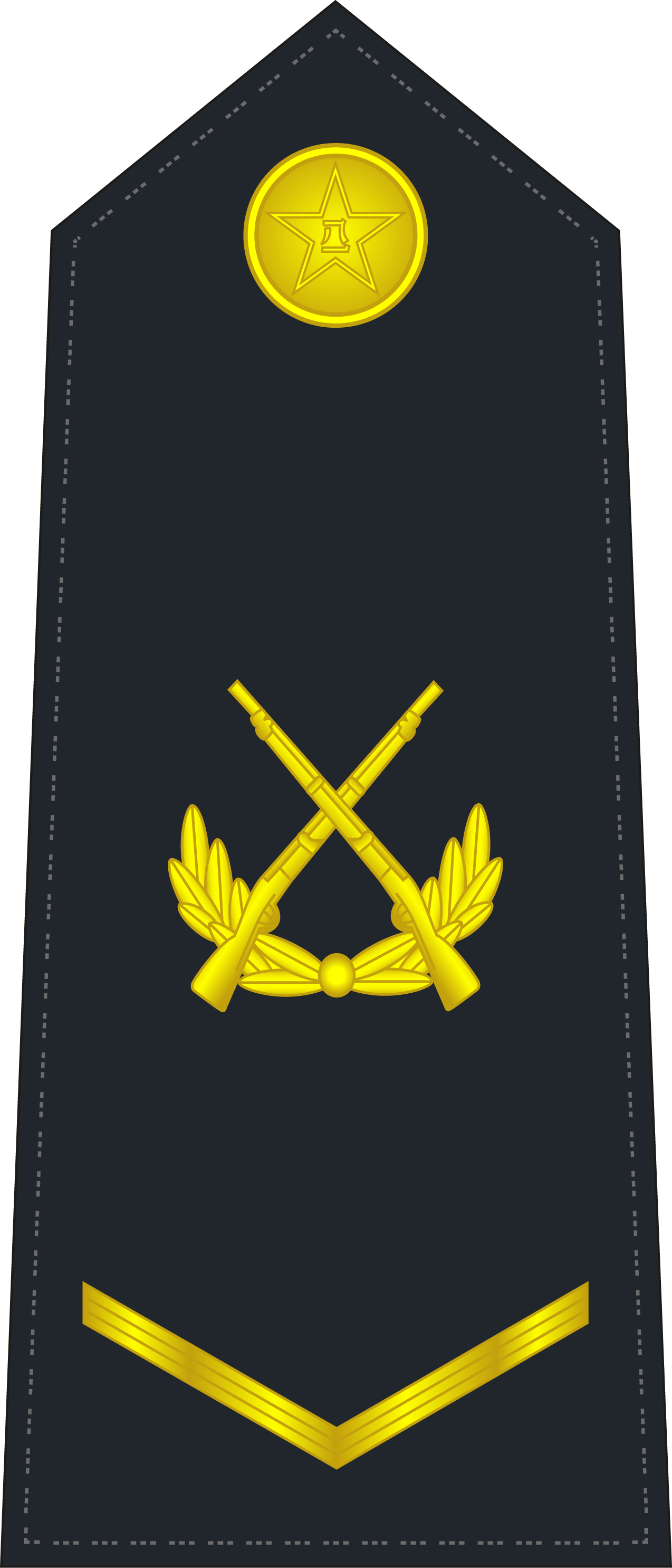
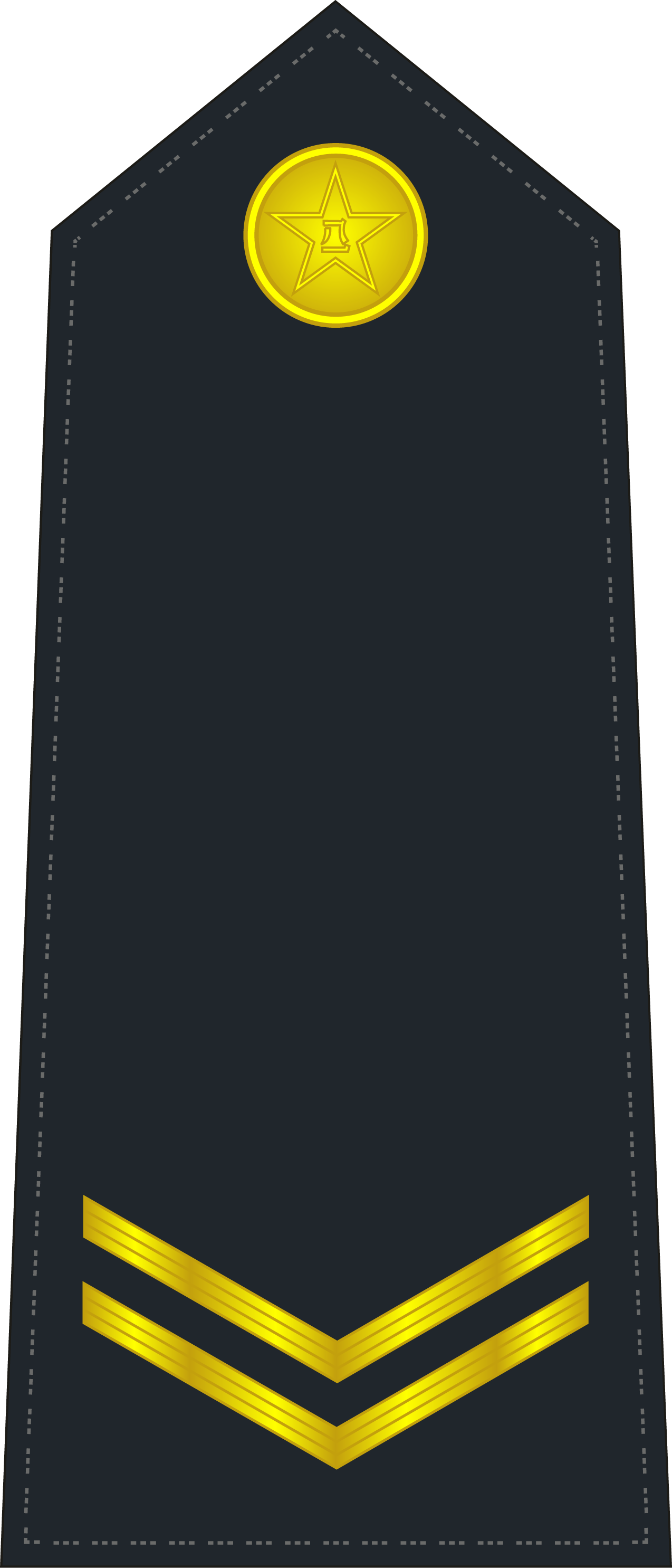
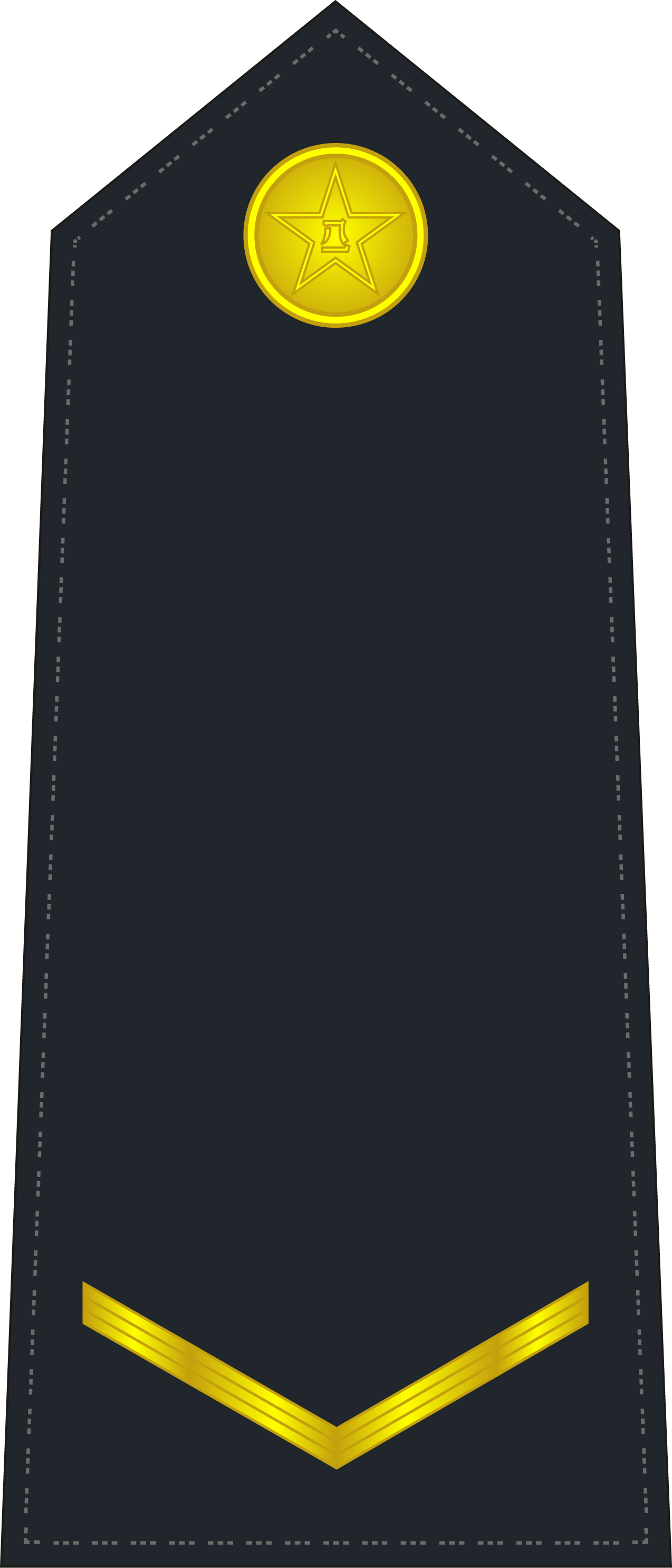
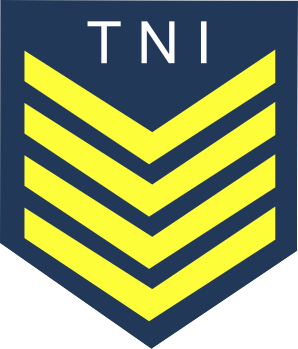
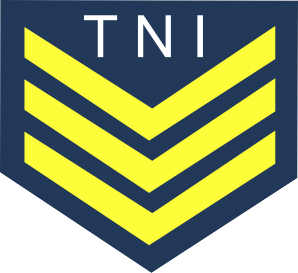
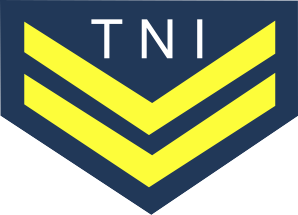
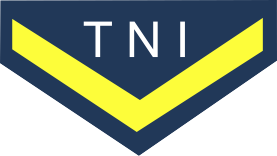
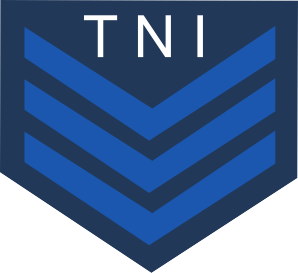
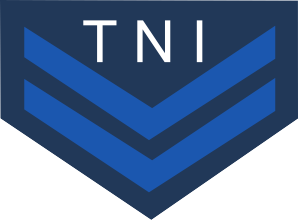
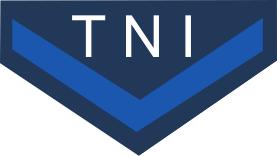
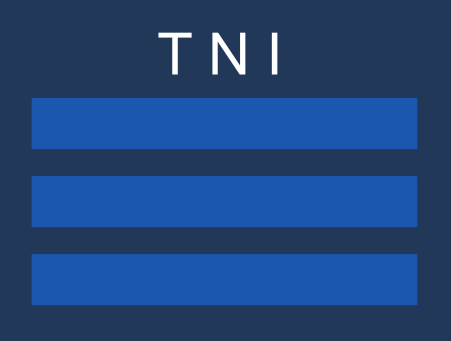
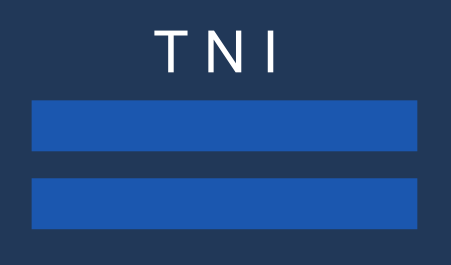
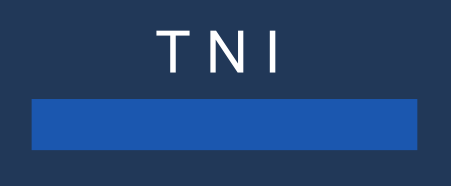
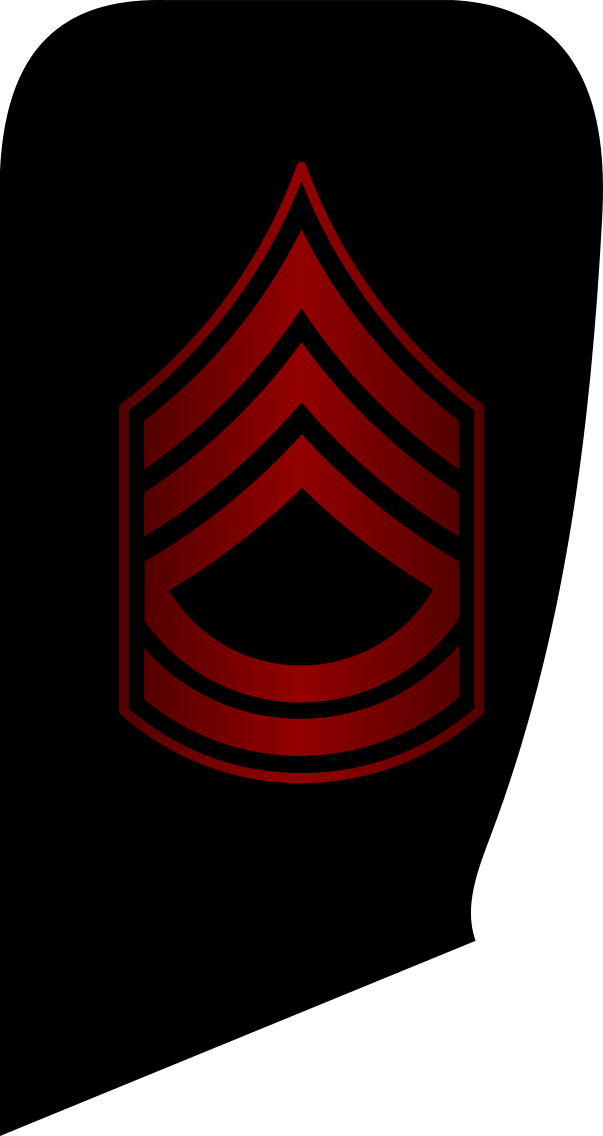
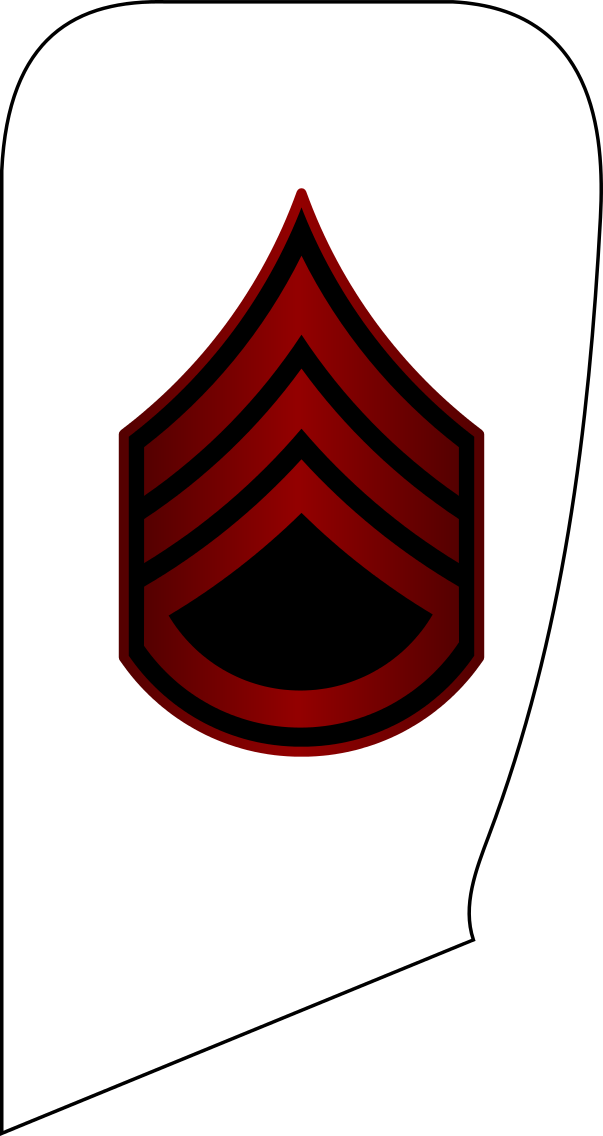
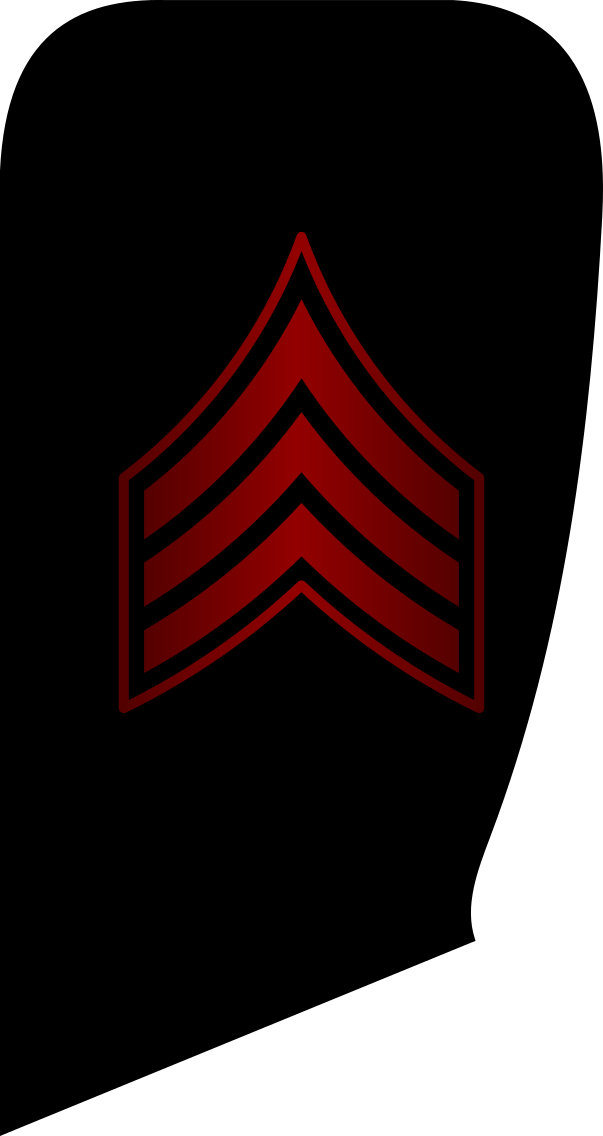
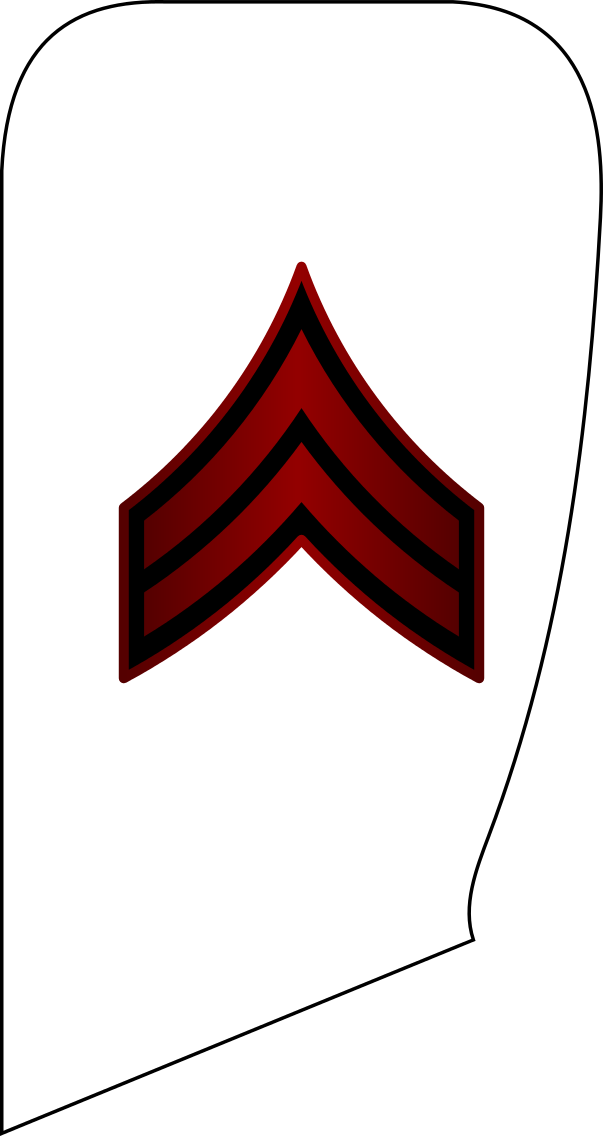
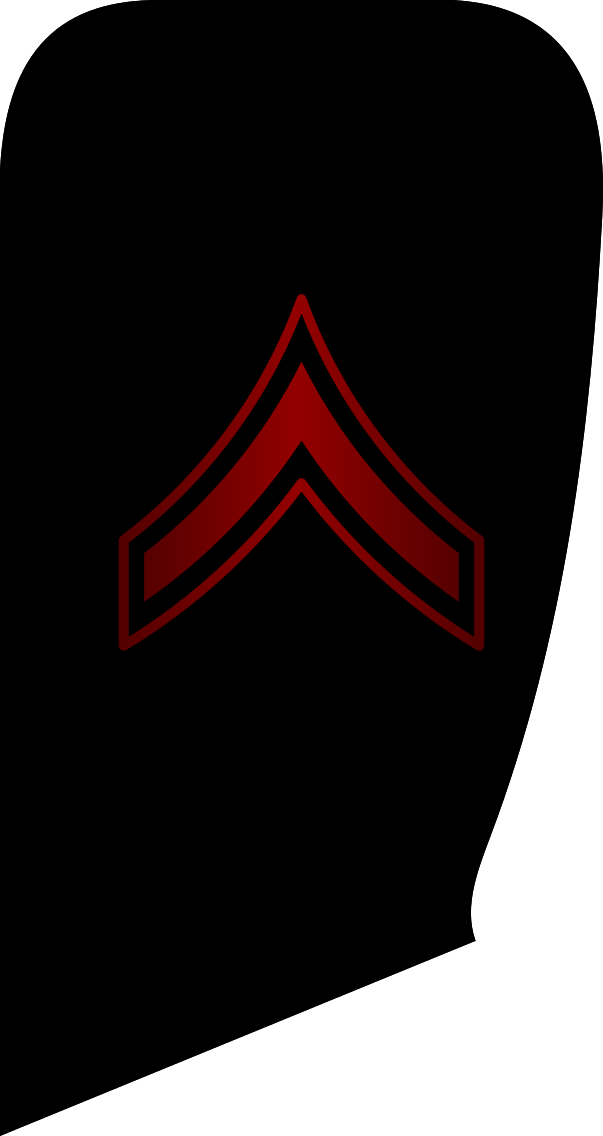
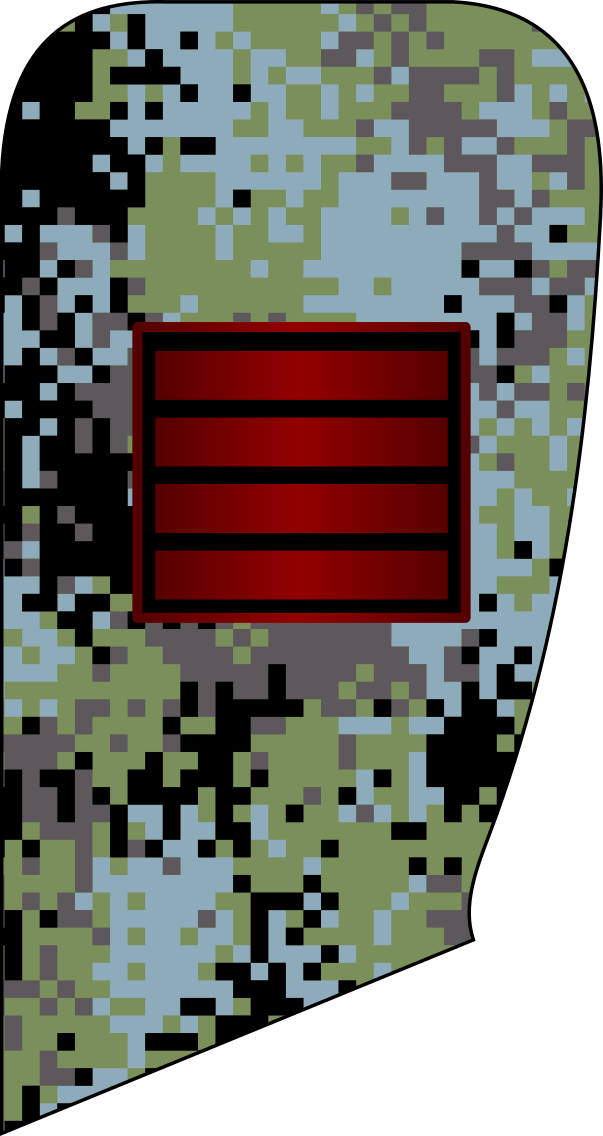
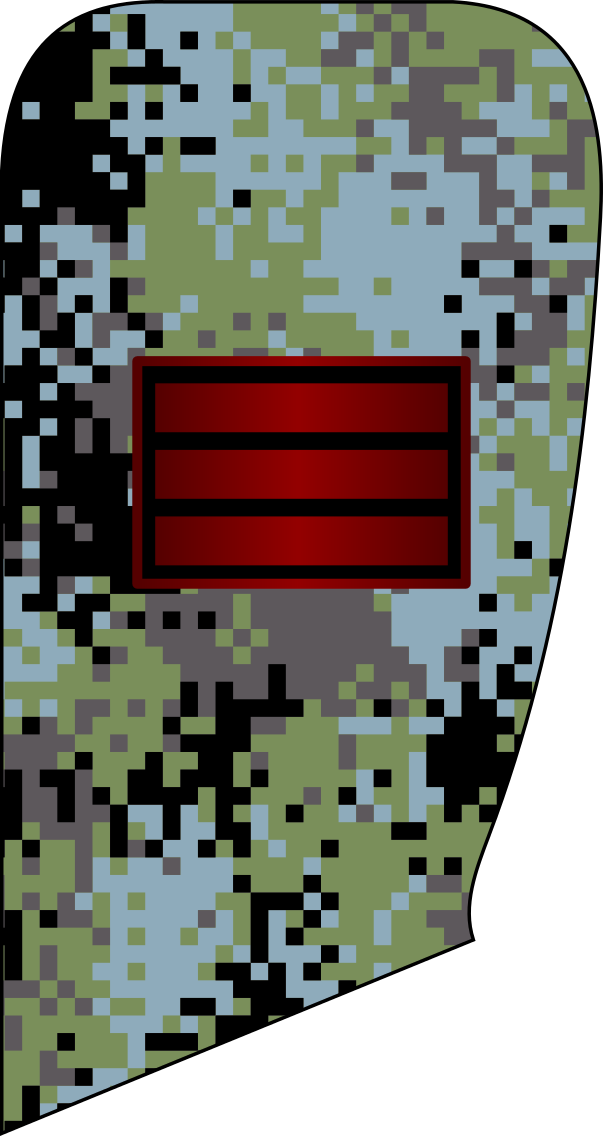
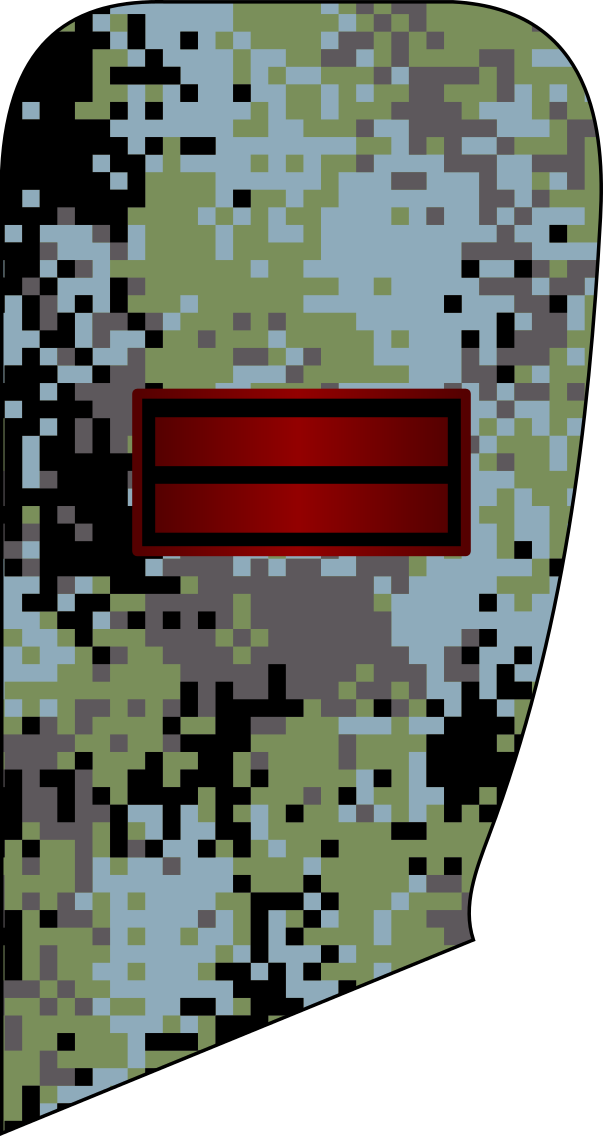
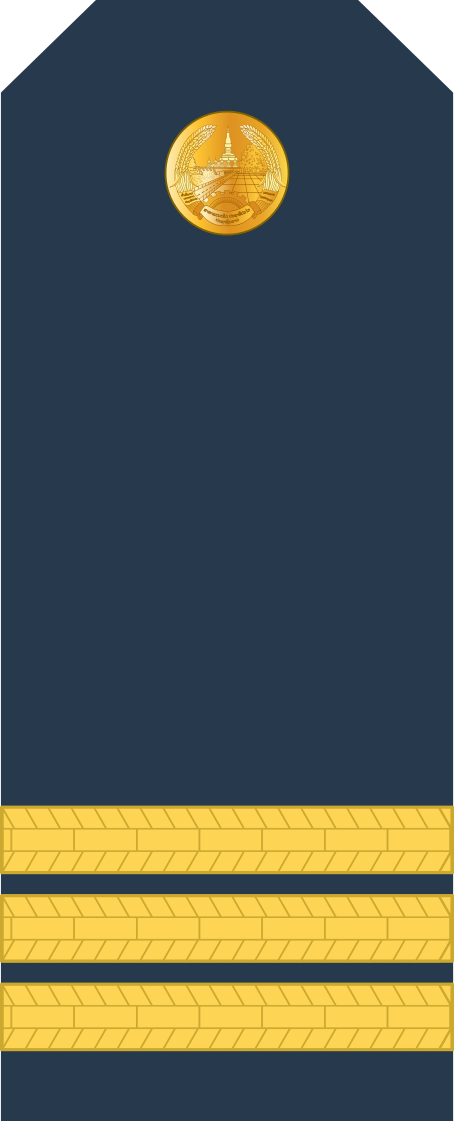
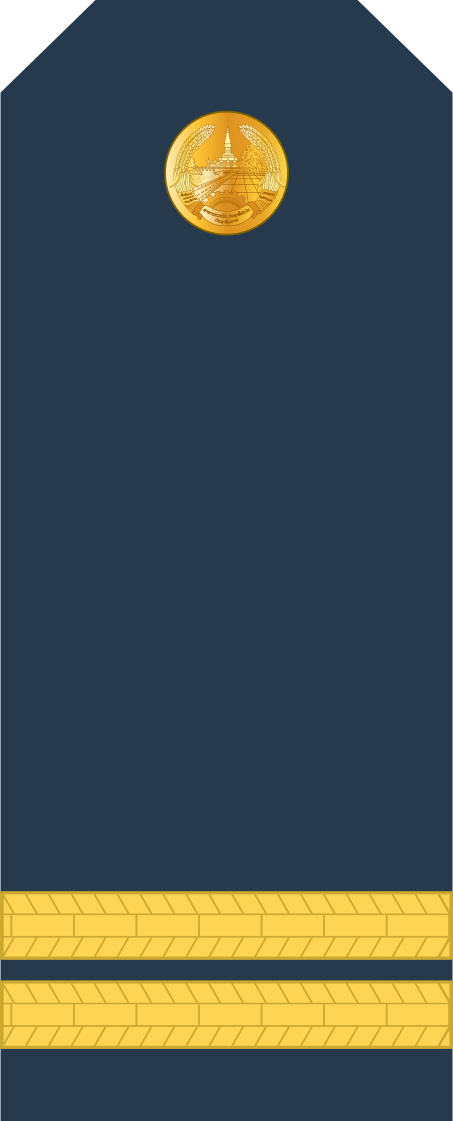
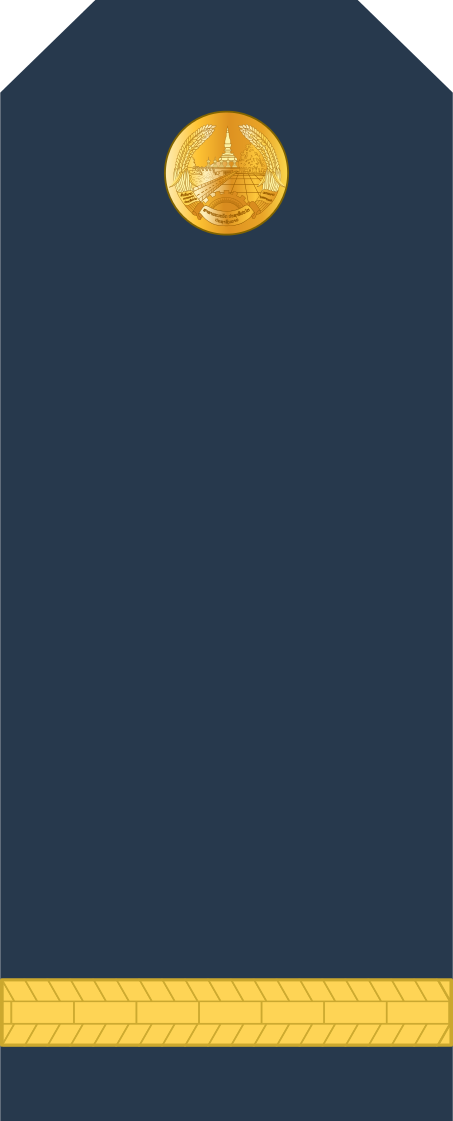
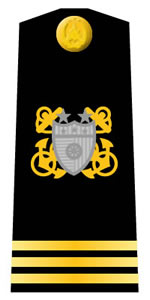
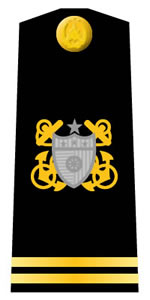
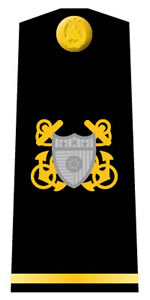
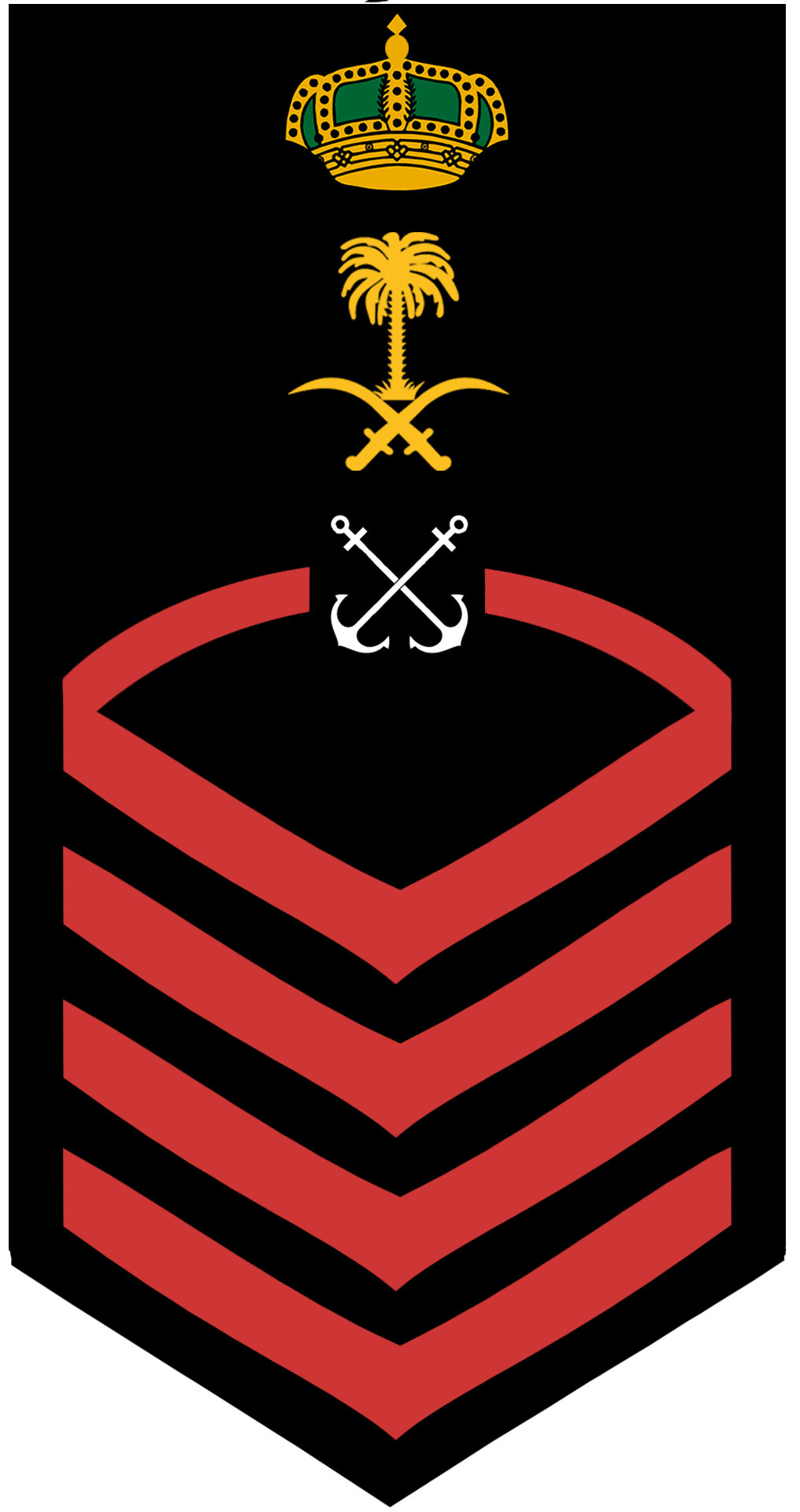
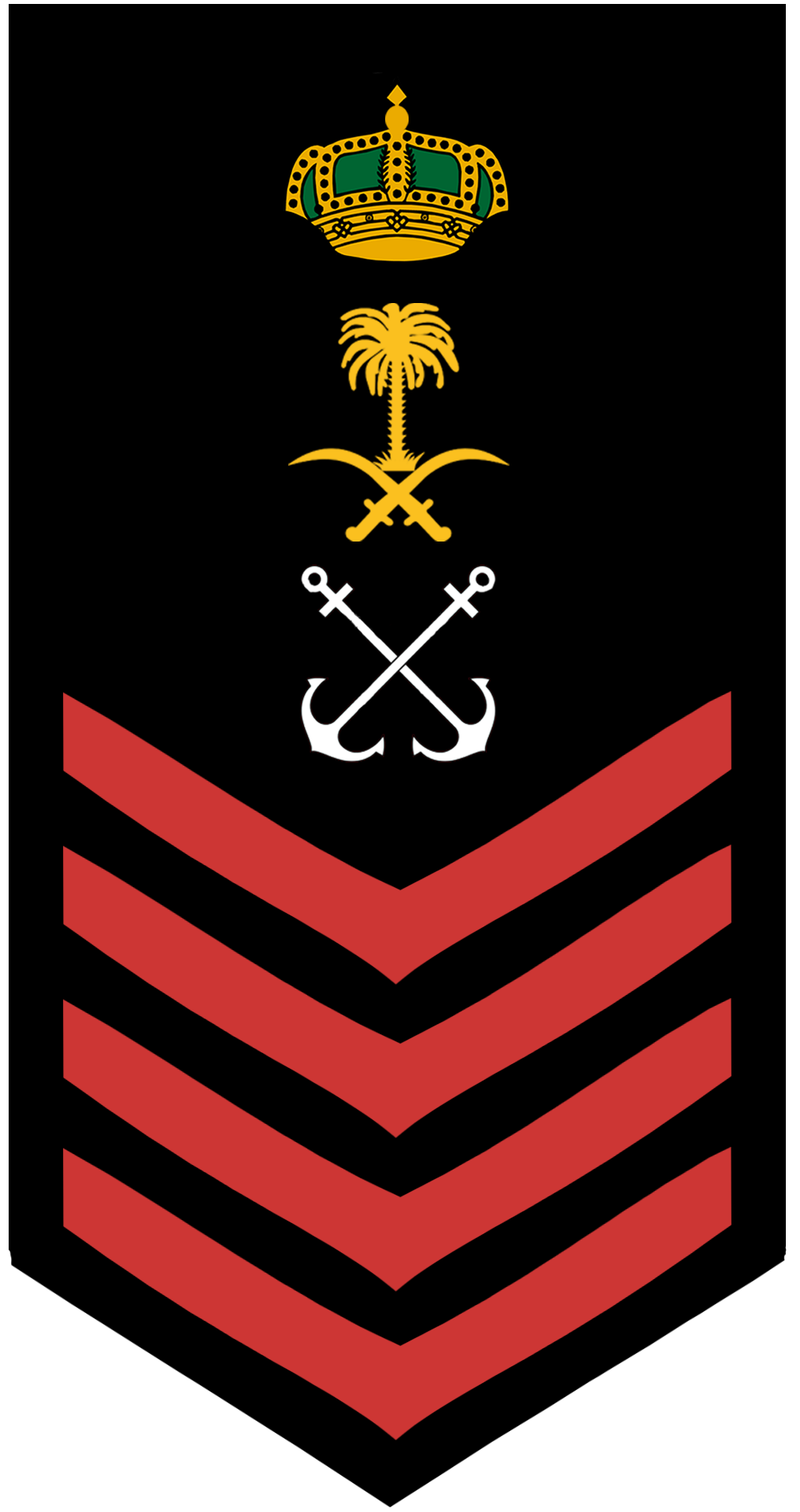
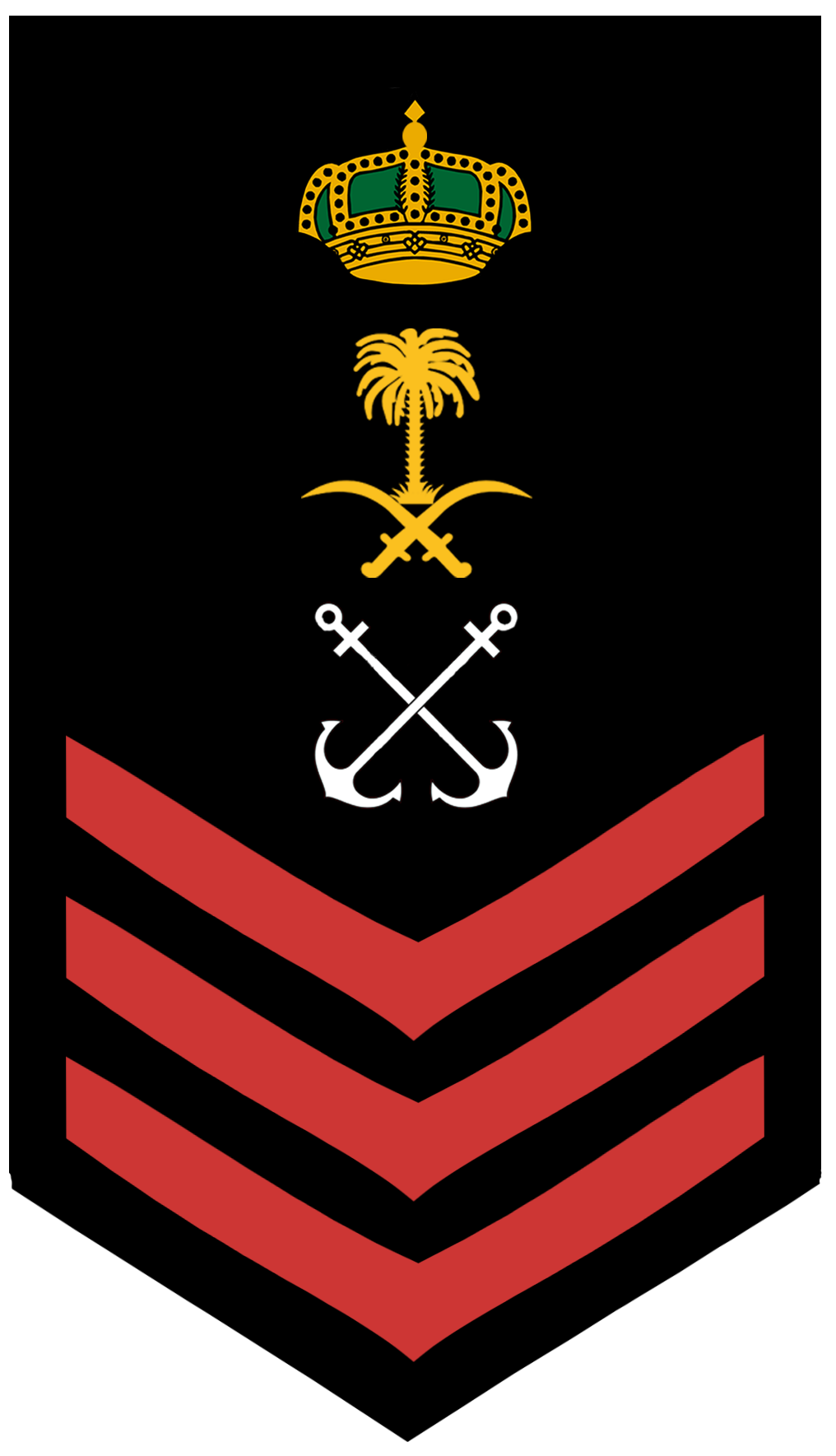
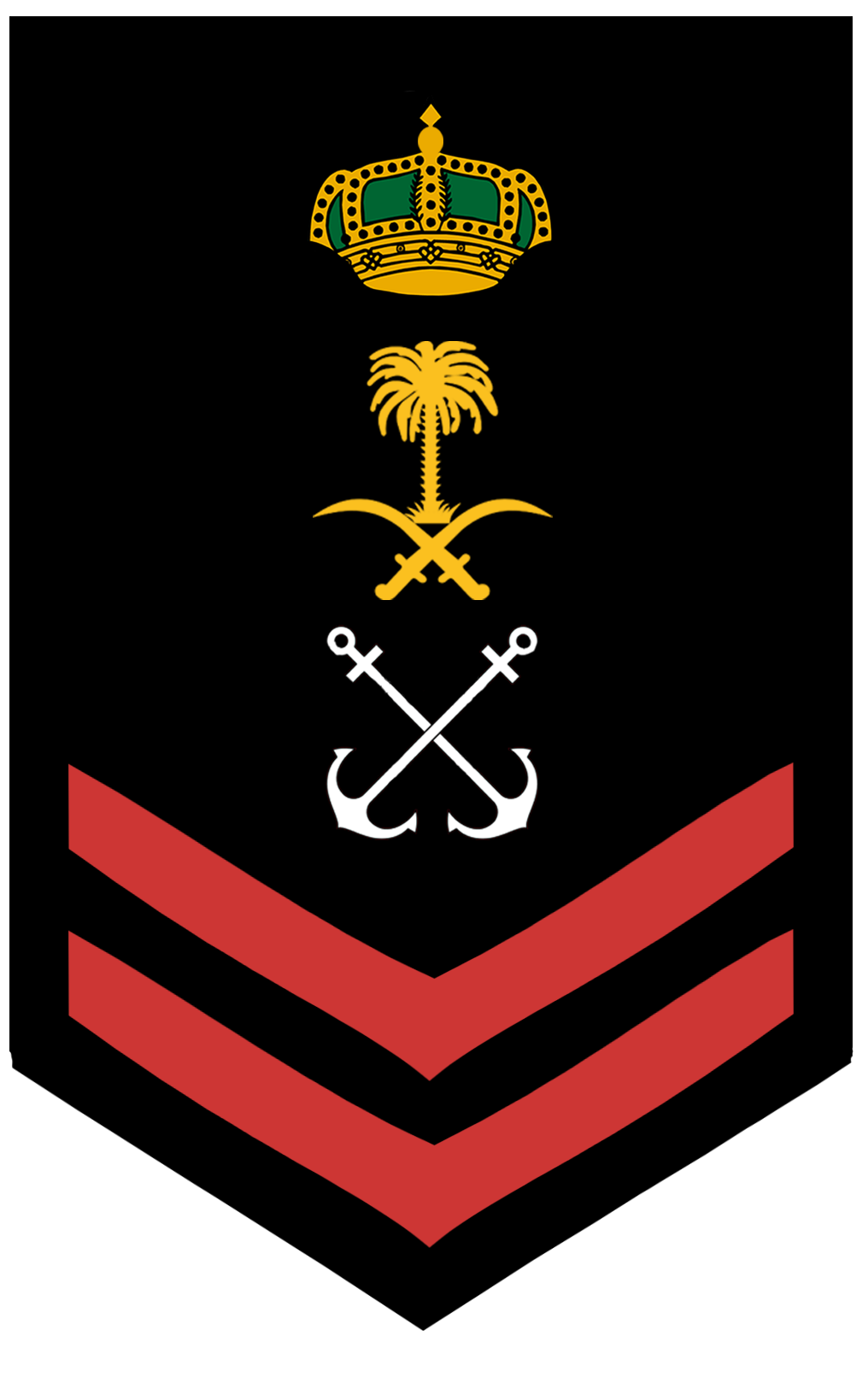
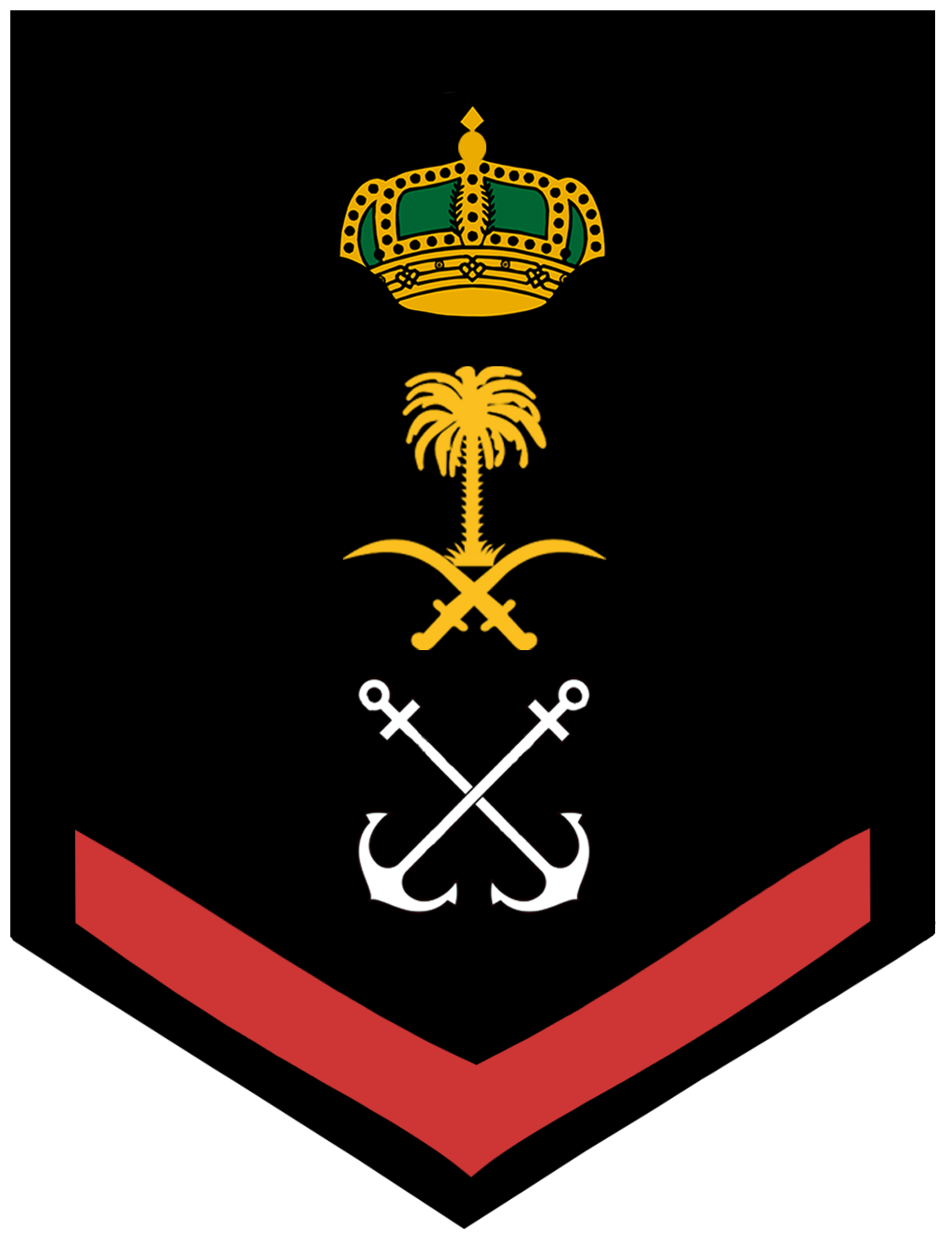
Rank group	Senior NCOs											Junior NCOs			Enlisted
Islamic Emirate of Afghanistan	No navy
Armenia	No navy
Azerbaijani Navy															No insigna
Azerbaijani Navy	Baş miçman	Miçman	Kiçik miçman		Baş çavuş		Çavuş		Kiçik çavuş			Baş matros			Matros
Royal Bahrain Naval Force																	No insignia
Royal Bahrain Naval Force					رقیب أول; Raqib 'awal				رقیب; Raqib			عريف; Earif			جندي أول; Jundiun awwal		جندي; Jundiun
Bangladesh Navy														No insignia			No insignia
Bangladesh Navy	মাস্টার চীফ পেটি অফিসার; Māsṭār chīph pēṭi ôphisār		সিনিয়র চীফ পেটি অফিসার; Siniẏar chīph pēṭi ôphisār		চীফ পেটি অফিসার; Chīph pēṭi ôphisār		পেটি অফিসার; Pēṭi ôphisār					লিডিং সীম্যান; Liḍiṁ sīmaen		এ্যাবল সীম্যান; Ēyābal sīmaen			অর্ডিনারী সিম্যান; Ôrḍinārī simaen
Bhutan	No navy
Royal Brunei Navy															No insignia
Royal Brunei Navy	Pegawai waran 1		Pegawai waran 2		Bintara kanan		Bintara					Laskar kanan		Laskar muda	Prebet/Soldadu
Royal Cambodian Navy
Royal Cambodian Navy	នាយចក្របាលឯក; Neay chakrabal ek		នាយចក្របាលទោ Neay chakrabal tou		ចក្របាលឯក; Chakrabal ek		ចក្របាលទោ Chakrabal tou		ចក្របាលត្រី Chakrabal trei			ចក្របាលរងឯក; Chakrabal rong ek		ចក្របាលរងទោ Chakrabal rong tou	នាវិកឯក; Neavik ek		នាវិកទោ Neavik tou
PLA Navy
PLA Navy	海军一级军士长; Hǎijūn yījí jūnshìzhǎng	海军二级军士长; Hǎijūn èrjí jūnshìzhǎng	海军三级军士长; Hǎijūn sānjí jūnshìzhǎng		海军四级军士长; Hǎijūn sìjí jūnshìzhǎng		海军上士; Hǎijūn shàngshì		海军中士; Hǎijūn zhōngshì			海军下士; Hǎijūn xiàshì			海军上等兵; Hǎijūn shàngděngbīng		海军列兵; Hǎijūn lièbīng
Republic of China Navy
Republic of China Navy	一等士官長; Yīděng shìguānzhǎng		二等士官長; Èrděng shìguānzhǎng		三等士官長; Sānděng shìguānzhǎng		上士; Shàngshì		中士; Zhōngshì			下士; Xiàshì		上等兵; Shàngděngbīng	一等兵; Yīděngbīng		二等兵; Èrděngbīng
Republic of China Marine Corps
Republic of China Marine Corps	一等士官長; Yīděng shìguānzhǎng		二等士官長; Èrděng shìguānzhǎng		三等士官長; Sānděng shìguānzhǎng		上士; Shàngshì		中士; Zhōngshì			下士; Xiàshì		上等兵; Shàngděngbīng	一等兵; Yīděngbīng		二等兵; Èrděngbīng
Indian Navy															No insignia
Indian Navy	Master chief petty officer I मास्टर चीफ पेटी ऑफिसर फर्स्ट क्लास		Master chief petty officer II मास्टर चीफ पेटी ऑफिसर सेकेंड क्लास		Chief petty officer चीफ पेटी ऑफिसर		Petty officer पेटी ऑफिसर					Leading Seaman लीडिंग सीमैन			Seaman Ist class सीमैन फर्स्ट क्लास		Seaman IInd class सीमैन सेकंड क्लास
Indonesian Navy
Indonesian Navy	Pembantu letnan satu	Pembantu letnan dua	Sersan mayor		Sersan kepala		Sersan satu		Sersan dua			Kopral kepala	Kopral satu	Kopral dua	Kelasi kepala	Kelasi satu	Kelasi dua
Iranian Navy
Iranian Navy	ناواستوار یکم; Navostovar yekom		ناواستوار دوم; Navostovar dovom		مهناوی یکم; Mahnavi yekom		مهناوی دوم; Mahnavi dovom		مهناوی سوم; Mahnavi sevom			سرناوی; Sarnavi		ناوی یکم; Navi yekom	ناوی دوم; Navi dovom		ناوی; Navi
Iraqi Navy
Iraqi Navy					رقيب أول; Rayiys eurafa		رقيب; Arif					نائب عريف; Nāyīb arīf			جندي أول; Jundi 'awwal		جندى; Jundi
Israeli Navy															No insignia
Israeli Navy	רב-נגד; Rav nagad	רב-סמל בכיר; Rav samal bakhír	רב-סמל מתקדם; Rav samal mitkadem	רב-סמל ראשון; Rav samal rishon	רב-סמל; Rav samal		סמל ראשון; Samal rishon		סמל; Samal			רב טוראי; Rav turai			טוראי; Turai
Rank group	Senior NCOs											Junior NCOs			Enlisted
Japan Maritime Self-Defense Force
Japan Maritime Self-Defense Force	海曹長; Kaisōchō				1等海曹; Ittō kaisō		2等海曹; Nitō kaisō		3等海曹; Santō kaisō			海士長; Kaishichō		1等海士; Ittō kaishi	2等海士; Nitō kaishi		自衛官候補生; Jieikan kōhosei
Royal Jordanian Navy																	No insignia
Royal Jordanian Navy	وكيل أول; Wakil 'awal		وكيل; Wakil		رقيب أول; Raqib 'awal		رقیب; Raqib					عريف; Earif			جندي أول; Jundiun awwal		جندي; Jundiun
Kazakh Naval Forces
Kazakh Naval Forces	Шебер-старшина; Şeber-starşïna	Штаб-старшина; Ştab-starşïna	Бірінші сыныпты старшина Birinşi sınıptı starşïna	Eкінші сыныпты старшина Ekinşi sınıptı starşïna	Үшінші сыныпты старшина Üşinşi sınıptı starşïna	Бас старшина Bas starshyna	Бірінші сатылы старшина Birinşi satılı starşïna		Екінші сатылы старшина Ekinşi satılı starşïna			Аға матрос Ağa matros		Матрос; Matros
Korean People's Navy
Korean People's Navy	특무상사; T'ŭkmu-sangsa		상사; Sangsa		중사; Chungsa		하사; Hasa		상급병사; Sanggŭp-pyŏngsa			중급병사; Chungŭp-pyŏngsa		하급병사; Hagŭp-pyŏngsa	전사; Chŏnsa
Republic of Korea Navy
Republic of Korea Navy	원사; Wonsa		상사; Sangsa		중사; Jungsa		하사; Hasa		병장; Byeongjang			상등병; Sangdeungbyeong		일등병; Ildeungbyeong	이등병; Ideungbyeong
Republic of Korea Marine Corps
Republic of Korea Marine Corps	원사; Wonsa		상사; Sangsa		중사; Jungsa		하사; Hasa		병장; Byeongjang			상등병; Sangdeungbyeong		일등병; Ildeungbyeong	이등병; Ideungbyeong
Kuwait Navy																	No insignia
Kuwait Navy	وكيل أول; Wakil 'awal		وكيل; Wakil		رقيب أول; Raqib 'awal		رقیب; Raqib					عريف; Earif			جندي أول; Jundiun awwal		جندي; Jundiun
Kyrgyzstan	No navy
(Laos) Lao People's Navy
(Laos) Lao People's Navy			ວາທີ Va thi				ສິບເອກ; Sib ek		ສິບໂທ; Sib oth			ສິບຕີ Sib ti			ຊັ້ນຫນຶ່ງ; Sannung		ຊັ້ນສອງ; Sansong
Royal Malaysian Navy																	No insignia
Royal Malaysian Navy	Pegawai waran I		Pegawai waran II		Bintara kanan		Bintara muda					Laskar kanan		Laskar kelas I	Laskar kelas II		Perajurit muda
Maldivian Coast Guard																	No insignia
Maldivian Coast Guard	ކޮމާންޑް ސާރޖަންޓް މޭޖަރ; Komaand saarjant meyjar	ސާރޖަންޓް މޭޖަރ; Saarjant meyjar	ފަސްޓް ސާރޖަންޓް Fast saarjant		ސާރޖަންޓް ފަސްޓް ކްލާސް Saarjant fast klaas		ސްޓާފް ސާރޖަންޓް Staaf saarjant		ސާރޖަންޓް Saarjant			ކޯޕްރަލް Koapral		ލާންސް ކޯޕްރަލް Laans koapral			ޕްރައިވެޓް Praivet
Mongolia	No navy
Myanmar Navy																	No insignia	No insignia
Myanmar Navy	အရာခံဗိုလ် ’araākhaṃ bauilaʻ		ဒုတိယအရာခံဗိုလ် dautaiya ’araākhaṃ bauilaʻ		အုပ်ခွဲတပ်ကြပ်ကြီး aupaʻ khavai tapaʻ karpaʻ karīʺ		တပ်ကြပ်ကြီး tapaʻ karpaʻ karīʺ					တပ်ကြပ် tapaʻ karpaʻ		ဒုတိယတပ်ကြပ် dautaiya tapaʻ karpaʻ			တပ်သား tapaʻ saāʺ	တပ်သားသစ် tapaʻ saāʺ sacaʻ
Nepal	No navy
Royal Navy of Oman
Royal Navy of Oman	وكيل أول; Wakil 'awal		وكيل; Wakil				رقيب أول; Raqib 'awal		رقيب; Raqib					عريف; Earif	نائب عريف; Nayib earif
Pakistan Navy																	No insignia
Pakistan Navy	Master chief petty officer ماسٹر چیف پیٹی آفیسر		Fleet chief petty officer فلیٹ چیف پیٹی آفیسر		Chief petty officer چیف پیٹی آفیسر		Petty officer چھوٹا افسر					Leading seaman معروف سی مین			Able seaman قابل ملاح		Ordinary seaman عام سی مین
Philippine Navy
Philippine Navy	Master chief petty officer	Senior chief petty officer	Chief petty officer		Petty officer, first class		Petty officer, second class		Petty officer, third class			Seaman first class			Seaman second class		Apprentice seaman
Qatari Emiri Navy															No insignia
Qatari Emiri Navy	وكيل اول; Wakil awwal		وكيل ثاني; Wakil thani		رقيب; Raqib		نائب; Nayib					عريف; Earif		وكيل عريف; Wakil earif	جندي; Jundi
Russian Navy
Russian Navy	Старший мичман Starshy michman	Мичман; Michman	Главный корабельный старшина Glavny korabelny starshina		Главный старшина Glavny starshina		Старшина 1 статьи Starshina 1 statji		Старшина 2 статьи Starshina 2 statji			Старший матрос Starshy matros		Матрос; Matros
Royal Saudi Navy																	No insignia
Royal Saudi Navy			رقيب أول; Raqib 'awal		رقيب; Raqib		وكيل رقيب; Wakil raqib					عريف; Earif			جندي أول; Jundiun awwal		جندي; Jundiun
Republic of Singapore Navy																	No Insignia	No Insignia
Republic of Singapore Navy	Master sergeant		Staff sergeant		First sergeant		Second sergeant		Third sergeant			Corporal first class	Corporal	Lance corporal	Private first class		Private	Recruit
Sri Lanka Navy														No insignia			No insignia
Sri Lanka Navy	Master chief petty officer		Fleet chief petty officer		Chief petty officer		Petty officer					Leading seaman		Able seaman			Seaman recruit
Syrian Navy																	No insignia
Syrian Navy	مساعد أول; Musaeid 'awal	مساعد ثاني; Musaeid thani	مساعد; Musaeid		رقيب أول; Raqib 'awal		رقيب ثاني; Raqib thani		رقيب; Raqib			عريف; Earif			جندي أول; Jundiun 'awal		جندي; Jundiun
Rank group	Senior NCOs											Junior NCOs			Enlisted
Tajikistan	No navy
Royal Thai Navy																	No insignia
Royal Thai Navy	พันจ่าเอก; Phan cha ek		พันจ่าโท; Phan cha tho		พันจ่าตรี Phan cha tri				จ่าเอก; Cha ek			จ่าโท; Cha tho		จ่าตรี Cha tri			พลทหาร; Phon thahan
Timor-Leste Navy																	Trade insignia in red on a black backing
Timor-Leste Navy	Sargento-mor		Sargento-chefe		Sargento-ajudante		Primeiro-sargento		Segundo-sargento	Primerio-subsargento	Segundo-subsargento	Cabo		Primeiro-marinheiro	Segundo-marinheiro		Grumete
Turkmen Naval Forces
Turkmen Naval Forces			Baş gämi starşinasy		Baş starşina		Birinji basgançakly starşina		Ikinji basgançakly starşina					Matros
United Arab Emirates Navy																	No insignia
United Arab Emirates Navy			مساعد أول; Musa'id 'awal		مساعد; Musa'id				رقیب; Raqib			عريف; Earif			جندي أول; Jundi awwal		جندي; Jundi
Uzbek River Force
Uzbek River Force					Bosh starshina		I darajali starshina	II darajali starshina	III darajali starshina		Starshina			Matros
Vietnam People's Navy
Vietnam People's Navy			Thượng sĩ				Trung sĩ					Hạ sĩ			Binh nhất		Binh nhì
Vietnam Coast Guard
Vietnam Coast Guard			Thượng sĩ				Trung sĩ					Hạ sĩ			Binh nhất		Binh nhì
Yemeni Navy
Yemeni Navy	Warrant officer				Petty officer first class		Petty officer second class					Petty officer third class		Seaman
Rank group	Senior NCOs											Junior NCOs			Enlisted

== See also ==
- Comparative navy officer ranks of Asia
