= Comparative navy enlisted ranks of the Commonwealth =

Rank comparison chart of naval forces of Commonwealth of Nations states.

== Enlisted ==
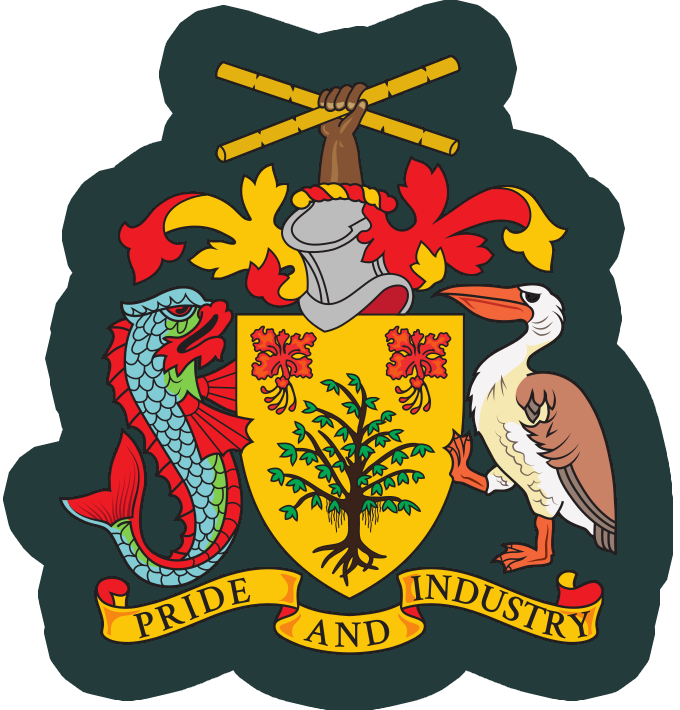
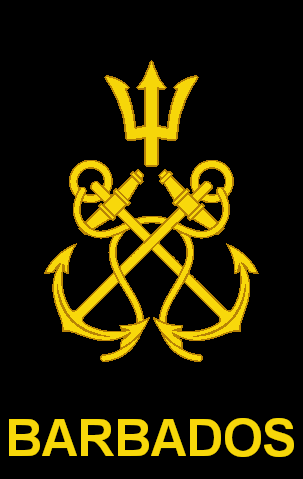
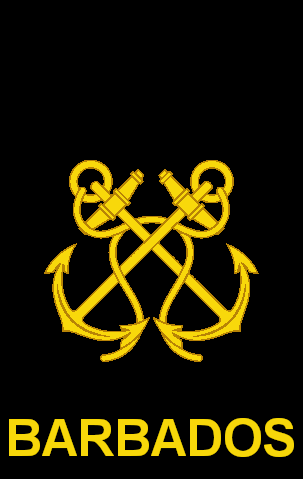
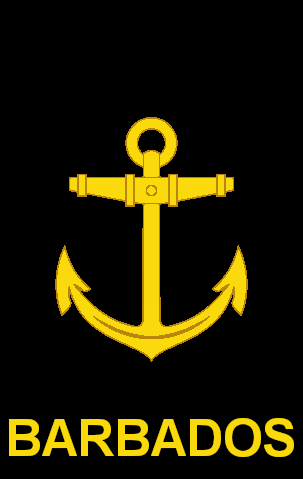
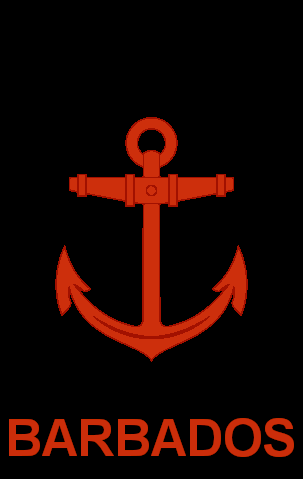
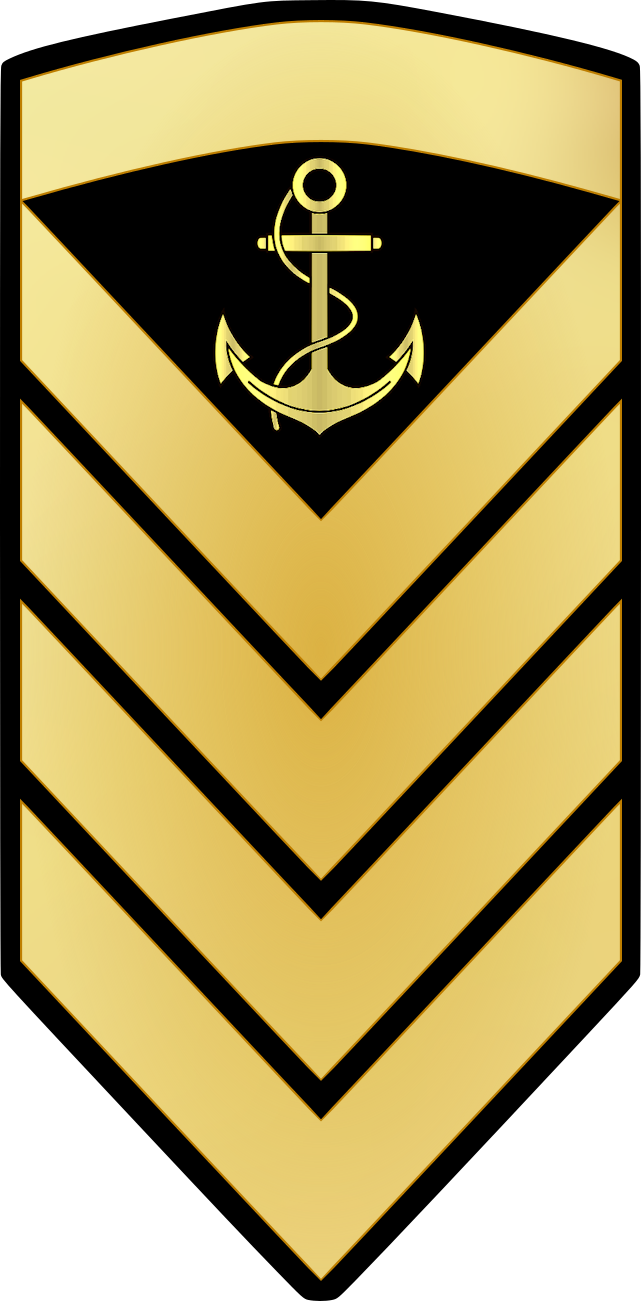
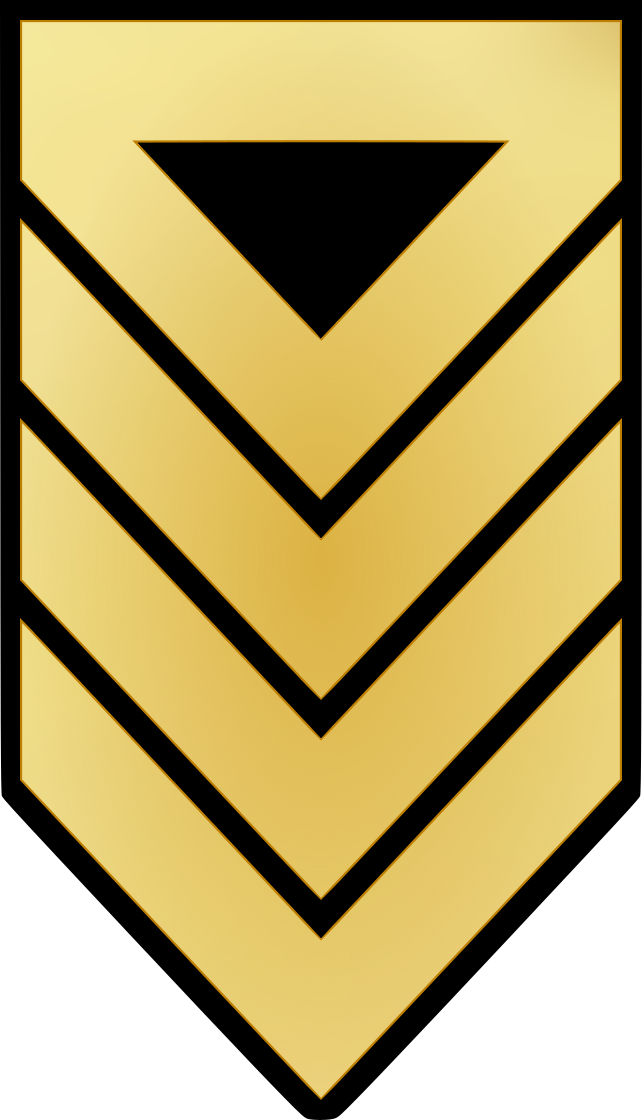
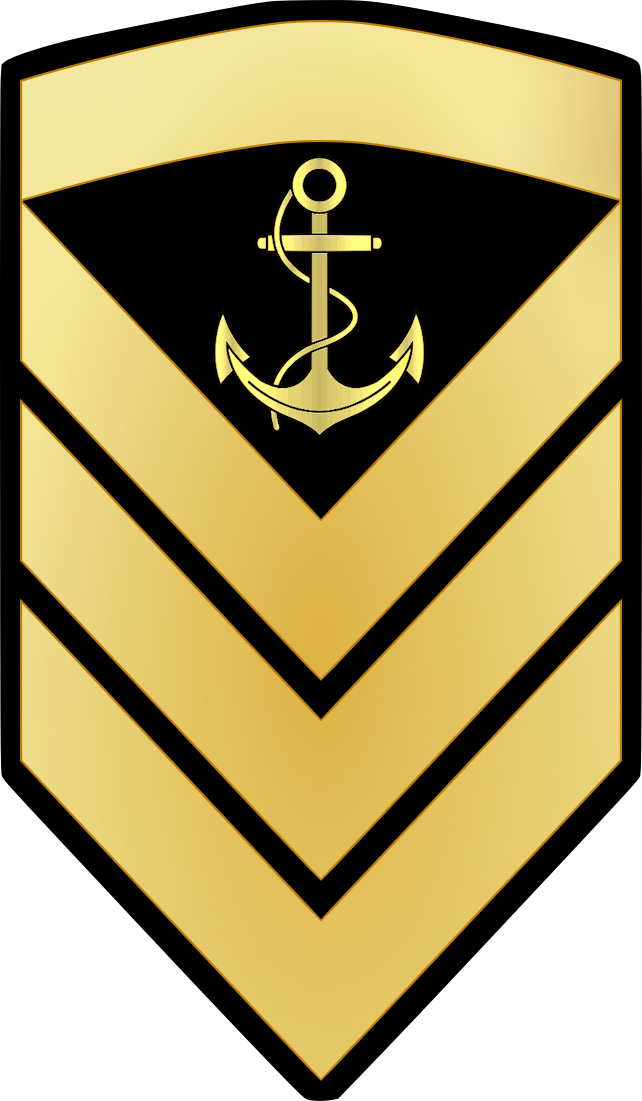
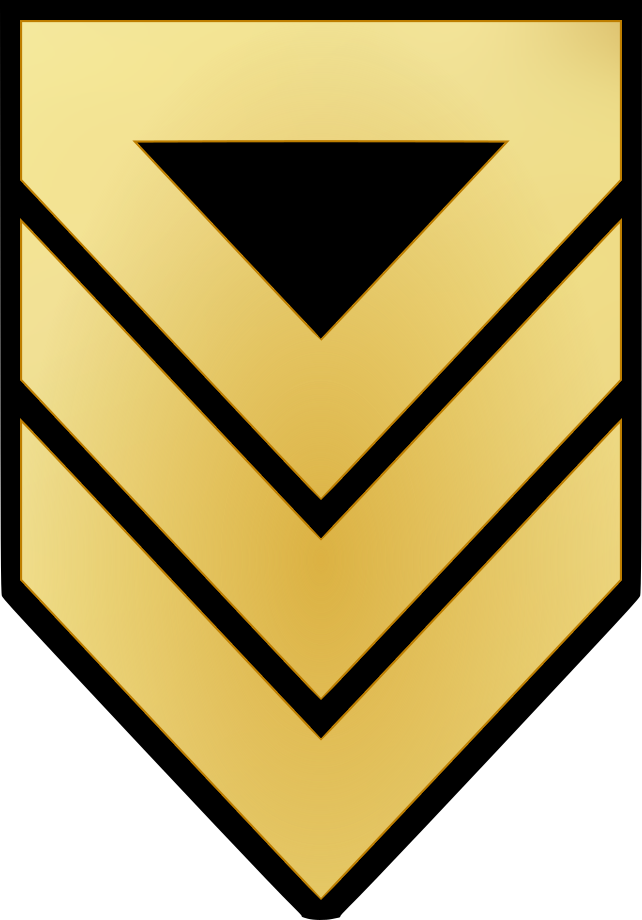
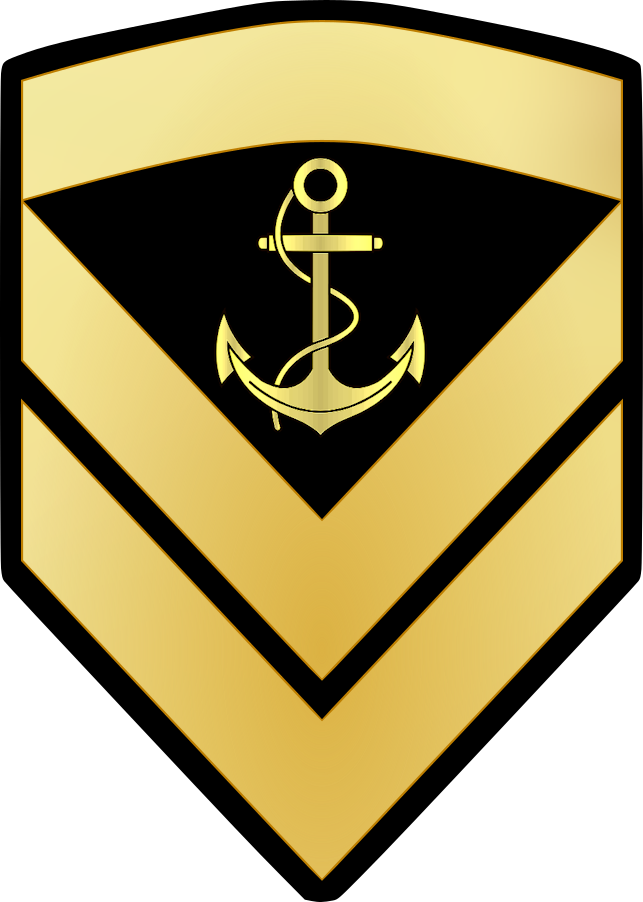
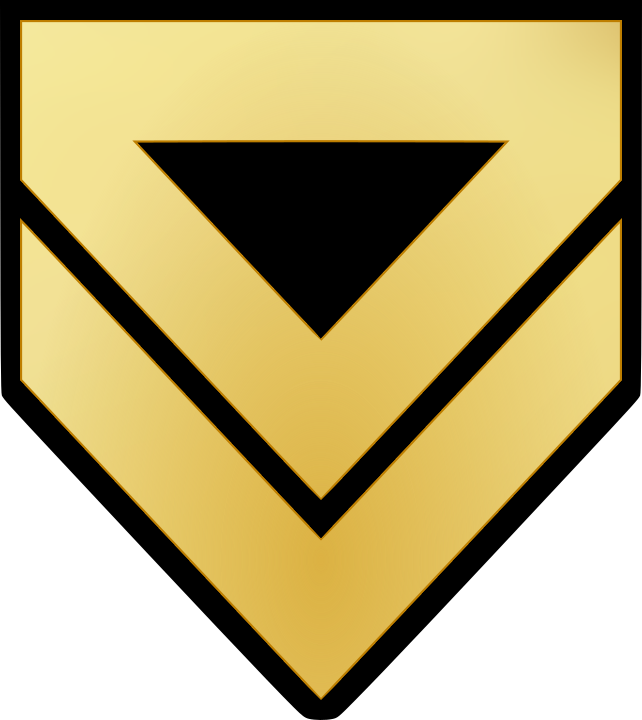
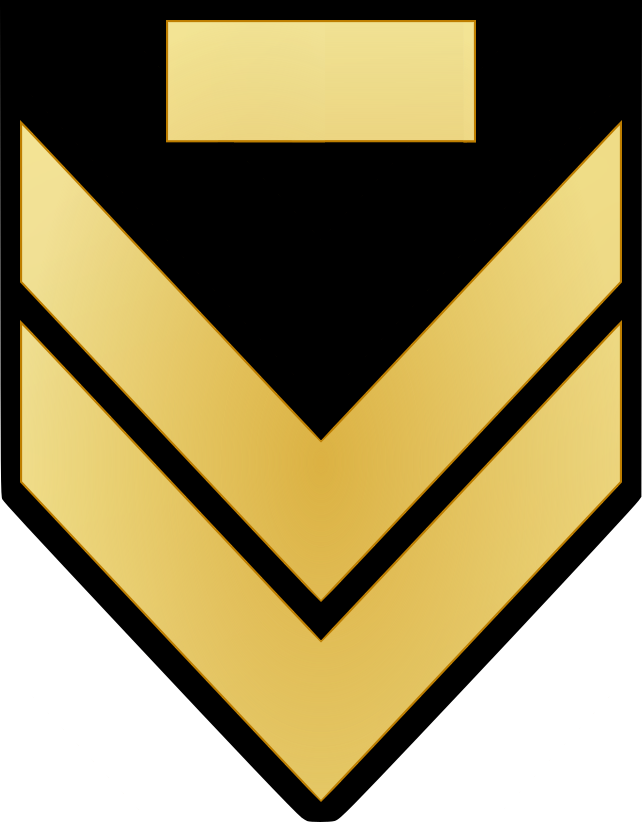
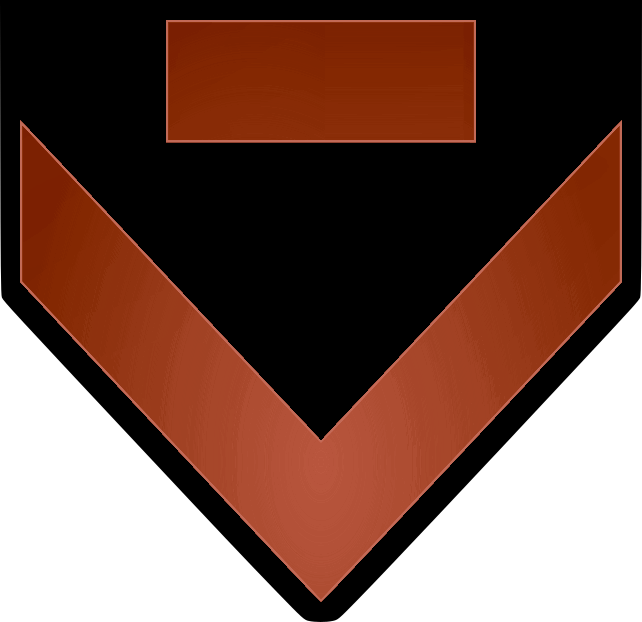
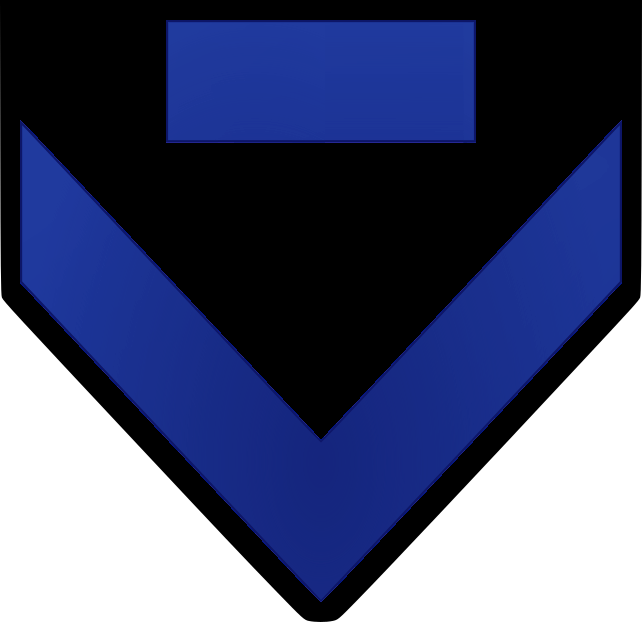
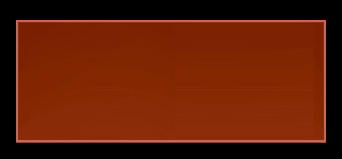
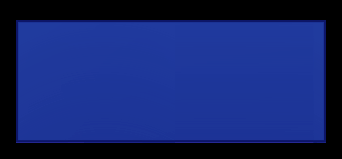
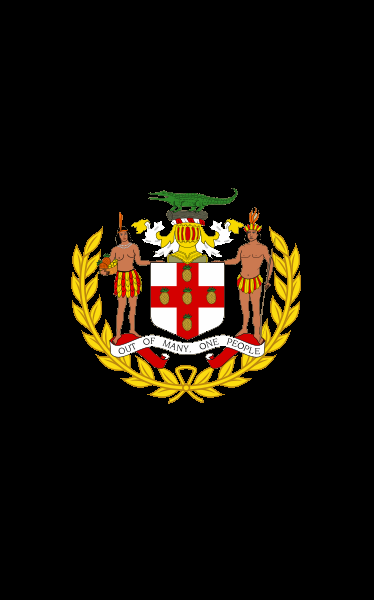
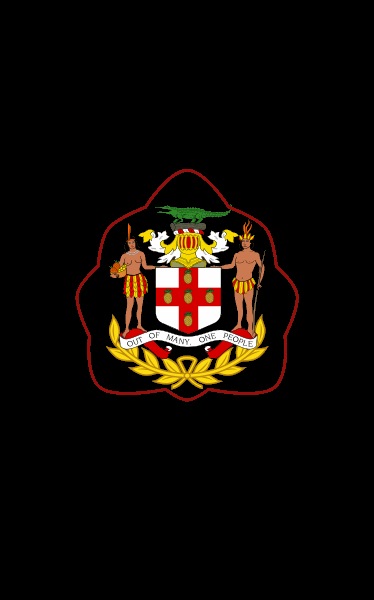
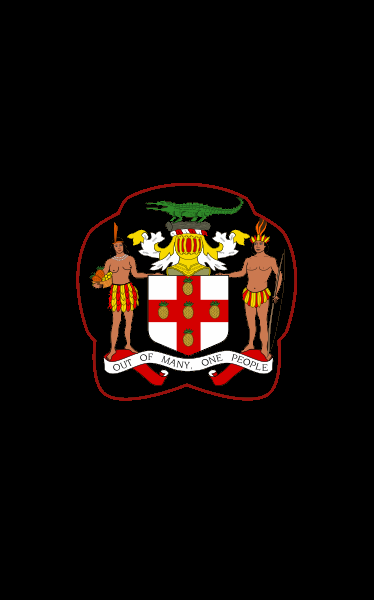
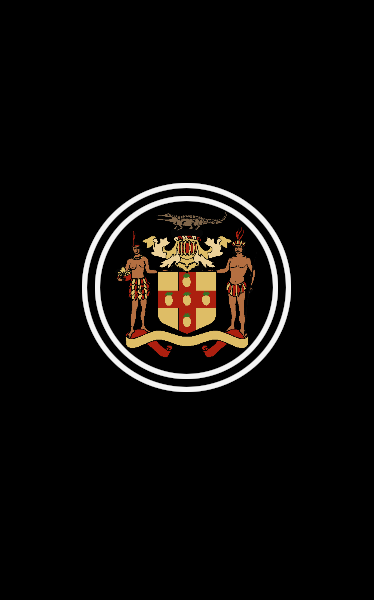
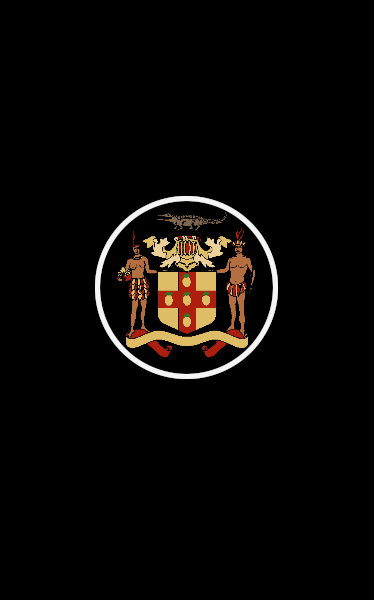
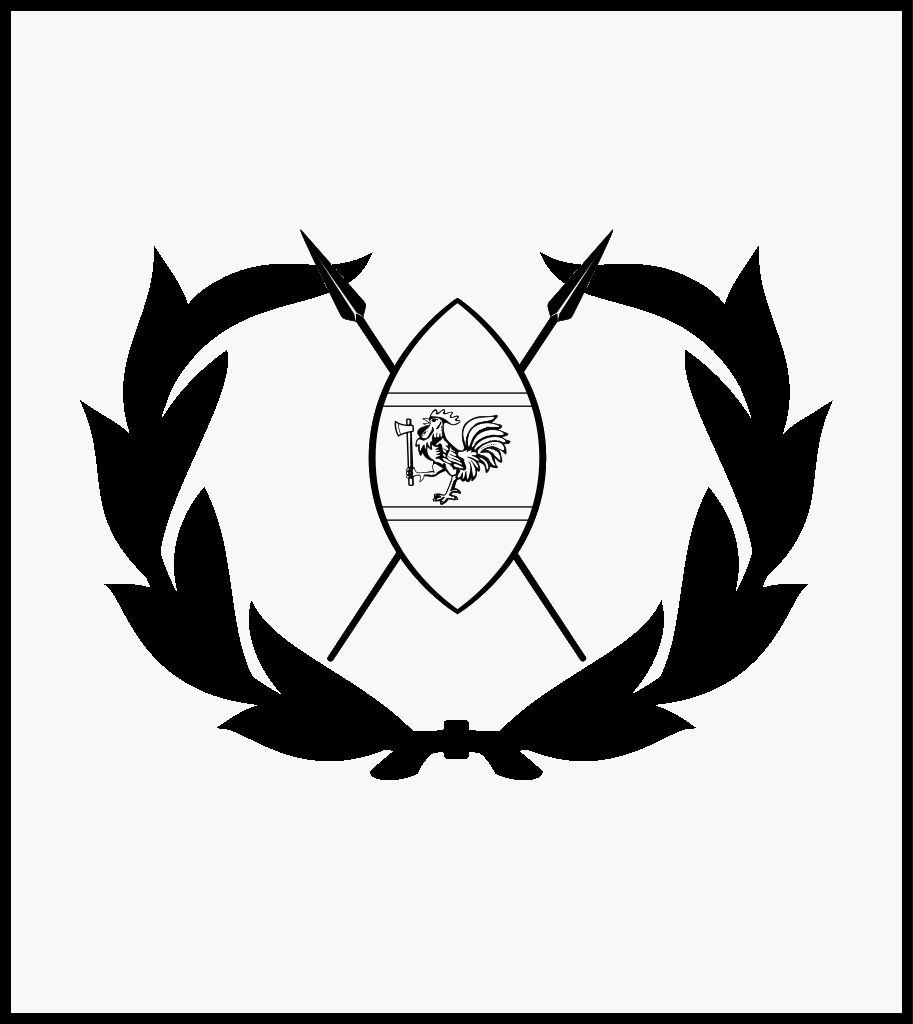
Rank group	Senior NCOs						Junior NCOs			Enlisted
Antigua and Barbuda Coast Guard
Antigua and Barbuda Coast Guard	Master chief petty officer class 1		Master chief petty officer class 2	Chief petty officer	Petty officer		Leading seaman			Able seaman
Royal Australian Navy
Royal Australian Navy	Warrant Officer of the Navy	Warrant officer	Chief petty officer		Petty officer		Leading seaman			Able seaman		Seaman
Royal Bahamas Defence Force												No insignia
Royal Bahamas Defence Force	Force chief petty officer			Chief petty officer	Petty officer		Leading marine			Able marine		Marine
Bangladesh Navy									No insignia			No insignia
Bangladesh Navy	মাস্টার চীফ পেটি অফিসার; Māsṭār chīph pēṭi ôphisār		সিনিয়র চীফ পেটি অফিসার; Siniẏar chīph pēṭi ôphisār	চীফ পেটি অফিসার; Chīph pēṭi ôphisār	পেটি অফিসার; Pēṭi ôphisār		লিডিং সীম্যান; Liḍiṁ sīmaen		এ্যাবল সীম্যান; Ēyābal sīmaen			অর্ডিনারী সিম্যান; Ôrḍinārī simaen
Barbados Coast Guard												No insignia
Barbados Coast Guard	Master chief petty officer class 1		Master chief petty officer class 2	Chief petty officer	Petty officer		Leading seaman			Able seaman		Seaman
Belize Coast Guard
Belize Coast Guard	Master chief petty officer		Senior chief petty officer	Chief petty officer	Petty officer first class	Petty officer second class	Petty officer third class		Seaman	Seaman apprentice
Botswana	No navy
Royal Brunei Navy										No insignia
Royal Brunei Navy	Pegawai waran 1		Pegawai waran 2	Bintara kanan	Bintara		Laskar kanan		Laskar muda	Prebet/Soldadu
Cameroon Navy
Cameroon Navy	Maître principal		Premier maître		Maître	Second-maître	Quartier-maître de 1^{ère} classe		Quartier-maître de 2^{ème} classe	Matelot de 1^{re} classe		Matelot
Royal Canadian Navy
Royal Canadian Navy	Chief petty officer 1st class		Chief petty officer 2nd class	Petty officer 1st class	Petty officer 2nd class		Master sailor		Sailor 1st class	Sailor 2nd class		Sailor 3rd class
Royal Canadian Navy	Premier(ère) maître de 1^{re} classe		Premier(ère) maître de 2^{e} classe	Maître de 1^{re} classe	Maître de 2^{e} classe		Matelot-chef		Matelot de 1^{re} classe	Matelot de 2^{e} classe		Matelot de 3^{e} classe
Cyprus Navy												Arm/corps insignia only
Cyprus Navy	Ανθυπασπιστής; Anthypaspistís		Αρχικελευστής; Archikelefstís	Επικελευστής; Epikelefstís	Κελευστής; Kelefstís		Δίοπος; Díopos		Υποδίοπος; Ypodíopos			Ναύτης; Náftis
Dominica	No navy
Eswatini	No navy
Republic of Fiji Navy												No insignia
Republic of Fiji Navy	Warrant officer class 1		Warrant officer class 2	Chief petty officer	Petty officer		Leading seaman					Ordinary seaman
Gabonese Navy
Gabonese Navy	Maître-principal major	Maître-principal	Premier maître		Maître	Second maître	Quartier-maître de 1^{ère} classe		Quartier-maître de 2^{ème} classe	Matelot brevet		Matelot
Ghana Navy										No insignia		No insignia
Ghana Navy				Chief petty officer	Petty officer first class	Petty officer second class	Leading seaman			Able seaman		Ordinary seaman
Grenada	No navy
Guyana Coast Guard
Guyana Coast Guard	Fleet chief petty officer		Chief petty officer	Senior petty officer	Petty officer		Leading seaman			Able seaman
Indian Navy										No insignia
Indian Navy	Master chief petty officer I मास्टर चीफ पेटी ऑफिसर फर्स्ट क्लास		Master chief petty officer II मास्टर चीफ पेटी ऑफिसर सेकेंड क्लास	Chief petty officer चीफ पेटी ऑफिसर	Petty officer पेटी ऑफिसर		Leading Seaman लीडिंग सीमैन			Seaman Ist class सीमैन फर्स्ट क्लास		Seaman IInd class सीमैन सेकंड क्लास
Rank group	Senior NCOs						Junior NCOs			Enlisted
Jamaican Coast Guard												No insignia
Jamaican Coast Guard	Master chief petty officer 1		Master chief petty officer	Chief petty officer	Petty officer		Leading seaman			Able seaman		Ordinary seaman
Kenya Navy										No insignia
Kenya Navy	Warrant officer class 1		Warrant officer class 2	Senior sergeant	Sergeant		Corporal			Private (or equivalent)
Kiribati	No navy
Lesotho	No navy
Royal Malaysian Navy												No insignia
Royal Malaysian Navy	Pegawai Waran I		Pegawai Waran II	Bintara Kanan	Bintara Muda		Laskar Kanan		Laskar Kelas I	Laskar Kelas II		Perajurit Muda
Maritime Squadron of Malta										No insignia
Maritime Squadron of Malta	Warrant Officer Class 1		Warrant Officer Class 2	Staff Sergeant	Sergeant		Bombardier		Lance Bombardier	Gunner (or equivalent)
Mauritius	No navy
Mozambique Naval Command
Mozambique Naval Command				Intendente	Primeiro-sargento	Segundo-sargento				Primeiro-cabo	Segundo-cabo	Marinheiro
Namibian Navy										No insignia
Namibian Navy	Warrant officer class 1		Warrant officer class 2	Chief petty officer	Petty officer		Leading seaman		Able seaman	Seaman
Namibian Marine Corps										No insignia
Namibian Marine Corps	Warrant officer class 1		Warrant officer class 2	Chief petty officer	Petty officer		Leading seaman		Able seaman	Seaman
Nauru	No navy
Royal New Zealand Navy
Royal New Zealand Navy	Warrant officer			Chief petty officer	Petty officer		Leading hand			Able rate		Ordinary rate
Nigerian Navy												No insignia
Nigerian Navy	Navy Warrant Officer	Master Warrant Officer	Warrant Officer		Petty officer		Leading seaman		Able seaman	Seaman		Ordinary seaman
Pakistan Navy												No insignia
Pakistan Navy	Master chief petty officer ماسٹر چیف پیٹی آفیسر		Fleet chief petty officer فلیٹ چیف پیٹی آفیسر	Chief petty officer چیف پیٹی آفیسر	Petty officer چھوٹا افسر		Leading seaman معروف سی مین			Able seaman قابل ملاح		Ordinary seaman عام سی مین
Papua New Guinea Maritime Element												No insignia
Papua New Guinea Maritime Element	Warrant officer			Chief petty officer	Petty officer		Leading seaman			Able seaman		Seaman
Rwanda	No navy
Rank group	Senior NCOs						Junior NCOs			Enlisted
Saint Lucia	No navy
Saint Vincent and the Grenadines	No navy
Samoa	No navy
Seychelles Coast Guard										No insignia
Seychelles Coast Guard	Warrant officer class 1		Warrant officer class 2	Staff sergeant	Sergeant		Corporal		Lance corporal	Private (or equivalent)
Sierra Leone Navy
Sierra Leone Navy	Warrant officer class 1		Warrant officer class 2	Chief petty officer	Petty officer		Leading seaman			Able seaman		Seaman
Republic of Singapore Navy												No Insignia	No Insignia
Republic of Singapore Navy	Master sergeant		Staff sergeant	First sergeant	Second sergeant	Third sergeant	Corporal first class	Corporal	Lance corporal	Private first class		Private	Recruit
Solomon Islands	No army
South African Navy
South African Navy	Warrant officer class 1		Warrant officer class 2	Chief petty officer	Petty officer		Leading seaman			Able seaman		Seaman
Sri Lanka Navy									No insignia			No insignia
Sri Lanka Navy	Master chief petty officer		Fleet chief petty officer	Chief petty officer	Petty officer		Leading seaman		Able seaman			Seaman recruit
(Eswatini) Swaziland	No navy
Tanzania Naval Command										No insignia
Tanzania Naval Command	Afisa mteule daraja la kwanza		Afisa mteule daraja la pili	Sajinitaji	Sajenti		Koplo		Koplo usu	Mtu ndege
Togolese Navy												No insignia
Togolese Navy	Major	Maître principal	Premier-maître		Maître	Second-maître	Quartier-maitre de 1^{ère} classe		Quartier-maitre de 2^{ème} classe	Matelot de 1^{ère} classe		Matelot de 2^{ème} classe
Tongan Navy										No insignia
Tongan Navy	Warrant officer class 1		Warrant officer class 2	Staff sergeant	Sergeant		Corporal		Lance corporal	Private
Trinidad and Tobago Coast Guard										No insignia		No insignia
Trinidad and Tobago Coast Guard	Fleet chief petty officer		Chief petty officer		Petty officer		Leading seaman			Able seaman		Ordinary seaman
Tuvalu	No navy
Uganda	No navy
Royal Navy
Royal Navy	Warrant officer class 1		Warrant officer class 2	Chief petty officer	Petty officer		Leading rate			Able rate
Royal Marines										No insignia
Royal Marines	Warrant officer class 1		Warrant officer class 2	Colour sergeant	Sergeant		Corporal		Lance corporal	Marine
Vanuatu Maritime Wing
Vanuatu Maritime Wing				Senior sergeant Long sajen	Sergeant; Sajen		Corporal; Kofol			Constable; Polis		Recruit; Rikrut
Zambia	No navy
Rank group	Senior NCOs						Junior NCOs			Enlisted

== See also ==
- Comparative navy officer ranks of the Commonwealth
- Ranks and insignia of NATO navies' officers
