= Able seaman (rank) =

Military rank used in naval forces

Able seaman is a military rank used in some navies.

== Australia ==
In the Royal Australian Navy, able seaman (AB) is the second-lowest of the non-commissioned member ranks, ranking above seaman and below leading seaman.

Able seaman is the equivalent rank to Leading aircraftman, in the Royal Australian Air Force and Private Proficient in the Australian Army. It is not equivalent to Lance Corporal which is rated as E4, not E3 like the ranks of Able Seaman and Leading Aircraftsman.

Able Seamen with additional skills are denoted by modifications to the "AB" rank; for example photography skills which are acknowledged in the title Able Seaman Imagery Specialist, or ABIS.

== Canada ==
In the Royal Canadian Navy, sailor second class (previously able seaman until August 2020) is the second-lowest of the non-commissioned member ranks, ranking above sailor third class and below sailor first class. Sailors second class wear a single gold chevron, point down, as an insignia of rank; it is worn on the upper part of both sleeves of the service dress tunic, and on slip-ons on both shoulders on other uniforms.

In all trades, the rank is awarded on completion of 30 months of service, by which time all initial training is completed. Consequently, it is sometimes said that promotion to the rank of sailor second class means the recipient has lost their 'best excuse', on the theory that sailors third class are generally assumed to know nothing.

Sailor second class is the equivalent rank to private (trained), or simply private, in the Army and aviator (trained) in Air Force. In French the rank is called matelot de 2^{e} classe.

In August 2020, the Royal Canadian Navy replaced the term seaman with the gender-neutral term sailor. Able seamen are now referred to as "sailor second class".

== United Kingdom ==
In 1653 the Royal Navy introduced a new pay scale as part of reforms following defeat in the Battle of Dungeness the previous year. Included in these reforms were, for the first time, separate pay scales for more experienced seamen that distinguished between an ordinary seaman and an able seaman. The higher ranked able seaman was required to be competent in steering, use of the lead and working aloft, and received about 25% higher pay than an ordinary seaman.

In the middle of the 18th century the term "able seaman" (abbreviated AB) referred to a seaman with more than two years experience at sea and considered "well acquainted with his duty". Seamen with less experience were referred to as landsmen (for the first year at sea) or ordinary seamen (for the second).

In time of war (such as the Seven Years' War or the Napoleonic Wars), with many more warships in service, the navy, merchant marine, and privateers competed ferociously for the limited pool of able seamen, leading to the unpopular use of impressment by the Royal Navy to maintain its ships' complements. In peacetime, with fewer active warships, there was usually a surplus of unemployed able seamen willing to work in the navy. As late as the Napoleonic Wars, the Royal Navy's practice of stopping American ships to press American sailors into involuntary service was one of the main factors leading to the War of 1812 with the United States.

== Gallery ==
Able seaman
(Antigua and Barbuda Coast Guard)

Able seaman
(Royal Australian Navy)

Able marine
(Royal Bahamas Defence Force)

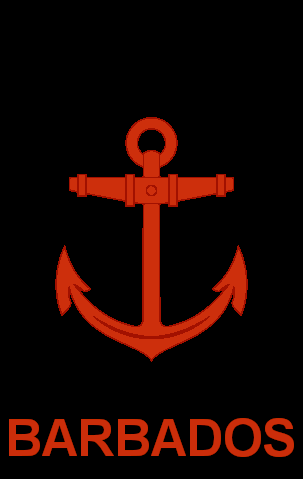
Able seaman
(Barbados Coast Guard)

ኤብል ሲማን
Ēbili sīmani
(Ethiopian Navy)

Able seaman
(Guyana Coast Guard)

Able seaman
Irish: Mairnéalach inniúil
(Irish Naval Service)

Able seaman
(Jamaican Coast Guard)

Able seaman
(Namibian Navy)

Able rate
(Royal New Zealand Navy)

Able seaman
(Nigerian Navy)

Able seaman
(Papua New Guinea Maritime Element)

Able seaman
(Sierra Leone Navy)

Able seaman
(South African Navy)

Able seaman
(Royal Navy)
