= Fleet chief petty officer =

Fleet chief petty officer is a non-commissioned naval rank, typically senior to chief petty officer and ranking with army warrant officers.

== Pakistan ==
Fleet chief petty officer is a commissioned and gazetted rank in the Pakistan Navy above chief petty officer and below master chief petty officer. It is equivalent to the Pakistan Air Force warrant officer and the Pakistan Army subedar.

== Sri Lanka ==
Fleet chief petty officer is the second highest non-commissioned rank in the Sri Lanka Navy above chief petty officer and below master chief petty officer. It is equivalent to the Sri Lankan Army Warrant officer class II and the Sri Lanka Air Force warrant officer.

== United Kingdom ==
Fleet chief petty officer (FCPO), commonly known as fleet chief, was introduced in 1971 as the highest non-commissioned rate in the British Royal Navy. It was equivalent to warrant officer class 1 in the British Army, regimental sergeant major (later warrant officer class 1) in the Royal Marines and warrant officer in the Royal Air Force and wore the same rank badge, the royal coat of arms on the lower sleeve or epaulettes and its own cap badge. Like warrant officers in the other services, they were addressed as "Mr" by officers and "Sir" by subordinates. A chief petty officer with at least three years' service in the rate was eligible for promotion. The equivalent in the Women's Royal Naval Service was fleet chief wren. In 1985, it was replaced by the rate of warrant officer.

== Insignia ==
Pakistan Navy

Sri Lanka Navy

Royal Navy

== See also ==
- Warrant officer
