= Leading seaman =

Military rank

Leading seaman is a junior non-commissioned rank or rate in navies, particularly those of the Commonwealth. When it is used by NATO nations, leading seaman has the rank code of OR-4. It is often equivalent to the army and air force rank of corporal and some navies use corporal rather than leading seaman.

The rank is used in the navies of Australia, Bangladesh, Canada (Sailor First Class), Finland, Ghana, Greece, India, Ireland, Namibia, New Zealand, Norway, Pakistan, South Africa, Sri Lanka and the United Kingdom.

== Australia ==
The badge in the Royal Australian Navy is the fouled anchor over the word "Australia", worn on the shoulders, or the fouled anchor worn on the left sleeve, depending on what uniform is worn at the time. It is senior to able seaman but junior to petty officer. Leading seaman or leading hand, which it is also known as, is the equivalent of corporal in the Royal Australian Air Force and the Australian Army. Leading seamen are addressed as "leader", and informally known as "kellicks" (rather than "killick") from the kellick anchor which is the symbol of their rank.

== Canada ==
In the Royal Canadian Navy, sailor first class (previously leading seaman until August 2020) is senior to the rank of sailor second class, and junior to master sailor (which is actually an appointment of sailor first class). Its Army and Air Force equivalent is corporal, and it is part of the cadre of junior non-commissioned officers.

The slang term for the rank is "killick", as in the Royal Navy. The term is still used even though the old-style insignia of a fouled anchor is no longer used for this rank in the RCN.

Sailors first class generally mess and billet with sailors second and third class and with their army and air force equivalents: privates, corporals, and master corporals. Their mess on naval bases or installations is generally named the "junior ranks mess".

As of August 2020, the Royal Canadian Navy replaced the term seaman with the gender-neutral term sailor. Leading seamen are now referred to as "sailor first class" (often abbreviated as "S1").

Sleeve rank insignia of a sailor first class (leading seaman) of the Royal Canadian Navy

== Greece ==
In the Hellenic Navy, leading seaman (Greek: Δίοπος, romanized: Diopos) is senior to the rank of seaman (Greek: Ναύτης, romanized: Naftis) and junior to chief petty officer (Greek: Κελευστής, romanized: Kelefstis).

Sleeve rank insignia of a leading seaman (diopos) of the Hellenic Navy (male)

Sleeve rank insignia of a leading seaman (diopos) of the Hellenic Navy (female)

== The Soviet Union and Russia ==
The shoulder board of a Russian leading seaman

"Leading seaman" (Russian: старший матрос, romanized: starshy matros; literally "senior seaman") is a naval enlisted rank of the Navy of the Russian Federation. It is senior to the lowest rank of "seaman" (Russian: матрос, romanized: matros). The rank was introduced to the Soviet Navy in 1946 and inherited by the Russian state in 1991.

The former Soviet republics of Belarus and Ukraine maintain similar ranks with the same pronunciation but slightly different orthography - старшы матрос (Belarus) and старший матрос (Ukraine).

== United Kingdom ==
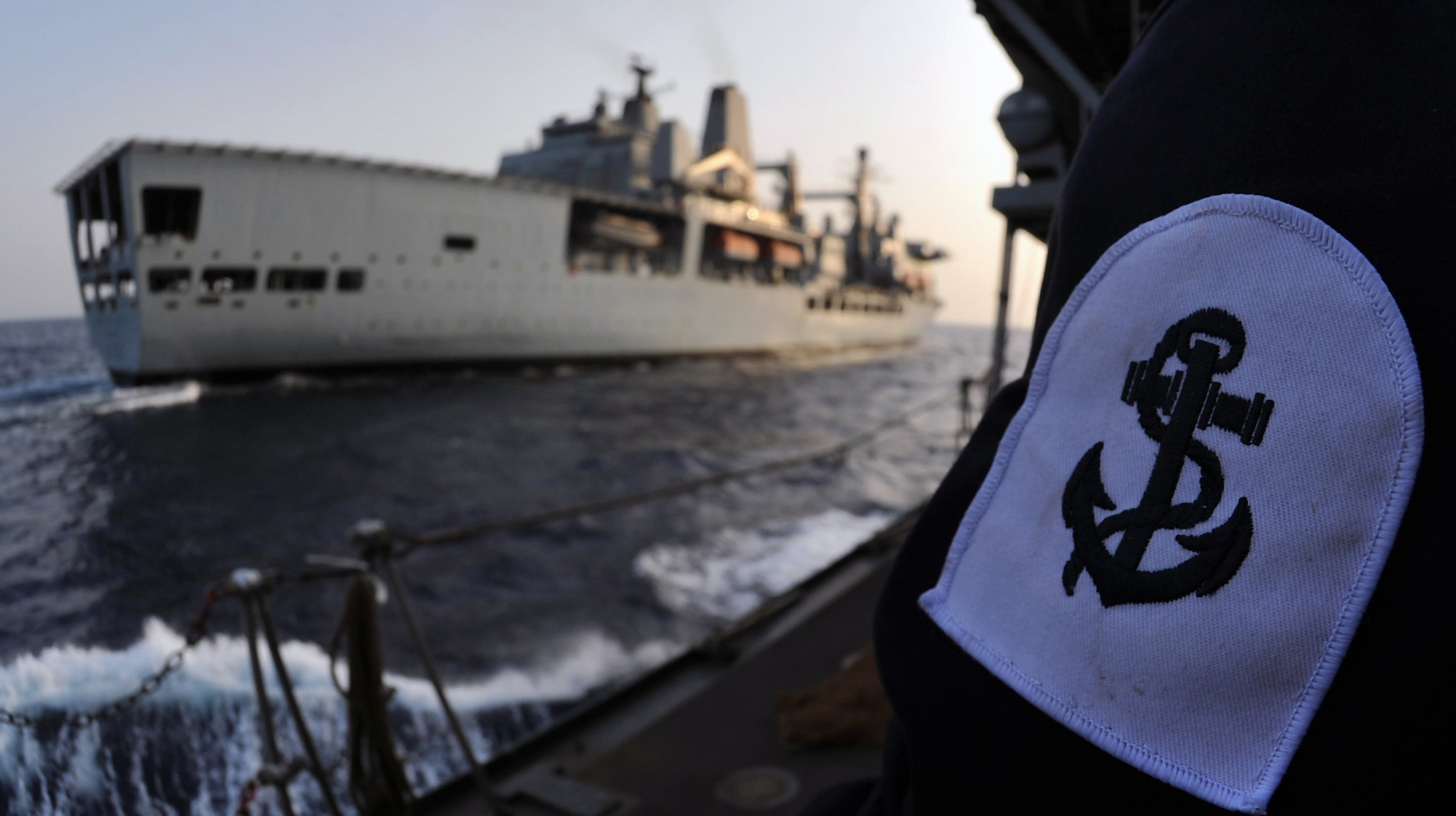
The badge of a Royal Navy leading seaman

The rate of leading seaman, leading hand or leading rating in the Royal Navy is senior to able seaman and junior to petty officer. It is equivalent to corporal in the other services. The badge is the fouled anchor (an anchor with a length of rope twisted around it), worn on the upper left arm in formal uniform, white front (only when in formal uniform) or overalls and on the shoulder slides in working dress, although this was previously updated to a single hook in the chest centre on the Personal Clothing System (PCS) before reverting to previous iterations.

Specialists use the word "leading" before their speciality (for example, leading writer, leading cook, leading regulator).

A leading rating is often called a "killick", referring to the rank insignia of a fouled anchor.

== United States ==
In the United States Navy, the position of leading seaman is usually that of the seniormost seaman (E-3) in the division. The rank equivalent of a leading seaman is a petty officer third class (E-4), although the leading seaman only has the authority of a PO3, not the rank. The leading seaman position is usually used when a PO3 or PO2 is not available.

== Venezuela ==
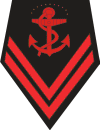
Venezuelan insignia

The rank is used by the National Bolivarian Armed Forces of Venezuela.

== See also ==
- Non-commissioned member
- Seaman
- Non-commissioned officer
