= Ranks and insignia of the officers of the Royal Navy =

These are the official Royal Navy Officer ranks ordered by rank. These ranks are now part of the NATO/United Kingdom ranks, including modern and past.

== Insignia ==
=== Uniform insignia ===
Rank insignia of the commissioned officers of the Royal Navy
Rank group	Officers of flag rank (Note: When in a command appointment, these officers are known as 'flag officers'. When not in a command appointment, they are known as 'officers of flag rank'.)				Senior officers				Junior officers			Officer cadets
NATO code	OF-10	OF-9	OF-8	OF-7	OF-6	OF-5	OF-4	OF-3	OF-2	OF-1		N/A
Insignia												
Rank	Admiral of the fleet (Note: Shown with the royal cypher of Charles III. The rank of admiral of the fleet has become an honorary/posthumous rank, war time rank; ceremonial rank; regular appointments ended in 1995.)	Admiral	Vice admiral	Rear admiral	Commodore	Captain	Commander	Lieutenant commander	Lieutenant	Sub-lieutenant	Midshipman	Officer cadet
Abbreviation	AdmF	Adm	VAdm	RAdm	Cdre	Capt	Cdr	Lt Cdr	Lt	Sub Lt / SLt	Mid	OC

Rank insignia of the commissioned officers of the Royal Marines
Rank group	General officers			Field officers				Junior officers			Officer cadets
NATO code	OF-9	OF-8	OF-7	OF-6	OF-5	OF-4	OF-3	OF-2	OF-1		N/A
Insignia											
Rank	General	Lieutenant-general	Major-general	Brigadier	Colonel	Lieutenant colonel	Major	Captain	Lieutenant	Second lieutenant	Officer cadet
Abbreviation	Gen	Lt Gen	Maj Gen	Brig	Col	Lt Col	Maj	Capt	Lt	2Lt	OCdt

The Royal Marines are part of His Majesty's Naval Service but use the same rank structure as the British Army, save for the field marshal rank. Officers in the Royal Marines wear the same rank insignia as their army counterparts but their insignia is smaller at 5/8 inch (16 mm) in diameter. Commissioned officers below the rank of colonel wear the initials 'RM' below their rank insignia.

The major general rank since 1996 is the highest rank of the officer corps, but in the past, generals and lieutenant generals headed the Corps, and from 1857 to 1957 the Corps also had the unique ranks of colonel second commandant and colonel commandant. Rank insignia are on brown or dark blue shoulder boards in all dresses save for the combat and barracks duty dress uniforms. From 1911 to 1957 the officer corps even included warrant officers and commissioned warrant officers in the same way as the RN. Although the Royal Marines does not officially use the rank of field marshal, the Captain General Royal Marines, the ceremonial head of the corps, wears a field marshal's rank insignia.

Historical ranks in italic:

- Warrant officer
- Commissioned warrant officer
- Probationary second lieutenant
- Probationary lieutenant
- Ensign
- Second lieutenant
- Lieutenant
- Captain lieutenant
- Second captain
- Captain
- Junior major
- Senior major
- Major
- Lieutenant colonel
- Colonel
- Colonel second commandant
- Colonel commandant - replaced by 1957 with brigadier
- Brigadier - acting rank, an appointment for colonels. until 1997
- Brigadier general - temporary appointment rather than substantive rank. used from 1913 to 1921
- Major general
- Lieutenant general
- General

=== Distinguishing flags and broad pennants ===
When in command, Flag officers are to fly the distinguishing flag appropriate to their rank, whilst commodores in command are to fly a broad pennant. Officers entitled to fly such a flag afloat are also to fly their flag ashore at their headquarters or another designated location. Flag officers may hoist their flag whilst aboard any of His Majesty's Ships, whilst commodores may only fly their broad pennant aboard the ship to which they have been appointed.

Admirals of the fleet, former first sea lords and admirals who are or have been chief of the defence staff fly the Union Jack as their distinguishing flag whilst aboard one of His Majesty's Ships or establishments, even when not in a command appointment. The incumbent First Sea Lord flies the flag of an admiral, whilst the Second Sea Lord flies the flag appropriate to their rank.

Royal Navy distinguishing flags and broad pennants
Admiral of the fleet (Note: Admirals of the fleet; Former first sea lords; Admirals who are or have been chief of the defence staff)	Admiral (Note: Admirals; The First Sea Lord)	Vice admiral	Rear admiral	Commodore

General officers and brigadiers of the Royal Marines in a command appointment may fly a royal blue flag or pennant accorded to their rank when afloat in a small boat.

Royal Marines distinguishing flags and pennants
Commandant-general	General or lieutenant-general	Major-general	Brigadier

These officers of the Royal Navy and the Royal Marines may also fly a small car flag in a 2:3 ratio, sized 9 in × 6 in (230 mm × 150 mm), from the front of the bonnet of their car when on official duties and it is necessary for the car or its occupant to be recognised. The flag is not normally used on long journeys but may be hoisted when close to the destination. Officers below the rank of commodore and in command of a Royal Navy or Royal Marine training establishment may use the White Ensign as a car flag. Certain officers abroad, such as naval attachés, may also use the White Ensign as a car flag with the permission of the country's British ambassador or high commissioner.

=== Flag discs ===
The flag disc of a member of the Royal Family, displayed on the royal barge of HMY Britannia

Flag discs may be displayed when officers of flag rank and commodores do not wish to receive full ceremonial honours whilst travelling in a small boat. On formal occasions, a coloured disc with a white cross of St George may be used to receive the alert and salute only; a red disc is used by flag officers and commodores in command appointments instead of their distinguishing flag, whilst officers not in a command appointment, and therefore not entitled to hoist a distinguishing flag, display a blue disc. When embarked on naval aircraft, a blue disc may be displayed by entitled officers on formal occasions, but officers entitled to a red disc must instead use their distinguishing flag.

On informal occasions when these officers proceeding in a boat wish to receive a courtesy salute only, a white disc with five small black crosses is displayed. The Prince of Wales and other members of the Royal Family may display a royal badge instead of their personal standard in order to receive a courtesy salute only. The Sovereign does not display a flag disc and always flies the Royal Standard, receiving full ceremonial honours. Flag discs may not be displayed before colours, after sunset or on rigid-hull inflatable boats or inflatables.

Royal Navy flag discs
Alert and salute only		Courtesy salute only		
Flag officer or commodore in command	Officer of flag rank or commodore	Officer of flag rank or commodore	Prince of Wales	Member of the Royal Family

=== Star plates ===
Motor cars carrying officers of flag rank and commodores (and their equivalents in the Royal Marines, British Army and Royal Air Force) on official duties may bear a star plate, with the number of stars reflecting the rank of the officer. The plates must be covered when the officer is not in the vehicle. The colour of the star plate is royal blue for officers of the Royal Navy and red for officers of the Royal Marines, although officers in joint service appointments use a star plate in the joint service colours, which consists of three vertical bands of royal blue, red and air force blue.

Royal Navy star plates
Admiral of the fleet	Admiral	Vice admiral	Rear admiral	Commodore

Royal Marines star plates
General	Lieutenant-general	Major-general	Brigadier

== History ==
=== 18th and first half of the 19th century ===
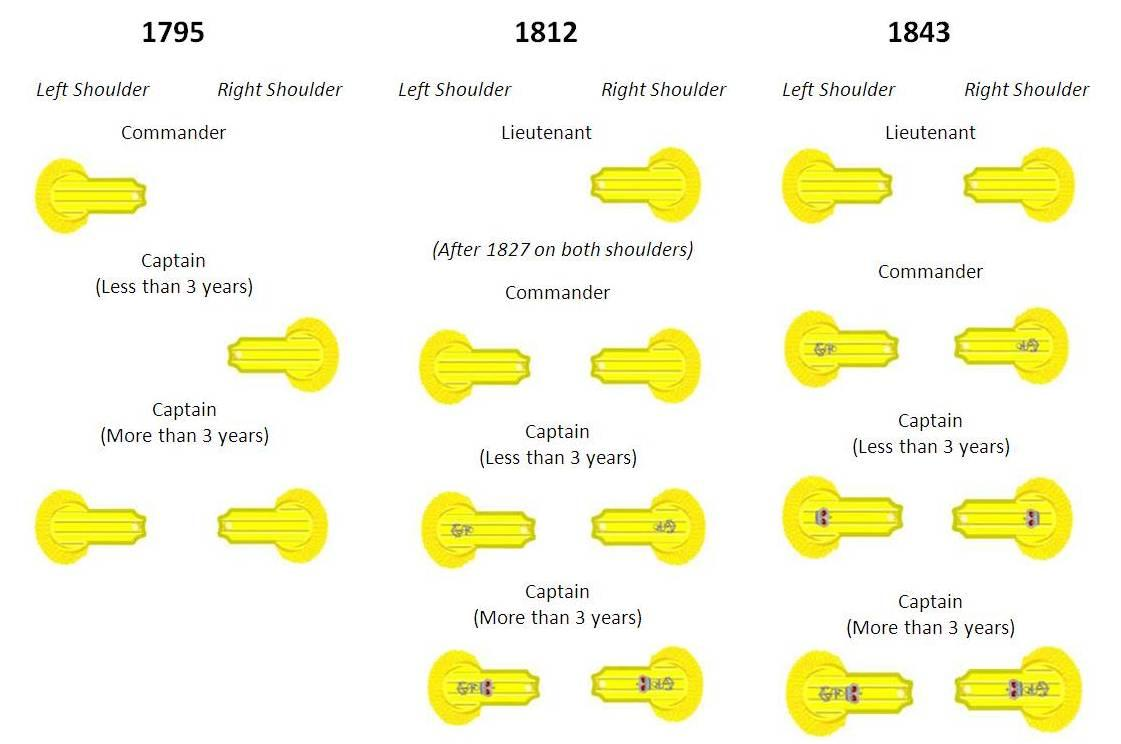
Royal Navy epaulettes for senior and junior officers, 18th and 19th centuries

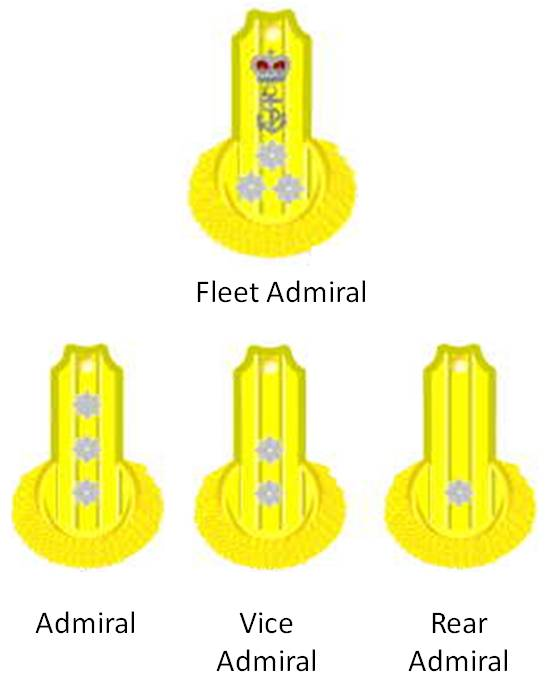
Royal Navy epaulettes for flag officers, 18th and 19th centuries

Uniforms for naval officers were not authorised until 1748. At first the cut and style of the uniform differed considerably between ranks, and specific rank insignia were only sporadically used. By the 1790s, the Royal Navy's first established uniform regulations had been published.

Ranks could be indicated by embroidery on the cuffs, by arrangement of buttons or, after 1795, on epaulettes. See the link under title for this section.

Midshipmen received a white patch on the collar in 1758, the oldest badge still in use today.

=== Cuff stripes ===
As the Royal Navy's ships became more and more based on steam power, and the grease and work necessary to maintain those systems, expensive gold bullion epaulets that dirtied easily became more and more impractical for daily duty. The modern system of gold rings on the cuffs originated on 11 April 1856. It had its antecedents in the previous uniforms of the 18th and 19th century, esp. those of 1827–1842. For the first time these were applied to all blue uniforms. Also, for the first time, the executive curl made its definitive appearance in the regulations.

Admiral of the fleet	1 3/4in below four 5/8in
Admiral	1 3/4in below three 5/8in
Vice admiral	1 3/4in below two 5/8in
Rear admiral and Commodore 1st class	1 3/4 in below one 5/8in
Commodore 2nd class	four 5/8in
Captain	three 1/2in
Commander	two 1/2in
Lieutenant	one 1/2in
Mate	one 1/4in braid

On 16 April 1861, mates were commissioned as sub-lieutenants and lieutenants were divided into those of over eight years seniority and those under. As a result, on 5 September 1861 the lower ranks' rings were changed:

Commodore 2nd class	1 3/4in
Captain	four 1/2in
Commander	three 1/2in
Lieutenant, over 8 years	two 1/2in
Lieutenant, under 8 years	one 1/2in

and on 25 March 1863 to:

Commodore 2nd class	1 3/4in
Captain	four 1/2in
Commander	three 1/2in
Lieutenant	two 1/2in
Sub-lieutenant	one 1/2in

On 30 October 1877, a lieutenant of eight years'/ seniority got an additional half-ring of 3/16in, increased to 1/4in in 1891, and in 1914 became the new rank of lieutenant commander.

In 1919, the admiral's narrow stripe was reduced to 1/2in, but as King George V had not approved the change, the Royal Family continued to wear the wider ring.

In 1931, all the 1/2in rings were all increased to 9/16in.

The curl was introduced in 1856, but initially only the military (or executive) and navigating (masters) branches wore it.

Other (civil) branches had plain rings, from 1863 with coloured distinction cloth between or below them. Until 1891 officers of the 'civil' branches had single-breasted coats with different arrangements of buttons.

Branch	Distinction cloth (1863–1955)	Buttons (1832–1891)
Masters (until 1867)	Light blue	9 evenly spaced
Masters (after 1867)	None	3 groups of 3 (on double breasted coat)
Surgeons	Red	3 groups of 3
Pursers/accounting	White	4 groups of 2
Engineering (from 1853)	Purple	2 groups of 4
Instructors (from 1879) & schoolmasters (from 1917)	Light blue	9 evenly spaced
Shipwrights (from 1918)	Silver grey	
Wardmaster (medical assistants) (from 1918)	Maroon till 1951, then salmon-pink	
Electrical (from 1918)	Dark green	
Ordnance (1918–1950)	Dark blue	
Dentists (from 1924)	Orange	

Engineer officers received the curl in 1915 and all other officers in 1918. At the same time they also received other things such as oak leaves on the peaked cap that had formerly been the prerogative of the military branch.

Officers of the Royal Navy's Instructor Branch were distinguished by light-blue cloth worn between their gold sleeve-rank stripes. When the executive curl was extended to all officer branches in 1918, an Instructor Lieutenant (abbreviated Instr. Lt.) wore the ordinary lieutenant pattern of two gold stripes, with the upper stripe forming a curl, but with light-blue distinction cloth visible between the stripes. The light-blue branch colour was abolished with most other non-executive distinction colours in 1955, although the Instructor Branch rank titles remained in use afterwards; official notices continued to record instructor lieutenants and instructor lieutenant commanders during the 1970s.

In 1955 it was announced that the distinction cloth worn between the stripes of officers of the non-executive branches of the Royal Navy was to be abolished, except for those who must be clearly recognisable as non-combatant under the Geneva Convention.

Lieutenant Commander Surgeon with scarlet medical distinction cloth

The residual use of distinction cloth for non-combatants is therefore:

- Scarlet – medical
- Orange – dental
- Salmon pink – wardmasters (to 1993)
- Silver grey - civilian officers from Royal Corps of Naval Constructors (RCNC)
- Dark green – civilian officers when required to wear uniform (Note: The requirement for civilian officers to wear uniform – refer BRd 81 – normally arises when deployed overseas, including periods of duty exceeding 24 hours when embarked on a UK or allied vessel operating outside UK territorial waters.)

From 1955 to 1993 there was a rank of acting sub-lieutenant, with the same rank insignia as a sub-lieutenant.

Naval pilots in the Fleet Air Arm (and earlier the Royal Naval Air Service) have wings above the curl on the left hand sleeve. Other Fleet Air Arm officers had a letter 'A' inside the curl.

Rank group	Flag officers					Senior officers				Junior officers			Trainee
1856–1861
1856–1861	Admiral of the Fleet	Admiral	Vice admiral	Rear admiral	Commodore 1st class	Commodore 2nd class	Captain	Commander		Lieutenant	Mate	Midshipman	Officer cadet
1861–1863
1861–1863	Admiral of the Fleet	Admiral	Vice admiral	Rear admiral	Commodore 1st class	Commodore 2nd class	Captain	Commander	Lieutenant, over 8 years	Lieutenant, under 8 years	Sub-lieutenant	Midshipman	Officer cadet
1863–1877
1863–1877	Admiral of the Fleet	Admiral	Vice admiral	Rear admiral	Commodore 1st class	Commodore 2nd class	Captain	Commander	Lieutenant, over 8 years	Lieutenant, under 8 years	Sub-lieutenant	Midshipman	Officer cadet
1877–1891
1877–1891	Admiral of the Fleet	Admiral	Vice admiral	Rear admiral	Commodore 1st class	Commodore 2nd class	Captain	Commander	Lieutenant, over 8 years	Lieutenant, under 8 years	Sub-lieutenant	Midshipman	Officer cadet
1891–1914
1891–1914	Admiral of the Fleet	Admiral	Vice admiral	Rear admiral	Commodore 1st class	Commodore 2nd class	Captain	Commander	Lieutenant, over 8 years (Note: Middle stripe increased from 3/16in to 1/4in)	Lieutenant, under 8 years	Sub-lieutenant	Midshipman	Officer cadet
1914–interwar period
1914–interwar period	Admiral of the Fleet	Admiral	Vice admiral	Rear admiral	Commodore 1st class	Commodore 2nd class	Captain	Commander	Lieutenant Commander	Lieutenant	Sub-lieutenant	Midshipman	Officer cadet
interwar period/1939–present
interwar period/1939–present	Admiral of the Fleet	Admiral	Vice admiral	Rear admiral		Commodore	Captain	Commander	Lieutenant Commander	Lieutenant	Sub-lieutenant	Midshipman	Officer cadet
Rank group	Flag officers					Senior officers				Junior officers			Trainee

=== Rank badges ===
From 1795 rank badges could also be shown on epaulettes. The system changed several times, but after 1864 was as follows:

Admiral of the fleet	Crown, crossed batons, and four stars
Admiral	Crown, crossed baton & sword, and three stars
Vice admiral	Crown, crossed baton & sword, and two stars
Rear admiral	Crown, crossed baton & sword, and one (larger) star
Commodore & captain over three years	Crown, two stars, and foul anchor
Captain under 3 years	Crown, one star, and foul anchor
Commander	Crown and foul anchor
Lieutenant over eight years after 1914 Lieutenant commander	Star and foul anchor
Lieutenant under 8 years	Foul anchor

Rank group	Flag officers				Senior officers				Junior officers			Trainee
1864–1891 epaulettes reserved for dress uniforms after 1939 only in royal attendance by admirals												None
1864–1891 epaulettes reserved for dress uniforms after 1939 only in royal attendance by admirals	Admiral of the Fleet	Admiral	Vice admiral	Rear admiral	Commodore	Captain (over 3 yrs seniority)	Captain (under 3 yrs seniority)	Commander	Lieutenant (over 8 yrs seniority)	Lieutenant (less than 8 yrs seniority)	Sub-lieutenant (was Mate)	Midshipman
1891–1926 Shoulder Boards												Mate/Midshipman
1891–1926 Shoulder Boards	Admiral of the Fleet	Admiral	Vice admiral	Rear admiral	Commodore 1st Class	Commodore (2nd Class)	Captain	Commander	Lieutenant (over 8 yrs seniority) in 1914 became Lt. commander	Lieutenant (less than 8 yrs seniority)	Sub-lieutenant	Midshipman

- Sub-lieutenants and commissioned warrant officers wore scales (epaulettes without fringes, officially termed "shoulder straps") and the same device as a lieutenant.
- Epaulettes of the military branch were gold throughout with silver devices, while those of the civil branches had a silver edging and gold devices. Instead of the baton and sword or foul anchor, civil branch epaulettes substituted a star. Navigating branch epaulettes were the same as the military branch, but with crossed plain anchors in place of the foul anchor. The epaulette stars had eight points, quite unlike the Order of the Bath stars worn by army officers. (Note: Order of the Bath stars worn by army officers have four points and are sometimes referred to as "pips".)
- In 1891 the admiral of the fleet changed to a crown above two crossed batons within a wreath, similar to the badge of a field marshal.
- Also in 1891 shoulder-straps were introduced for use on white uniforms and on the greatcoat, and more recently in "shirt sleeve order". For these commodores first class and above used the same badge as on their epaulettes, and commodores second class and below used their rank rings.
- From 1926 only commodores had two stars, other captains one.
- Epaulettes were not worn after 1939 except by the royal family and in attendance on the royal family on ceremonial occasions by admirals.

In 2001, (Note: Refer UK Defence Council Instruction (Joint Service) (DCI(JS)) 125/2001) the shoulder boards on dress uniforms were changed to match the NATO system of stars for Flag Officers and are currently:

Admiral of the fleet	Crown, 2 crossed batons within a wreath
Admiral	Crown, crossed baton & sword and 4 stars
Vice admiral	Crown, crossed baton & sword and 3 stars
Rear admiral	Crown, crossed baton & sword and 2 stars
Commodore	Crown, crossed baton & sword and 1 star
Captain	Crown, one star, and foul anchor
Commander	Crown and foul anchor

=== Warrant officers ===
An example of a Royal Navy officer of the lieutenant rank – Lieutenant Carre Tupper, 1814

Warrant officers first received their uniforms in 1787. The navigators, surgeons and pursers were commissioned in 1843 and their insignia are described above.

In 1865 chief (later commissioned) gunners, boatswains, and carpenters were given a single 1/2in ring, with the curl, though the carpenters lost the curl in 1879.

In 1891 ordinary warrant officers of 10 years' standing were given a half-ring of 1/4in, with or without curl as above.

In 1918 this ring, with the curl, was extended to all non-commissioned warrant officers.

In 1949 WOs and CWOs became "commissioned branch officers" and "senior commissioned branch officers" and were admitted to the wardroom, but their insignia remained the same.

In 1956 they were integrated into the line officers as sub-lieutenants and lieutenants, and class distinctions finally disappeared from the uniform.

=== Reserves ===
From 1863 officers were commissioned in the Royal Naval Reserve this was for serving merchant navy officers only. They had rings each formed from two 1/4 inch wavy lines intersecting each other. The curl was formed into a six-pointed star. The lieutenant commander's half-ring was straight, but only 1/8 inch wide. The commodore had a broad straight ring, but the same star for a curl. Midshipmen had a blue collar patch.

Officers of the Royal Naval Volunteer Reserve (formed 1903) for civilians, had single wavy rings 1/4 inch wide, with the curl a squarish shape. The lieutenant commander's narrow ring was originally straight, but after 1942 was waved also. This system of rank insignia is still worn today by officers in the Volunteer Cadet Corps and Sea Cadets. Midshipmen in the RNVR had a maroon collar patch.

In 1951 both reserves lost their distinctive insignia and got normal straight stripes like the regulars, but with a letter 'R' inside the curl. The two organisations were merged in 1958. In 2007 officers of the Royal Naval Reserve had the 'R' distinction from badges of rank removed. Temporary officers in the RNR however continue to wear the 'R' inside the curl, honorary officers wear the regular insignia with no distinction.

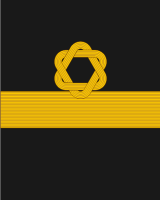
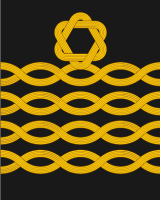
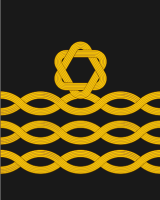
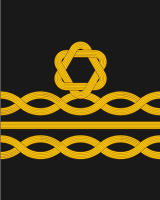
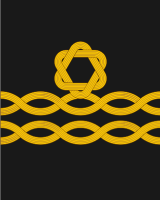
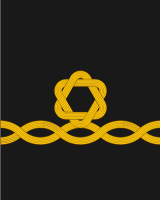
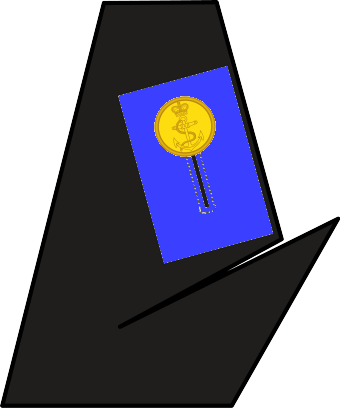
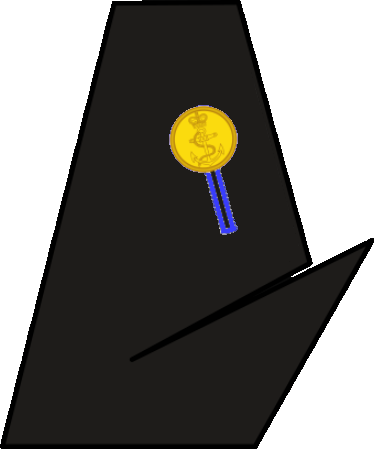
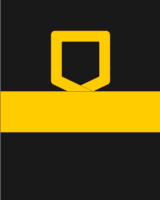
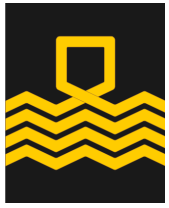
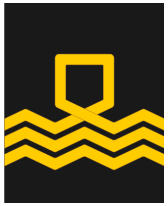
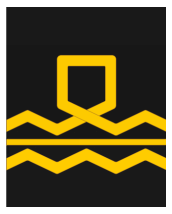
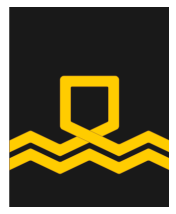
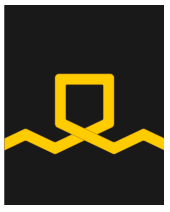
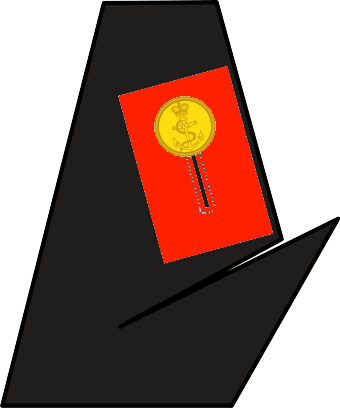
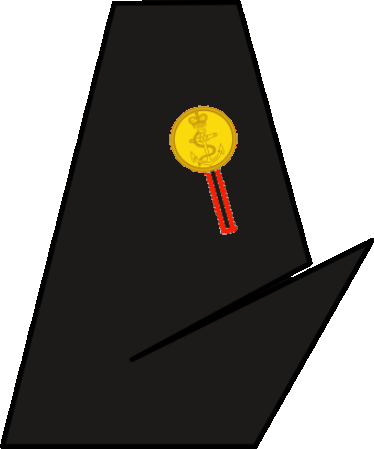
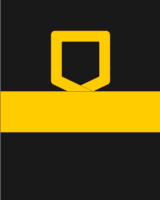
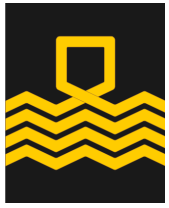
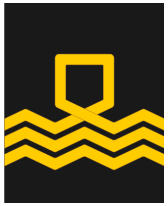
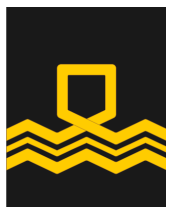
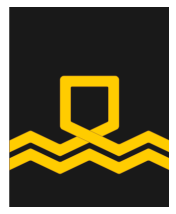
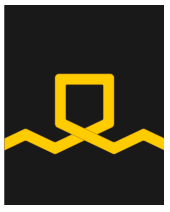
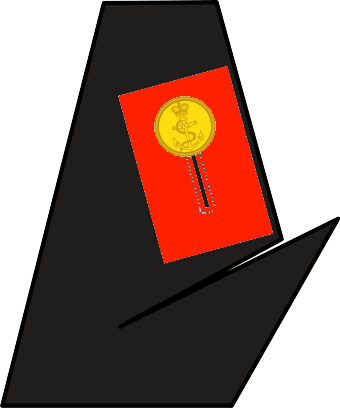
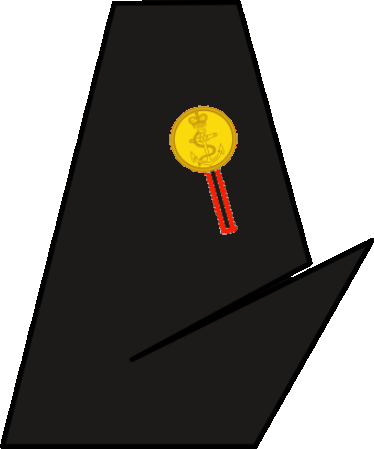
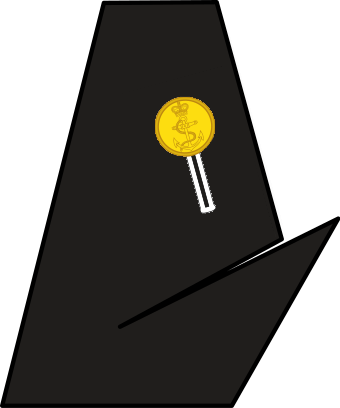
Rank group	General / flag officers					Senior officers			Junior officers
Royal Naval Reserve (1916–1951)
Royal Naval Reserve (1916–1951)					Commodore	Captain	Commander	Lieutenant commander	Lieutenant	Sub lieutenant	Midshipman	Naval Cadet
Royal Naval Volunteer Reserve (1916–1941)
Royal Naval Volunteer Reserve (1916–1941)					Commodore	Captain	Commander	Lieutenant commander	Lieutenant	Sub lieutenant	Midshipman	Naval Cadet
Royal Naval Volunteer Reserve (1942–1951)
Royal Naval Volunteer Reserve (1942–1951)					Commodore	Captain	Commander	Lieutenant commander	Lieutenant	Sub lieutenant	Midshipman	Naval Cadet
Royal Naval Reserve (1952–2006)
Royal Naval Reserve (1952–2006)					Commodore	Captain	Commander	Lieutenant commander	Lieutenant	Sub lieutenant	Midshipman	Naval Cadet
NATO code	OF-10	OF-9	OF-8	OF-7	OF-6	OF-5	OF-4	OF-3	OF-2	OF-1

=== Wrens ===
Officers in the Women's Royal Naval Service had straight rings in light blue, with a diamond shape instead of the curl. The Women's Royal Naval Service was abolished in 1994 and female officers now have the same gold rings as male officers.

== See also ==
- British Army officer rank insignia
- RAF officer ranks
- Ranks of the cadet forces of the United Kingdom
- Royal Marines Band Service
- Royal Navy other rank insignia
