= Executive curl =

Ring above a naval officer's gold lace or braid insignia

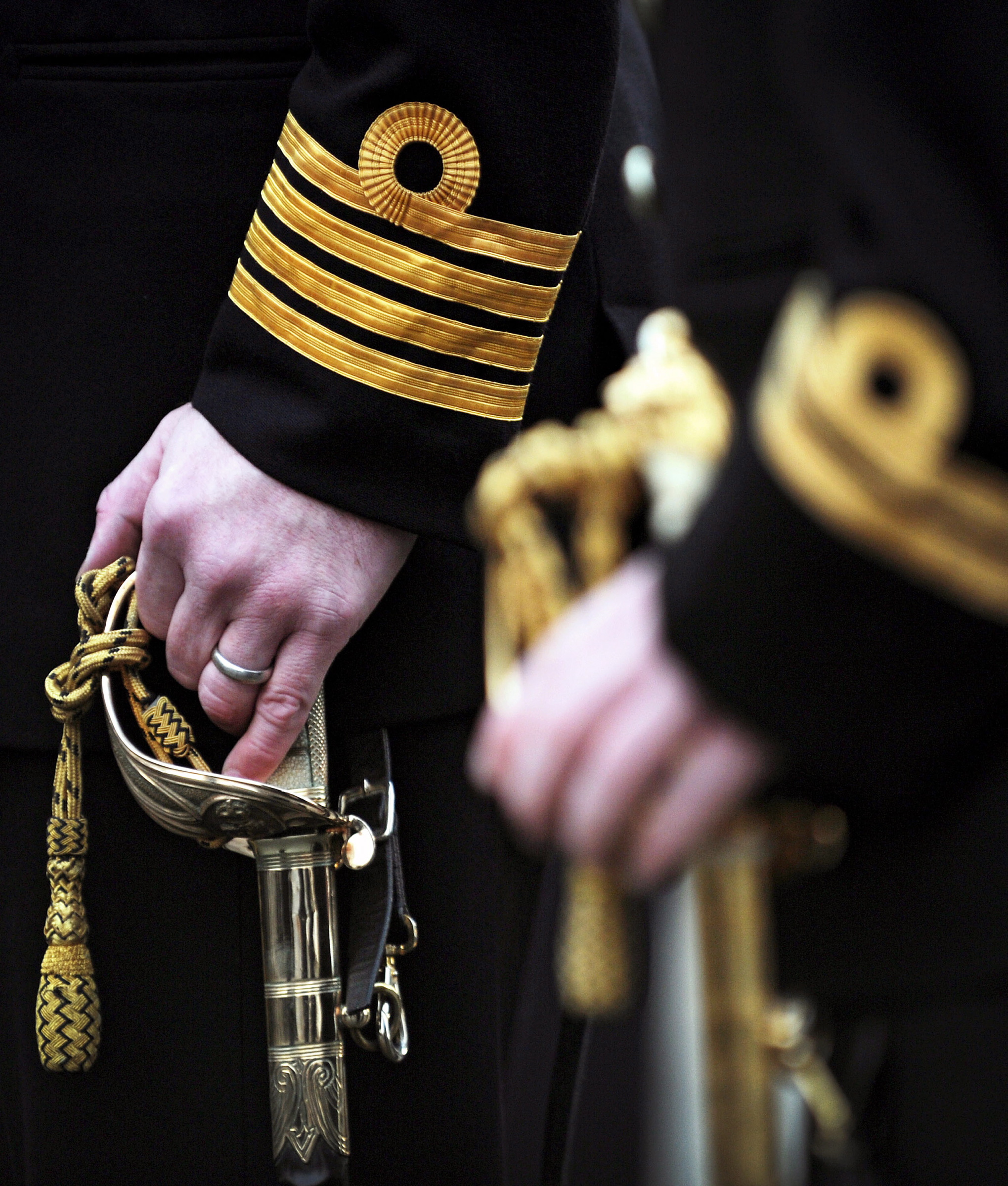
Executive curl on a Royal Navy Captain.

The executive curl, or the "Elliot's Eye", is the ring above a naval officer's gold lace or braid insignia. It originated with the Royal Navy.

== Origins ==
The executive curl was introduced shortly after the end of the Crimean War, by Admiralty circular No. 246, of April 11, 1856 (without mentioning the term "Elliot's eye"). It may perhaps best be explained as the simplest-possible form of the various loops, trefoils, Austrian knots and Hungarian knots that were popular embellishments on Service uniforms at the time.

Later, various legends arose surrounding the origin of the executive curl's nickname "Elliot's eye". Most probably a kind of sailor's yarn is a story in memory of Royal Navy Captain George Elliot: When wounded in the arm during the Crimean War, he supposedly used the gold lace of his dress uniform as a sling. Another tale says the Elliot's eye's invention is owed to the Honourable William Elliot, a civil commissioner of the Admiralty from 1800 to 1804, who – according to legend – was himself inspired by the method of making an eye in a ship's rope or hemp cable (an eye splice as a sort of nautical/boating/sailor's knot). As designation of an eye splice, "Admiral Elliott's Eye" (written here with a double t) was already known in 1856, and perhaps it soon also became the executive curl's alias name.

== Usage history ==
Lord Anson's Board of Admiralty issued the first uniform regulations in 1748 to set a distinction between naval and other officers and lay down precise rules of rank and precedence among naval officers. Distinctive lace on the sleeves of flag officers was introduced in 1783 and was extended to other officers in 1856 with the addition of the curl in the uppermost row of lace for officers of the executive branch only. From 1879 to 1891, Royal Navy officers wore three brass buttons between the lace. In January 1915, the use of the curl was extended to engineer officers and to other officers in 1918. The naval pattern lace was different in that it followed a straight line with a round loop while British Army uniforms were decorated on the sleeve with a loop that rose to a peak in the form of a “crow’s foot” or “Austrian knot”.

When the Royal Naval Reserve was formed in 1859, its officers were differentiated from regular officers with rank braid that was half the width and formed two waved lines, one superimposed upon the other with a six-pointed star in place of the curl.

In 1903, the Royal Naval Volunteer Reserve was instituted and the officers were distinguished with waved stripes worn parallel to each other, surmounted by a squared waved “curl”.

Officers of the Women's Royal Naval Service wore sky-blue lace with a diamond-shaped loop. The Royal Fleet Auxiliary also employs a diamond in lieu of the curl.

Although in the Royal Navy the curl is now common to all officers (less those of its associated cadet forces), some other navies who copied the custom have restricted its use to their deck officers. While some navies placed insignia above the braid to indicate specialist branches, Commonwealth navies used coloured cloth beneath the gold lace. Coloured branch distinction, first introduced in 1863, went out of use except for the medical, nursing, medical administration and technical branches, on 31 December 1959.

Although 19 of 22 Commonwealth of Nations navies use the executive curl, according to Jane's Fighting Ships, 55 of the world's navies use the insignia on officer's uniform in their naval forces; Argentina, Australia, Bahamas, Bangladesh, Barbados, Belgium, Brazil, Brunei, Canada, Colombia, Congo (DRC), Cyprus, Denmark, Estonia, Fiji, Gabon, Ghana, Greece, Iceland, India, Iran, Italy, Jamaica, Kenya, Latvia, Lithuania, Malaysia, Mauritania, Mexico, Myanmar, Morocco, Mozambique, Netherlands, New Zealand, Nigeria, Norway, Pakistan, Papua New Guinea, Panama, Poland, Portugal, Qatar, Romania, Slovenia, South Africa, Spain (except during the 1931-1939 Spanish Republic), Sri Lanka, Sweden, Thailand, Tonga, Trinidad and Tobago, Tunisia, Turkey, United Kingdom, Uruguay, Venezuela and Vietnam.

The navies that do not use the curl may replace it with a star, as in the cases of the Chilean Navy, the German Navy, the Irish Naval Service, the Russian Navy, the United States Navy, and winter uniforms of the Chinese Navy and the Indonesian Navy; or with other devices, as in the cases of the Finnish Navy, the Japan Maritime Self-Defense Force, the Republic of Korea Navy and shoulder boards of the French Navy.

== Royal Canadian Navy ==
Prior to 1910, the Royal Navy provided maritime defence of British North America and for the Dominion of Canada from 1867. In the early 20th century, Britain redistributed the British fleet and reduced its stations in Halifax and Esquimalt. As a result, the government of Canada on May 4, 1910, under the authority of the Naval Services Act, created the Naval Service of Canada. On August 29, 1911, it was designated the Royal Canadian Navy by King George V, and remained as such until 1968, when Canada's navy became Maritime Command within the Canadian Armed Forces.

When it was created in 1910, it was natural for the emerging Canadian Navy to adopt the same unwavering rings with the executive curl for the permanent navy and subsequently the “wavy” shaped rings for the Royal Canadian Naval Volunteer Reserve (RCNVR) and the rings of narrow interwoven gold lace for the Royal Canadian Navy Reserve. Sea Cadet Corps officers had a small anchor in place of the executive curl.

Following World War II, the Royal Canadian Navy was reorganized with a single reserve component. In 1946, the distinctive wavy gold braid of the reserves gave way to the straight braided executive curl of the regular force until 1968. With the integration of the Canadian Armed Forces, unembellished straight braid became the common rank insignia for all officers of both the regular and reserve forces. The executive curl rank insignia was reserved for navy mess dress from 1968 to 2010 and used historical, rather than standard, rank structures, having both acting sub-lieutenants and sub-lieutenants wear one single bar of rank on the sleeve with the executive curl.

On March 5, 2010, the House of Commons unanimously passed a private members' motion recommending, "That the government should consider reinstating the navy executive curl on its uniforms." Guy Lauzon, member of Parliament for Stormont-Dundas-South Glengarry, explained that the insignia is common to most nations that have a monarch as a head of state. Subsequently, in recognition of the Canadian Naval Centennial, The Honourable Peter MacKay, Minister of National Defence, authorized the use of the executive curl for the Canadian Navy on Battle of Atlantic Sunday, May 2, 2010. After 42 years absence, the executive curl insignia became effective again for service dress uniforms on June 11, 2010, on the occasion of the Pacific Canadian Naval Centennial International Fleet Review parade of nations in Victoria, British Columbia.
