= Lieutenant commander (Royal Navy) =

Senior officer rank of the Royal Navy

Lieutenant Commander
- Shoulder board and sleeve lace
- Country: United Kingdom
- Service branch: Royal Navy
- Abbreviation: Lt Cdr
- Rank group: Senior officers
- NATO rank code: OF-3
- Next higher rank: Commander
- Next lower rank: Lieutenant
- Equivalent ranks: Major (RM/British Army); Squadron leader (RAF)

Lieutenant Commander (often abbreviated Lt Cdr), formerly more commonly Lieutenant-Commander, is a senior officer rank in the Royal Navy of the United Kingdom. It is immediately junior to Commander and immediately senior to the naval rank of Lieutenant.

The equivalent rank in the British Army and Royal Marines is Major; and in the Royal Air Force, it is Squadron Leader.

In keeping with all other double-barrelled officer ranks in the UK Armed Forces, Lieutenant Commander is abbreviated to its higher component in shorthand. Thus, Lieutenant Commander John Smith of the Royal Navy should be referred to as "Commander Smith" and addressed as either "Commander Smith" or, simply, "Commander". The full rank of "Lieutenant Commander" should only be used when the officer's full name ("Lieutenant Commander John Smith Royal Navy") is used.

== History ==
Originally having fewer officer ranks than the Army, the Navy previously split some of its ranks by seniority (time in rank) to provide equivalence: hence a Lieutenant with fewer than eight years' seniority wore two stripes and ranked with an army Captain; a lieutenant of eight years or more wore two stripes with a thinner one in between, and ranked with a Major. This distinction was abolished when the rank of Lieutenant-Commander was introduced in April 1914, although promotion to that rank remained automatic following eight years' seniority in the rank of Lieutenant. Automatic promotion was stopped in 2000, with the introduction of Pay2000 – The Armed Forces Pay Model, with promotion thereafter awarded only on merit.

== Insignia ==
The insignia worn by a Royal Navy Lieutenant Commander is two half-inch gold braid stripes with one quarter-inch gold stripe running in between, placed upon a navy blue background. The top stripe has the ubiquitous loop used in all RN officer rank insignia, except for the rank of Midshipman. The RAF follows this pattern with its equivalent rank of Squadron Leader.

== Royal Observer Corps ==
Throughout much of its existence, the British Royal Observer Corps (ROC) maintained a rank of observer Lieutenant-Commander. The ROC wore a Royal Air Force uniform and their rank insignia appeared similar to that of an RAF squadron leader except that the stripes were shown entirely in black. Prior to the renaming, the rank had been known as observer lieutenant (first class).

== See also ==
- British and U.S. military ranks compared
- Comparative military ranks
- Royal Navy officer rank insignia
