= Ranks and insignia of the officers of the British Army =

Listed in the table below are the rank insignia of the British Army. Badges for field officers were introduced in 1810 and the insignia was moved to the epaulettes in 1880. On ceremonial or parade uniforms these ranks continue to be worn on the epaulettes, either as cloth slides or as metal clips, although on the modern 'working dress' (daily uniform) they are usually worn as a cloth slide on the chest. Although these insignia apply across the British Army there is variation in the precise design and colours used and it can take some time to become familiar with them all.

Officers in the ranks of lieutenant and second lieutenant are often referred to as subalterns and these and captains are also referred to as company officers. Brigadiers, colonels, lieutenant colonels and majors are field officers. All above these are considered to be of general officer rank.

== Insignia ==
=== Badges of rank ===
Rank insignia of the commissioned officers of the British Army
Rank group	Field marshals	General officers			Field officers				Junior officers			Officer cadets
NATO code	OF-10	OF-9	OF-8	OF-7	OF-6	OF-5	OF-4	OF-3	OF-2	OF-1		N/A
Insignia												
Rank	Field marshal	General	Lieutenant-general	Major-general	Brigadier	Colonel	Lieutenant colonel	Major	Captain	Lieutenant	Second lieutenant	Officer cadet
Abbreviation	FM	Gen	Lt Gen	Maj Gen	Brig	Col	Lt Col	Maj	Capt	Lt	2Lt	OCdt

The standard star design (colloquially known as a 'pip') is the Bath star, based on the star of a Knight Grand Cross Military Division of the Order of the Bath but with two of the star's three small crowns uppermost and without the motto of the Prince of Wales, Ich dien, underneath. Officers of the Princess of Wales's Royal Regiment and the Royal Welsh wear a slightly different design known as the Eversleigh star which includes the motto. Officers of the Household Division and the Honourable Artillery Company wear stars based on those of the orders of the Garter, the Thistle and St Patrick. Buttons shown for ranks below colonel vary by regiment.

The Mameluke sword on the insignia of a general officer points to the officer's front when worn on the shoulders and to the officer's right shoulder (to the viewer's left, as shown) when worn as a front rank slide. Field marshals wear two crossed batons, with the baton that points to the officer's front beneath the baton which points to the officer's rear.

=== Transport insignia ===
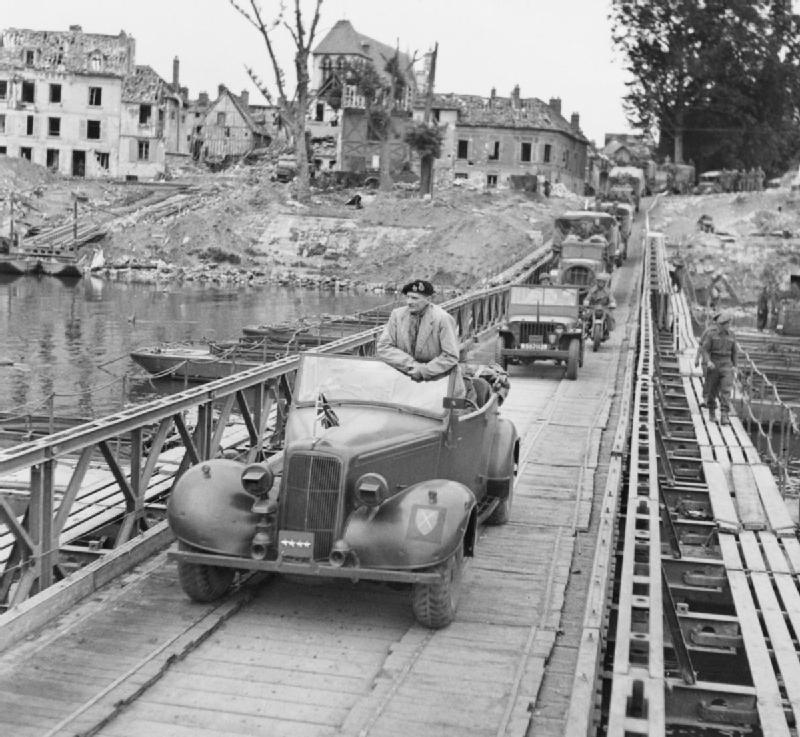
Bernard Montgomery in a staff car in 1944, displaying the star plate of a general and the car flag of an army group commander, the Union Flag, as GOC-in-C, 21st Army Group.

==== Star plates ====
Motor cars carrying field marshals, general officers and brigadiers (and their equivalents in the Royal Navy, Royal Marines and Royal Air Force) on official duties may bear a star plate, with the number of stars reflecting the rank of the officer. The plates must be covered when the officer is not in the vehicle. The colour of the star plate is red for officers of the British Army and Royal Marines, although officers in joint service appointments use a star plate in the joint service colours, which consists of three vertical bands of royal blue, red and air force blue. Star plates may also be displayed on Army aircraft.

British Army star plates
Field Marshal	General	Lieutenant-general	Major-general	Brigadier

==== Car flags ====
In the British Army, only field marshals have an assigned rank flag, which is the Union Flag. However, general officers commanding and brigadiers in command of a formation may fly a designated car flag or pennant from the front of the bonnet of their car when on official duties and it is necessary for the car or its occupant to be recognised. British Army car flags are in a 2:3 ratio and are sized 9 in × 6 in (230 mm × 150 mm), with the exception of Army Board car flags which are 9 in × 9 in (230 mm × 230 mm). The flag is not normally used on long journeys but may be hoisted when close to the destination. They may not be flown on army aircraft, but the chief of the general staff may fly their flag of appointment when a passenger in a transport aircraft of the Royal Navy or the Royal Air Force. Master generals, honorary colonels, colonels commandant and their deputies, corps and regimental colonels may use their corps or regimental pennant as a car flag, and the Master Gunner, St James's Park, uses a miniature of the Royal Artillery Standard. In foreign and Commonwealth countries, officers must seek the permission of its British ambassador or high commissioner in order to use a car flag.

British Army car flags and pennants
Chief of the general staff	Military member of the Army Board	Commander Land Forces (C-in-C) or army group commander (GOC-in-C)	Senior staff officer on the staff of a C-in-C (Note: Not below the rank of major general and at the headquarters of a 3 or 4 star commander, at the discretion of the C-in-C.)
Army commander (GOC-in-C or GOC) (Note: Or a lieutenant general commanding a formation in the UK.)	Corps commander (GOC)	Divisional commander (GOC) (Note: A major general)	District commander (GOC) (Note: GOC London District, Support Command, and the former appointment of GOC Scotland)
Area or sub-district commander (Note: Or the deputy commander of a division)	Brigade commander	British military attaché	Master Gunner, St James's Park (Note: On official Royal Artillery occasions)
For appointments below army group commander, the car flags are defaced by the approved formation emblem in the centre of the flag. (Note: Brigade commanders of the Royal Artillery and Royal Engineers have the formation sign in the upper corner of the flag next to the hoist and a gun (muzzle towards the hoist) or grenade, respectively, in the centre of the flag.)

==== Flags afloat ====
When on board a vessel, general officers commanding fly a distinguishing flag at the fore consisting of a Union Flag defaced by the royal cypher within a blue disc circled by a gold coloured rim and a green garland. When on joint operations at sea with the other armed services, it may be hoisted at the fore to denote the presence of an army headquarters, but it does not replace any flag officer's flag, broad pennant or masthead pennant, which must be flown in a superior position.

General officer commanding
afloat

== Role ==
Officer rank	Typical command size	Typical command appointment	Typical time taken for a promotion
Field marshal	Army group	Chief of the Defence Staff (CDS); Chief of the General Staff (CGS); Army group commander (GOC-in-C)	N/A
General	Army group	Chief of the Defence Staff (CDS); Chief of the General Staff (CGS); Army group commander (GOC-in-C)	N/A
Lieutenant-general	Army or corps	Army commander (GOC-in-C or GOC); Corps commander (GOC)	N/A
Major general	Division	Division commander (GOC)	N/A
Brigadier	Brigade	Brigade commander or senior appointment on the Army staff	N/A
Colonel	Field command in the Royal Army Medical Corps	Staff officers	N/A
Lieutenant colonel	Up to 650 soldiers and officers	Regiment/battalion/battlegroup (commanding officer)	N/A
Major	Up to 120 soldiers and officers	Squadron/battery/company (officer commanding)	After being in the army for between 8 and 10 years
Captain	Between 50 and 120 soldiers	Squadron/battery/company (2IC)	After 3 years of commissioned service
Lieutenant	35 soldiers	Troop/platoon commander	Up to 2 years after reaching second lieutenant rank
Second lieutenant	35 soldiers	Troop/platoon commander	After completing officer training
Officer cadet	No command		N/A

== History of rank insignia ==
=== General officers ===
Before 1767, there were no definite badges for Field Marshals and general officers. In 1767, the British Army issued an order to distinguish Field Marshals (once the rank was established in 1813) and different graded General officers by the combination of chevron-shaped ess pattern laces on the sleeve.

- Field Marshal: Evenly spaced six laces.
- General: Evenly spaced four laces.
- Lieutenant General: Six laces in threes.
- Major General: Four laces in twos.
- Brigadier General: Three laces. Upper twos were in pair.

During the Napoleonic Wars, field marshals wore oak-leaf embroidered collar and cuff; and shoulder cord instead of previous pattern. It was continued until the end of 1830.

At the beginning of 1831, new rank distinction was ordered for field marshals and general officers.

- Field Marshal: Cross baton and wreath designed device was on epaulettes and buttons were evenly spaced .
- General: Cross baton and sword with crown designed device on the epaulettes and buttons were evenly spaced.
- Lieutenant General: Cross baton and sword with crown designed device on the epaulettes and buttons were in threes.
- Major General: Cross baton and sword with crown designed device on the epaulettes and buttons were in twos.
- Brigadier General: No device on the epaulettes and buttons were in two.

After the Crimean War (30 January 1855), the War Office ordered different rank badges for British general, staff officers and regimental officers. It was the first complete set of rank badges to be used by the British Army.

- Field Marshal: Two rows of one inch wide oak-leaf designed lace on the collar with crossed baton above the wreath in silver.
- General: Two rows of one inch wide oak-leaf designed lace on the collar with Crown and star in silver.
- Lieutenant General: Two rows of one inch wide oak-leaf designed lace on the collar with Crown in silver.
- Major General: Two rows of one inch wide oak-leaf designed lace on the collar with Star in silver.
- Brigadier-general: Two rows of half inch wide staff pattern lace on the collar with Crown and star in silver.

In 1868, brigadier-generals were ordered to wear the same collar as other General officers, but no device in the collar.

In 1880, the War Office ordered to move rank badges from collar to shoulder.

- Field Marshal: Crossed batons above the wreath of oak-leaf. On the top of the wreath a crown.
- General: Crossed baton and sword with Crown and star.
- Lieutenant General: Crossed baton and sword with Crown.
- Major General: Crossed baton and sword with Star.
- Brigadier General: Crossed baton and sword.

Due to the expansion of the Army during World War I, there were a very large number of general officers, whose numbers were very disproportionate to the other Allied Armies, and reduced the status of all British Generals. There were talks and proposal to address the number of general officers without abolishing the rank, but it was found that this would produce a number of issues and was considered impracticable. In 1920 it was promulgated in Army Order 545 of 1920 to abolish the rank of Brigadier General and substitute in its place the ranks Colonel Commandant (commander of a brigade or training school) and Colonel-on-the-Staff (staff officer, usually appointed Directors, Deputy Director etc. at the War Officer and in India), effective from 1 January 1921. The rank badges of Colonel Commandant and Colonel on the staff were identical to each other, consisting of a crown and three stars. After difficulties arose for those who previously held the rank of brigadier-general; Earl Curzon stated that: "…British Military Attaches at foreign capitals who at present hold the rank of Brigadier-General…will lose precedence and prestige and will have to yield in both respects to foreign officers…". The Secretary of State refused to make an exception for Military Attaches, on the advice of the Army Council. However, following this, difficulties arose in India, as in the minds of the Indian personnel commanders of brigades had lost prestige, as the term Colonel conveys the command of battalions. In 1926 Formal consent by the King to substitute Colonel Commandant with Brigadier was given, however after further issues were raised, the matter was reopened and on reconsideration it was decided to abolish the title of Colonel-on-the-Staff also. Accordingly, on 1 June 1928, the temporary rank of brigadier was reinstated, and the titles of Colonel Commandant and Colonel-on-the-Staff were abolished. The Army Order stated,

"Officers holding the temporary rank of brigadier will have precedence of, and command over all other colonels. Among them- selves they will take precedence according to their permanent rank. They will wear the same dress (including rank badges) as at present prescribed for colonels commandant and colonels on the staff."

Brigadiers have held the same rank insignia, of the Colonel Commandant and Colonels-on-the-Staff since 1928.

=== Regimental officers ===
In 1953, the crown was changed from the Tudor Crown to the Crown of St Edward, when Queen Elizabeth II adopted a stylised image of the crown for use in coats of arms, badges, logos and various other insignia. King Charles III reinstated the Tudor Crown in 2022 and it was rolled out onto British Army uniforms in time for his coronation in 2023.

Initially company and field rank insignia did not appear on officers' uniforms. In 1791 the War Office ordered officers to wear different graded epaulettes and wings to distinguish regimental officer ranks (Colonel to Ensign/ Cornet). This was ordered only for line infantry officers. According to the Army Order,

- Field officers (Colonel, Lieutenant-Colonel and Major) wore epaulettes on both shoulders.
- Company officers (Captain, Captain-Lieutenant, Lieutenant and Ensign / 2nd Lieutenant) of centre companies wore a single epaulette on right shoulder only.
- Grenadier and Light companies Captain and Subalterns wore wings on both shoulders.

In 1795, a special pattern of epaulettes was ordered for Fusiliers and Light Infantry officers. Field officers of those regiments wore epaulettes over wings. Company officers wore wings.

A specific system of rank insignia for field officers probably existed beginning from the 1790s. This is suggested by a General Order of the HEIC dated 21 July 1796: It was ordered that lieutenant colonels had to wear one six-pointed star in the centre of the strap of both epaulettes, while colonels had two stars on the epaulettes' strap (majors had no insiagnia). Presumably the HEIC followed one of the uniform regulations of the British Army, which it usually adopted very quickly after its publication.

In February 1810, an order was issued by the War Office to distinguish Field officer ranks. The following devices were introduced in the epaulettes:

- Colonel: Crown and Garter star
- Lieutenant Colonel: Crown
- Major: Garter star

These badges were issued for all infantry regiments except the Foot Guards. In 1815, badges for Foot Guards were ordered. In Foot Guards regiments, all Field Officers were equivalent to the Colonels of line infantry regiments. Captains were equivalent to Lieutenant Colonels, Lieutenants were equivalent to Majors and Ensigns were equivalent to Captains of Battalion companies.

- Field Officers: Crown and star (Grenadier Guards and Coldstream Guards used the Garter star, and Scots Fusilier Guards used the Thistle star).
- Captain: Crown
- Lieutenant: Star
- Ensign: No device. (Ensigns of the Grenadier Guards wore epaulettes on both shoulders, but the Ensigns of the other two regiments wore a single epaulette on the right shoulder.)

In 1829, epaulettes and wings were standardised by maintaining the badges of rank issued in 1810 and 1815. According to the order, epaulettes of all regular infantry regiments and foot guards regiments would be in gold and other regiments were in silver. All officers including field and company officers wore epaulettes and wings on both shoulders. The epaulettes over wings system was abolished. Different graded officer wore different sized bullion to distinguish themselves from other.

- Colonel: Epaulette bullions were three and half inches in length. Insignia was a Crown and a Bath star.
- Lieutenant Colonel: Epaulette bullions were three and half inches in length. Insignia was a Crown.
- Major: Epaulette bullions were three inches in length. Insignia was a Bath star.
- Captain of Battalion company: Epaulette bullion were two and half inches in length. No insignia device.
- Subaltern of Battalion company: Epaulette bullion were two inches in length. No insignia device.
- Captain of Flank companies: Wings bullions were one and quarter inches in length and half inches in wide.
- Subalterns of Flank companies: Wings bullions were one and quarter inches in length and quarter inches in wide.

In January 1855, at the end of the Crimean War, the War Office abolished all epaulette and wing rank badges. New rank badges were introduced in the collar. It was first time that a complete set of rank badges was used by the British Army.

- Colonel: Two rows of half inch laces in collar with Crown and Bath star.
- Lieutenant Colonel: Two rows of half inch laces in collar with Crown.
- Major: Two rows of half inch laces in collar with Bath star.
- Captain: One row of half inch lace on the top of collar with Crown and Bath star.
- Lieutenant: One row of half inch lace on the top of collar with Crown.
- Ensign/Sub Lieutenant: One row of half inch lace on the top of collar with Bath star.

In April 1880, rank badges were moved from collar to shoulder and officers of all regiments wore the following rank badges.

- Colonel: Crown and two Bath stars.
- Lieutenant Colonel: Crown and one Bath star
- Major: Crown
- Captain: Two Bath stars
- Lieutenant: One Bath star
- Second Lieutenant: No device

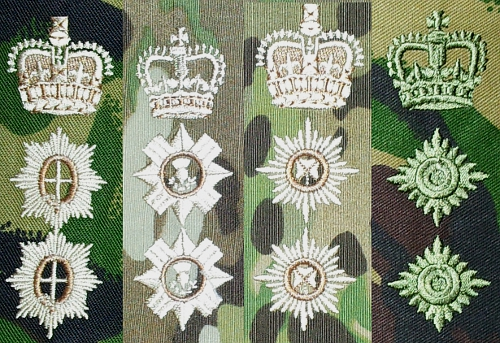
The rank insignia for officers are also differentiated by what specific stars are used. Left to right: Grenadier, Coldstream, and Welsh Guards (Garter); Scots Guards (Thistle); Irish Guards (Shamrock); other army officers (Bath).

In May 1902, rank badges were moved to sleeve's cuff and company-grade officer badges were slightly modified:

- Captain: Three Bath stars
- Lieutenant: Two Bath stars
- Second Lieutenant: One Bath star

In 1919, a new order was issued by the Horse Guards office—all Guards officers would wear special star badges.

- Grenadier Guards: Garter star
- Coldstream Guards: Garter star
- Scots Guards: Thistle star
- Irish Guards: Shamrock star
- Welsh Guards: Garter star

During World War I, some officers took to wearing tunics with the rank badges on the shoulder, as the cuff badges made them too conspicuous to snipers. This practice was frowned on outside the trenches but was given official sanction in 1917 as an optional alternative, being made permanent in 1920, when the cuff badges were abolished.

=== Historical insignia ===
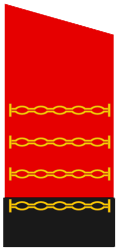
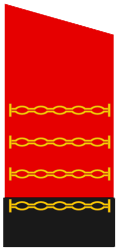
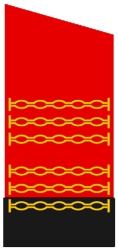
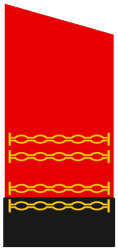
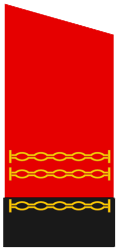
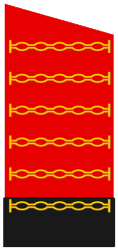
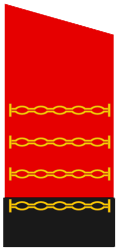
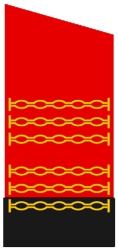
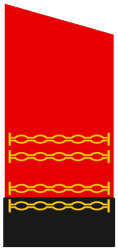
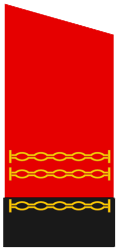
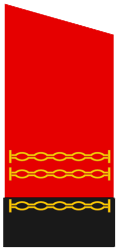
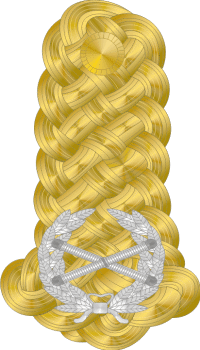
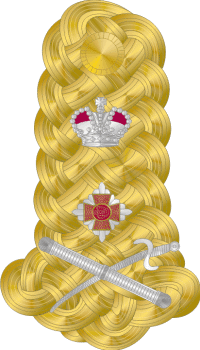
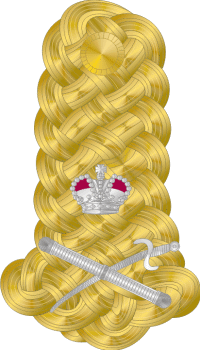
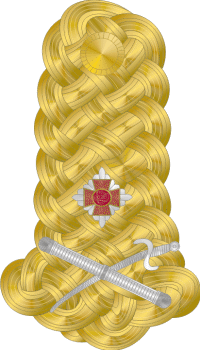
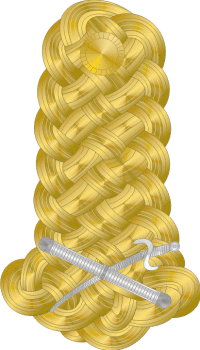
Rank group	Field marshals	General officers				Field officers				Junior officers				Officer cadets
(~1767–1810)
(~1767–1810)	Field marshal	General	Lieutenant-general	Major-general	Brigadier-general		Colonel	Lieutenant-colonel	Major	Adjutant	Captain	Lieutenant	Ensign	Officer cadet
(~1810–1855)
(~1810–1855)	Field marshal	General	Lieutenant-general	Major-general	Brigadier-general	Colonel on the staff	Colonel	Lieutenant-colonel	Major	Adjutant	Captain	Lieutenant	Ensign	Officer cadet
(1855–1864)
(1864–1867)
(1867–1880)
	Field marshal	General	Lieutenant-general	Major-general	Brigadier-general		Colonel	Lieutenant-colonel	Major		Captain	Lieutenant	Second lieutenant	Officer cadet
(1880–1902)
(1880–1902)	Field marshal	General	Lieutenant-general	Major-general	Brigadier-general		Colonel	Lieutenant-colonel	Major		Captain	Lieutenant	Second lieutenant	Officer cadet
(1902–1920)
(1902–1920)	Field marshal	General	Lieutenant-general	Major-general	Brigadier-general		Colonel	Lieutenant-colonel	Major		Captain	Lieutenant	Second lieutenant	Officer cadet
(1920–1921)
(1920–1921)	Field marshal	General	Lieutenant-general	Major-general	Brigadier-general		Colonel	Lieutenant-colonel	Major		Captain	Lieutenant	Second lieutenant	Officer cadet
(1921–1928)
(1921–1928)	Field marshal	General	Lieutenant-general	Major-general		Colonel commandant/ Colonel on the staff	Colonel	Lieutenant-colonel	Major		Captain	Lieutenant	Second lieutenant	Officer cadet
(1928–1953)
	Field marshal	General	Lieutenant-general	Major-general		Brigadier	Colonel	Lieutenant-colonel	Major		Captain	Lieutenant	Second lieutenant	Officer cadet
(1953–2023)
	Field marshal	General	Lieutenant-general	Major-general		Brigadier	Colonel	Lieutenant-colonel	Major		Captain	Lieutenant	Second lieutenant	Officer cadet
(2023–present)
	Field marshal	General	Lieutenant-general	Major-general		Brigadier	Colonel	Lieutenant-colonel	Major		Captain	Lieutenant	Second lieutenant	Officer cadet
NATO Code	OF-10	OF-9	OF-8	OF-7	OF-6		OF-5	OF-4	OF-3	OF-2		OF-1		N/A

=== Historical ranks ===
- Captain-general (c. 17th century): a full general.
- Sergeant-major-general (c. 17th century): shortened to major general.
- (Lieutenant-)Colonel Commandant (c. 19th century): most senior commanding rank in artillery bataillons and regiments, but sometimes also in cavalry (especially when the latter was stationed in India). Around the year 1850, the lieutenant-colonel commandant's rank insignia consisted of two silver stars (while a major had one star, a lieutenant-colonel one crown and a colonel crown and star).
- Captain-lieutenant (c. 17th & 18th century): the lieutenant of the first company in a regiment, whose captaincy was held by the regimental colonel. On promotion to full captain, the period in this rank was treated as having been a full captain for pay and pension purposes, since he effectively commanded the company.
- Ensign: lowest subaltern rank in infantry regiments; replaced in 1871 by second lieutenant, but still used to refer to second lieutenants in some Guards regiments.
- Cornet: cavalry equivalent of ensign replaced in 1871 by second lieutenant, but still used to refer to second lieutenants in some cavalry regiments, including the Blues and Royals and The Queen's Royal Hussars.

== See also ==
- British Army other ranks rank insignia
- Uniforms of the British Army
- List of comparative military ranks
- Comparative officer ranks of World War I
- Comparative officer ranks of World War II
- Ranks and insignia of NATO
- Comparison of United Kingdom and United States military ranks
- Royal Navy officer rank insignia
- RAF officer ranks
- Ranks of the cadet forces of the United Kingdom
