= Captain (Royal Navy) =

Senior officer rank of the Royal Navy

- Shoulder board and sleeve lace
- Country: United Kingdom
- Service branch: Royal Navy
- Abbreviation: Capt
- Rank group: Senior officers
- NATO rank code: OF-5
- Next higher rank: Commodore
- Next lower rank: Commander
- Equivalent ranks: Colonel (RM/British Army); Group captain (RAF)

Captain (Capt.) is a senior officer rank of the Royal Navy. It ranks above commander and below commodore and has a NATO ranking code of OF-5. The rank is equivalent to a colonel in the British Army and Royal Marines, and to a group captain in the Royal Air Force. There are similarly named equivalent ranks in the navies of many other countries.

== Seagoing captains ==
In the Royal Navy, the officer in command of any warship of the rank of commander and below is informally referred to as "the captain" on board, even though holding a junior rank, but formally is titled "the commanding officer" (or CO). Until the nineteenth century Royal Navy officers who were captains by rank and in command of a naval vessel were referred to as post-captains.

Captain (D) or Captain Destroyers, afloat, was an operational appointment commanding a destroyer flotilla or squadron, and there was a corresponding administrative appointment ashore, until at least a decade after the Second World War. The title was probably used informally until the abolition of frigate and destroyer squadrons with the Fleet FIRST reorganisation circa 2001.

== Terminology ==
Ashore, the rank of captain is often verbally described as "captain RN" to distinguish it from the more junior Army and Royal Marines rank, and in naval contexts, as a "four-ring captain" (referring to the uniform lace) to avoid confusion with the title of a seagoing commanding officer. In the Ministry of Defence, and in joint service establishments, a captain may be referred to as a "DACOS" (standing for deputy assistant chief of staff) or an "AH" (assistant head), from the usual job title of OF5-ranked individuals who work with civil servants.

== Insignia and uniform ==
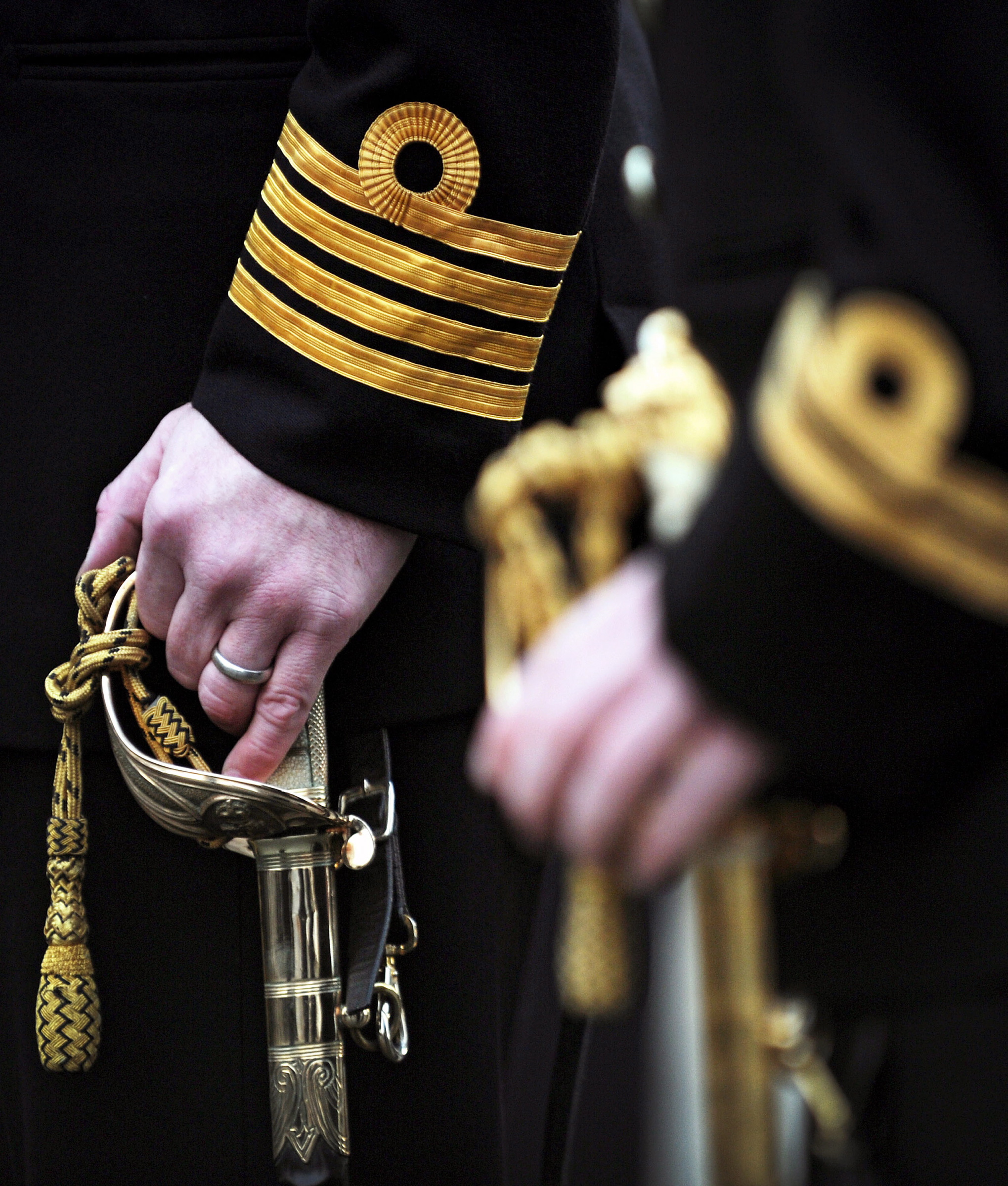
A Royal Navy captain's rank insignia (left, with a lieutenant at right) during divisions conducted at HMNB Clyde in January 2013

The rank insignia features four rings of gold braid with an executive curl in the upper ring.

When in mess dress or mess undress, officers of the rank of captain and above wear gold-laced trousers (the trousers are known as "tin trousers", and the gold lace stripes thereon are nicknamed "lightning conductors"), and may wear the undress tailcoat (without epaulettes).

== See also ==
- British and U.S. military ranks compared
- Captain (United States O-6)
- Comparative military ranks
- Royal Navy officer rank insignia
