= Commander (Royal Navy) =

Senior officer rank of the Royal Navy

- Shoulder board and sleeve lace
- Country: United Kingdom
- Service branch: Royal Navy
- Abbreviation: Cdr
- Rank group: Senior officers
- NATO rank code: OF-4
- Next higher rank: Captain
- Next lower rank: Lieutenant commander
- Equivalent ranks: Lieutenant colonel (RM/British Army); Wing commander (RAF)

Commander (Cdr) is a senior officer rank of the Royal Navy of the United Kingdom. It is immediately junior to captain and immediately senior to the rank of lieutenant commander. Officers holding the junior rank of lieutenant commander are not considered to be commanders.

== History ==
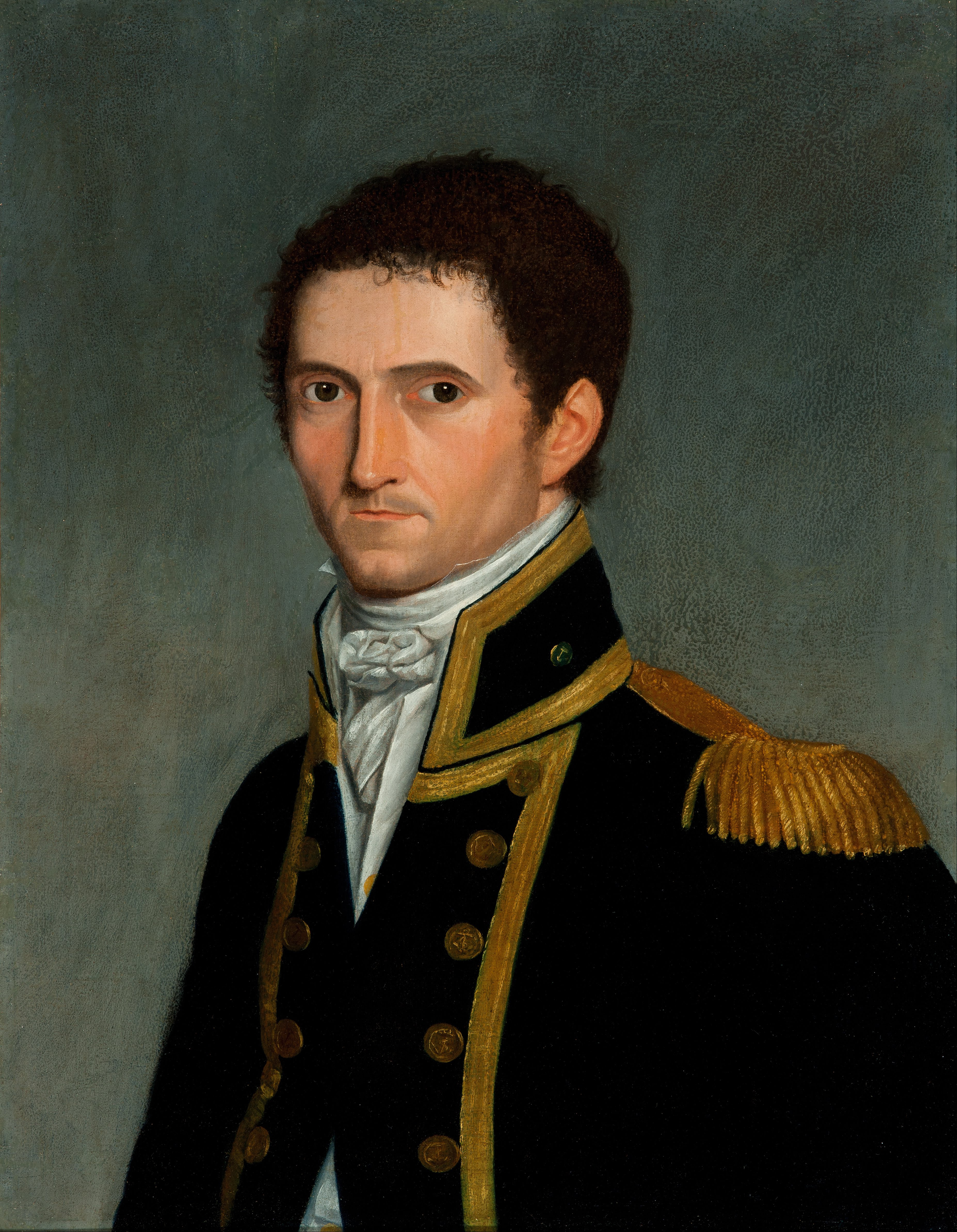
c. 1806–1807 portrait of Matthew Flinders as a commander

The rank of master and commander was introduced into the Royal Navy in 1674 to designate commissioned officers who captained vessels too large to be commanded by a lieutenant but too small to warrant the assignment of a post-captain or before 1770 a master. Such vessels were usually sloops-of-war, bomb vessels, fireships, hospital ships and storeships. The rank's name originated from the fact that its holders were responsible for both overseeing both their vessel's sailing and fighting and was thus its "master and commander".

Before 1750 the rank was broadly considered as the limit of advancement for officers without patronage, especially those who had been promoted from the ranks rather than having joined the Royal Navy as midshipmen. By contrast, those with familial or political connections were far more likely to spend only a nominal period as master and commander before being promoted to post-captain. From 1718 onwards the Navy List began recording an officer's date of appointment to the rank of master and commander with the intention of establishing seniority as a guide to promotion, but there is little evidence that this carried through into actual appointments.

Over the course of the late 18th century the rank evolved into a more regular stage of service between lieutenant and captain. The Admiralty shortened the rank to commander in 1794, though the rank's former name continued to be used in common parlance for several years afterwards. The term "master commanding" (abbreviated as "master com." or "mast. com.") was still recognised in 1851, with the Navy List for that year listing 21 ships commanded by masters with that appellation.

The rank of commander was commonly used during the French Revolutionary and Napoleonic Wars as a reward for officers who distinguished themselves, resulting in the existence of more commanders than there were ships they could command; in 1812 the Navy List recorded 586 commanders against 168 available vessels. Commanders unable to secure a ship were stuck ashore on half-pay with limited prospects for future advancement. This promotion bottleneck was addressed in 1827 when the Admiralty decreed that commanders could serve as second-in-commands on larger vessels. In the 20th and 21st centuries, the rank has been assigned the NATO officer rank code of OF-4, matching the British Army rank of lieutenant colonel.

== Seniority and usage ==
A commander in the Royal Navy is senior to an officer holding the rank of lieutenant commander but junior to a captain. A commander may command a frigate, destroyer, submarine, mine countermeasures squadron, fishery protection squadron, patrol boat squadron, aviation squadron or shore installation, or may serve on a staff. Formerly equivalent to the Army rank of major, a commander is now equivalent in rank to a lieutenant colonel in the British Army or a wing commander in the Royal Air Force. The rank of wing commander was derived from the naval rank of commander via the usage in the World War I Royal Naval Air Service.

The rank insignia of a commander features three rings of gold braid with a loop in the upper ring.

== See also ==
- British and U.S. military ranks compared
- Comparative military ranks
- Royal Navy officer rank insignia
