= Second lieutenant =

Junior commissioned officer military rank

Second lieutenant is a junior commissioned officer military rank in many armed forces. The lowest officer rank, it is usually placed below lieutenant or first lieutenant.

== Australia ==
The rank of second lieutenant existed in the military forces of the Australian colonies and Australian Army until 1986.

In the colonial forces, which closely followed the practices of the British military, the rank of second lieutenant began to replace ranks such as ensign and cornet from 1871.

New appointments to the rank of second lieutenant ceased in the regular army in 1986. Immediately prior to this change, the rank had been effectively reserved for new graduates from the Officer Cadet School, Portsea which closed in 1985. (Graduates of the Australian Defence Force Academy (ADFA) and the Royal Military College, Duntroon (RMC-D) are commissioned as lieutenants.). The rank of second lieutenant is only appointed to officers in special appointments such as training institutions, university regiments and while under probation during training. Trainees undertaking Special Service Officer (SSO) training are appointed at their officer rank prior to undertaking the training (usually as lieutenants or captains). This is different to General Service Officer (GSO) trainees who start off at the rank of officer cadet (ADFA/Australian Army Reserve officer trainees) or staff cadet (Royal Military College, Duntroon).

Ranks equivalent to second lieutenant are acting sub-lieutenant in the Royal Australian Navy and pilot officer in the Royal Australian Air Force.

== Canada ==
The Canadian Forces adopted the rank with insignia of a single gold ring around the service dress uniform cuff for both army and air personnel upon unification in 1968 until the late 2000s. For a time, naval personnel used this rank but reverted to the Royal Canadian Navy rank of acting sub-lieutenant, though the CF green uniform was retained until the mid-1980s. Currently, the Canadian Army insignia for second lieutenant is a pip and the Royal Canadian Air Force insignia for lieutenant is one thick braid. The equivalent rank for the Royal Canadian Navy is acting sub-lieutenant. Also known as an ensign in the Foot Guards units (Canadian Grenadier Guards & Governor General's Foot Guards).

== France ==
Sous-lieutenant is the most junior commissioned rank in the modern French Army, Airforce and Gendarmerie. It dates historically from the late XVIth Century in the reign of Henry II of France. In 1674 this designation replaced that of ensign in the French infantry. By 1791 there were two sous-lieutenants in each company. After 1781 entry to this rank and beyond required four quartering of nobility - that is for all four grandparents to be recognised members of the aristocracy. The French Revolution substituted election by popular vote and later, under Napoleon, by graduation from officers' military schools or after four years of service as a sous-officer (NCO).

Until World War I sous-lieutenants were distinguished by a single gold fringed epaulette worn on the right shoulder (silver for cavalry). Modern rank insignia is reduced to a single braid stripe on each shoulder strap and (when worn) kepi.

== Indonesia ==
In Indonesia, "second lieutenant" is known as letnan dua (letda) which is the most junior ranked officer in the Indonesian Military. Officers in the Indonesian National Armed Forces are commissioned through one of four major commissioning programs. Upon graduation the candidates are promoted to the rank of second lieutenant, thus becoming commissioned officers. The four programs are:

- National Armed Forces Academy (Akademi TNI): a four-year undergraduate program that emphasizes instruction in the arts, sciences, and professions, preparing men and women to take on the challenge of being officers in the armed forces (Army: Military Academy, Navy: Naval Academy, Air Force: Air Force Academy);
- Officer Candidate School: a 28-week program that is attended by senior NCOs or warrant officers from all services;
- Career Officer Program for college graduates: a 7–8 month program that is designed to recruit civilian professionals (e.g., doctors, dentists, pharmacists, psychologists) into the armed forces;
- Pilot Short Service School: a 34-month program to train pilots to serve in the armed forces.

== New Zealand ==
Like many other Commonwealth countries, the rank structures of the New Zealand Defence Force usually follow British traditions. Hence the New Zealand Army maintains a rank of second lieutenant and the Royal New Zealand Air Force has its exact equivalent, pilot officer.

However, the Royal New Zealand Navy breaks with British tradition and uses the name ensign for its most junior commissioned officer rank (rather than the usual equivalents, such as acting sub-lieutenant or second lieutenant).

== United Kingdom and other Commonwealth countries (except Australia, Bangladesh, and Canada) ==
The rank of second lieutenant (2Lt) was introduced throughout the British Army in 1877 to replace the short-lived rank of sub-lieutenant, although it had long been used in the Royal Artillery, Royal Engineers, Fusilier and Rifle regiments. At first the rank bore no distinct insignia. The rank was abolished in 1881 but reintroduced in 1887. In 1902, a single Bath star was introduced; the ranks of lieutenant and captain had their number of stars increased by one to (respectively) two and three. The rank is also used by the Royal Marines.

New British Army officers are normally commissioned as second lieutenants at the end of their commissioning course at RMA Sandhurst where they hold the rank of Officer Cadet, and continue with specific training with their units. Progression to lieutenant rank usually occurs after about a year. In the British armed forces, second lieutenant is a rank which is not used as a form of address. Instead a second lieutenant named, for example, Smith is addressed and referred to as Mr Smith, with the exception that the alternative titles ensign (Foot Guards) and cornet (in the Blues and Royals and Queen's Royal Hussars) are still used. In the Royal Air Force, the comparable rank is pilot officer. The equivalent in the Royal Navy is midshipman.

== United States ==
Second Lieutenant
- 2nd Lieutenant Rank Pin Insignia

- 2nd Lieutenant Shoulder straps Army, Marines, Air Force, Space Force
- Country: United States
- Service branch: United States Army; United States Marine Corps; United States Air Force; United States Space Force
- Abbreviation: 2LT (USA) 2ndLt (USMC); 2d Lt (USAF) 2d Lt (USSF)
- Rank group: Company Grade Officer
- NATO rank code: OF-1
- Pay grade: O-1
- Next higher rank: First lieutenant
- Equivalent ranks: Ensign

In the United States, second lieutenant is the normal entry-level rank for most commissioned officers in the Army, Marine Corps, Air Force, and Space Force. It is equivalent to the rank of ensign in the Navy, Coast Guard, Public Health Service Commissioned Corps, and National Oceanic and Atmospheric Administration Commissioned Officer Corps.

In the Army and Marine Corps, a second lieutenant typically is a platoon leader who leads a platoon-size element, usually consisting of 16 to 44 soldiers or marines. A rifle platoon is composed of several squads with each squad led by a non-commissioned officer as squad leader. The second lieutenant is usually assisted by a platoon sergeant who advises and supports the platoon's commanding officer in leading the unit.

In the Army, the rank bore no insignia until December 1917, when a gold-colored bar similar to the silver-colored bar of a first lieutenant was introduced. In U.S. military slang, the rank is sometimes called "butterbar" or "brown bar" in reference to the insignia, while "shavetail"—a reference to an unbroken mule—is a derisive nickname.

== Bangladesh ==
The rank of second lieutenant has existed in the Bangladesh Army since the Liberation War. It is a rank below lieutenant and it is the junior most officer rank in the army. In the Army, a second lieutenant serves as the administrative officer or staff officer in a unit. In the Navy, the rank of second lieutenant does not exist, its equivalent is acting sub-lieutenant.

== Gallery ==
=== Army ===
Second lieutenant
(Antigua and Barbuda Regiment)

Second lieutenant
(Australian Army)

সেকেন্ড লেফটেন্যান্ট
Sēkēnḍa lēphaṭēn'yānṭa
(Bangladesh Army)

Second lieutenant
(Barbados Regiment)

Second lieutenant
(Belize Defence Force)

Onderluitenant
(Belgian Army)

Second lieutenant
(Botswana Ground Force)

Segundo tenente
(Brazilian Army)

Second lieutenant
(French: Sous-lieutenant)
(Canadian Army)

Sekondløjtnant
(Royal Danish Army)

Segundo teniente
(Dominican Army)

Second lieutenant
(Fiji Infantry Regiment)

Second lieutenant
(Gambian National Army)

Second lieutenant
(Ghana Army)

Second lieutenant
(Guyana Army)

Letnan dua
(Indonesian Army)

Second-lieutenant
(Irish: Dara-lefteanant)
(Irish Army)

Second lieutenant
(Jamaican Army)

Second lieutenant
(Kenya Army)

Second lieutenant
(Lesotho Army)

Second lieutenant
(Liberian Ground Forces)

Second lieutenant
(Malawi Army)

Second lieutenant
(Maltese: Sekond logutenent)
(Army of Malta)

Second lieutenant
(Namibian Army)

Tweede luitenant
(Royal Netherlands Army)

Second lieutenant
(New Zealand Army)

Second lieutenant
(Nigerian Army)

سیکنڈ لیفٹیننٹ
Saikanḍ lephtinent
(Pakistan Army)

Second lieutenant
(Papua New Guinea Land Element)

Second lieutenant
(Rwandan Land Forces)

Second lieutenant
(SKN Regiment)

Second lieutenant
(Seychelles Army)

Second lieutenant
(Singapore Army)

Second lieutenant
(South African Army)

Second lieutenant
(Sri Lanka Army)

Tweede Luitenant
(Suriname Army)

Luteni usu
(Tanzanian Army)

Second lieutenant
(Trinidad and Tobago Regiment)

Second lieutenant
(Ugandan Land Forces)

Second lieutenant
(British Army)

Second lieutenant
(United States Army)

Teniente segundo
(National Army of Uruguay)

Second lieutenant
(Zambian Army)

Second lieutenant
(Zimbabwe National Army)

=== Marines ===
Segundo-tenente fuzileiro naval
(Brazilian Marine Corps)

Letnan dua
(Indonesian Marine Corps)

Second lieutenant
ލެފްޓިނަންޓް
(Maldivian Marine Corps)

2e Luitenant
(Netherlands Marine Corps)

Segundo-tenente fuzileiro
(Portuguese Marine Corps)

Second lieutenant
(Royal Marines)
(United Kingdom)

Second lieutenant
(United States Marine Corps)

=== Navy ===
Segundo-tenente
(Brazilian Navy)

Segundo-tenente
(Navy of Guinea-Bissau)

Letnan dua
(Indonesian Navy)

Second lieutenant
(Kenya Navy)

Second lieutenant
(Malawi Navy)

Second lieutenant
ލެފްޓިނަންޓް
(Maldivian Coast Guard)

Second lieutenant
Sekond logutenent
(Maritime Squadron of Malta)

Segundo-tenente
(Mozambique Naval Command)

Teniente segundo
(Peruvian Navy)

Segundo-tenente
(Portuguese Navy)

Segundo-tenente
(Coast Guard of São Tomé and Príncipe)

Second lieutenant
(Seychelles Coast Guard)

Second lieutenant
(Republic of Singapore Navy)

Segundo-tenente
(Timor-Leste Naval Component)

=== Air Force ===
Second lieutenant
(Botswana Defence Force Air Wing)

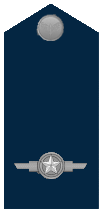
Segundo-tenente
(Brazilian Air Force)

Second lieutenant
Sous-lieutenant
(Royal Canadian Air Force)

Sekondløjtnant
(Royal Danish Air Force)

Segundo teniente
(Dominican Air Force)

Letnan dua
(Indonesian Air Force)

Second lieutenant
Dara-leifteanant
(Irish Air Corps)

Second lieutenant
(Jamaica Defence Force Air Wing)

Second lieutenant
(Kenya Air Force)

Second lieutenant
(Lesotho Air Squadron)

Second lieutenant
(Liberian Air Wing)

Second lieutenant
(Malawi Air Force)

Tweede-luitenant
(Royal Netherlands Air Force)

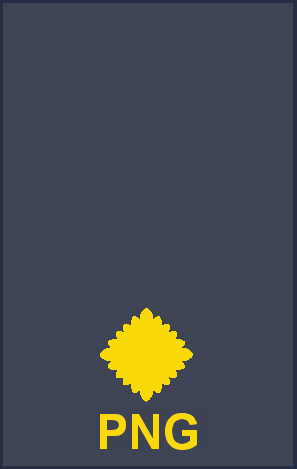
Second lieutenant
(Papua New Guinea Air Element)

Second lieutenant
(Philippine Air Force)

Second lieutenant
(Rwandan Air Force)

Second lieutenant
(Republic of Singapore Air Force)

Second lieutenant
(Seychelles Air Force)

Second lieutenant
Tweede luitenant
(South African Air Force)

Second lieutenant
(Tanzania Air Force Command)

Second lieutenant
(Uganda Air Force)

Teniente segundo
(Uruguayan Air Force)

Second lieutenant
(United States Air Force)

Second lieutenant
(Zambian Air Force)

=== Space Force ===
Second lieutenant
(United States Space Force)

== See also ==
- British Army officer rank insignia
- Comparative military ranks
- Cornet (military rank)
- U.S. Army officer rank insignia
- Military ranks of Ukraine
- Podporuchik
- Unterleutnant
- Leutnant
- South African military ranks
