= Officer cadet (British Armed Forces) =

British Military Rank

- Insignia (from left to right Army, RM, RAF, RN)
- Country: United Kingdom
- Service branch: British Army; Royal Marines; Royal Air Force; Royal Navy
- Abbreviation: OCdt (Army & RM); OC (RN); Off Cdt (RAF)
- Rank group: training
- NATO rank code: N/A
- Next higher rank: Second lieutenant (Army & RM); Midshipman (RN); Pilot officer (RAF)

Officer cadet is a rank used by the branches of the British Armed Forces, with slight differences between the branches. It is used by personnel who are undergoing officer training, prior to them commissioning as Officers. The rank has no command authority and is not saluted or addressed as Sir or Ma'am.

The rank does not have a NATO code, but codes such as OF-0 and OF-D have been used informally to categorise the rank.

== British Army ==
Officer Cadet (OCdt) is used by British Army personnel whilst training at the Royal Military Academy Sandhurst (RMAS) or at the University Officers Training Corps (UOTC).

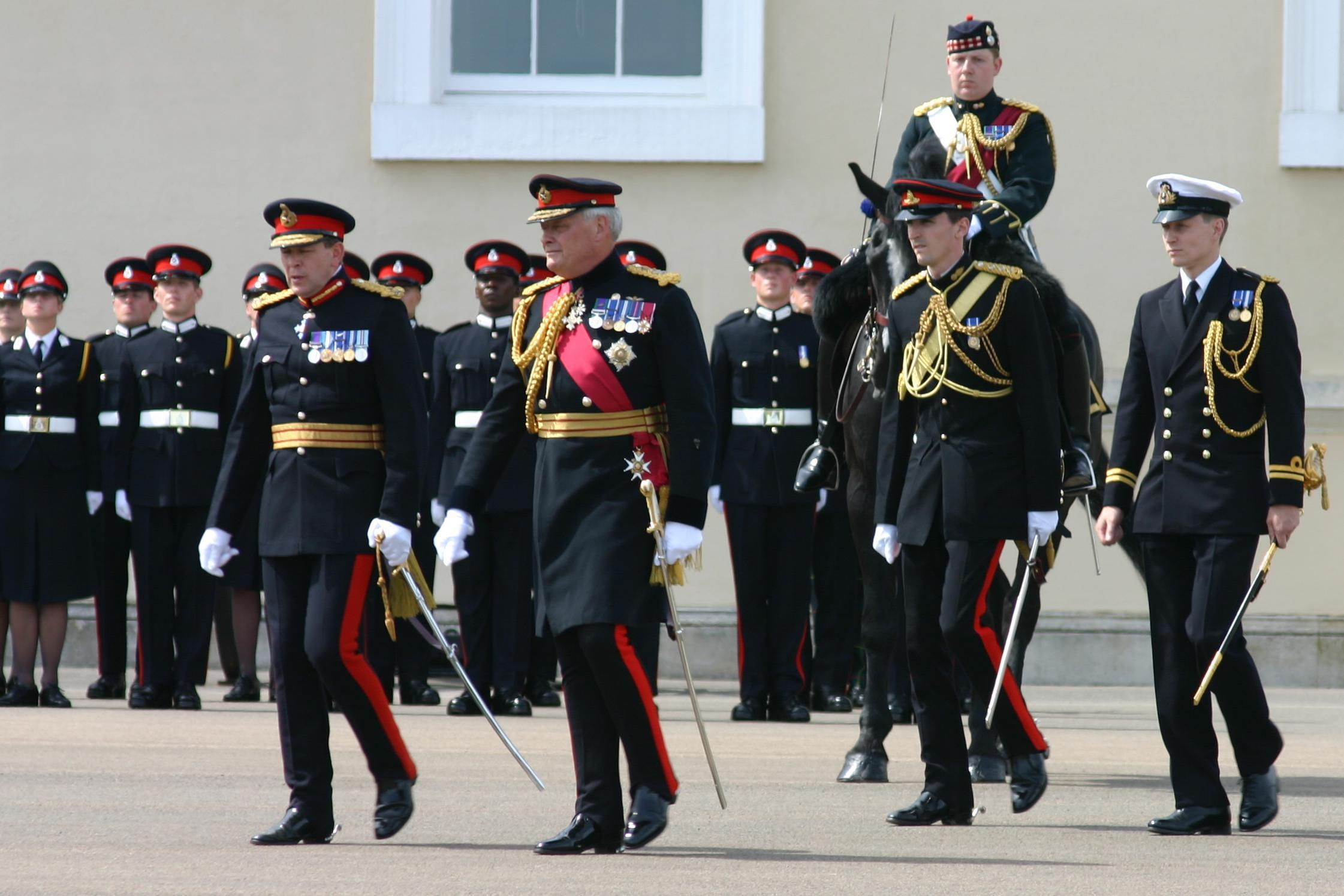
British Army Officer Cadets (Background) in No. 1 Dress

It is ranked as the most junior rank held by Officers during their Initial Officer Training and carries no command authority, although Officer Cadets can be appointed to positions internal to their units such as Senior Under Officer, which may grant them limited authority over their peers, however their substantive rank remains as Officer Cadet with Under Officer being an appointment rather than a rank.

Officer Cadets are not saluted as they don't hold the King's Commission, and are not addressed as Sir or Ma'am, rather being addressed as OCdt [Surname] or (Similarly to Second Lieutenants) as Mr/Ms [Surname] as appropriate.

The Rank Insignia for an Officer Cadet is a horizontal bar. However Officer Cadets in the UOTC may wear additional bars to denote their progression in their training. Officer Cadets appointed to Under Officer appointments will wear a rank slide with an Austrian knot with lines underneath to denote the seniority of the Under Officer. The No.1 Dress for Officer Cadets features white collar tabs on their tunic to denote their rank, with rank also being denoted by white tabs on their No. 2 Dress uniform.

Prior to the Second World War, cadets at the former Royal Military Academy, Woolwich and the former Royal Military College, Sandhurst were referred to as gentleman cadets. Scarlet and blue dress uniforms had been worn by Sandhurst cadets prior to 1914 but between the Wars khaki was the normal parade uniform, with dark blue "patrols" reserved for formal evening events. The white collar gorgets which form a distinctive feature of modern cadet uniforms were adopted after 1945.

=== Under Officer Appointments ===
The appointments that an Officer Cadet can be appointed to are

Appointment	Abbreviation	Usage	Notes
Junior Under Officer	JUO	RMAS & UOTC	
Company Under Officer	CUO	UOTC Only (Selected Larger Units)	
Senior Under Officer	SUO	RMAS & UOTC	

The SUO of a regular commissioning course at Sandhurst will typically escort the Sovereign or his representative, when inspecting the newly commissioning Officer Cadets at the Sovereigns parade.

== Royal Navy ==
Officer Cadet (OC) is used by Royal Navy personnel whilst undergoing officer training as Britannia Royal Naval College or whilst part of a University Royal Naval Unit, and is the most junior position held by officers during their training. Unlike other branches, the rank of Officer Cadet in the Royal Navy is non substantive and only used in the initial stages of officer training.

Officer Cadets do not wear any insignia during the militarisation term of their training. They will then wear a small white tab over a black background for the marinisation term. Officer Cadets are not addressed as Sir or Ma'am and are not saluted as they do not hold the Kings Commission.

Formerly, cadets at the Royal Naval College, Osborne, and Dartmouth, had the substantive rank of "naval cadet", or "cadet, RN" until passing out of Dartmouth as a midshipman.

=== Royal Marines ===
Officer Cadet (OCdt) is a rank used by personnel undergoing initial Royal Marines officer training at CTCRM Lympstone.

== Royal Air Force ==
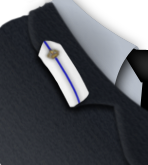
Rank insignia for Royal Air Force Officer Cadet (service dress)

Officer Cadet (Off Cdt) is a rank used by RAF Personnel during their initial officer training at the Royal Air Force College Cranwell. Students undergoing the Foundation Degree course at DCAE Cosford, having been selected for service as engineer officers from the ranks, hold their previous rank while wearing officer cadet rank insignia for the duration, prior to attending initial officer training. The rank is also held by personnel of University Air Squadrons.

Officer cadets wear white tabs with varying colours to denote stages in training and what arm they belong to, with members of the UAS wearing a blue line through the collar tab. The cap badge is the same as that worn by a commissioned officer (between the ranks of pilot officer and group captain), but with a white band around the cap. This band is removed on graduation. The only exception being Officer Cadets of the UAS who wear an airman's cap badge instead of the officer cap badge.

RAF Officer Cadets are not addressed as Sir or Ma'am and are not saluted as they do not hold the Kings Commission.

== See also ==
- Officer cadet, broadly covering the ranks equivalents and international usage
- Military academy
