= Comparative navy enlisted ranks of Europe =

Rank comparison chart of all navies of European states. Some European countries do not have naval forces, either because they are landlocked, such as Austria, Belarus, the Czech Republic, Moldova, Luxembourg, Bosnia & Herzegovina, Kosovo, Slovakia, San Marino and the Vatican (enclaves with Italy), or naval duties provided by another state such as Monaco (provided by France).

== Other ranks ==
The rank insignia of non-commissioned officers and enlisted personnel.

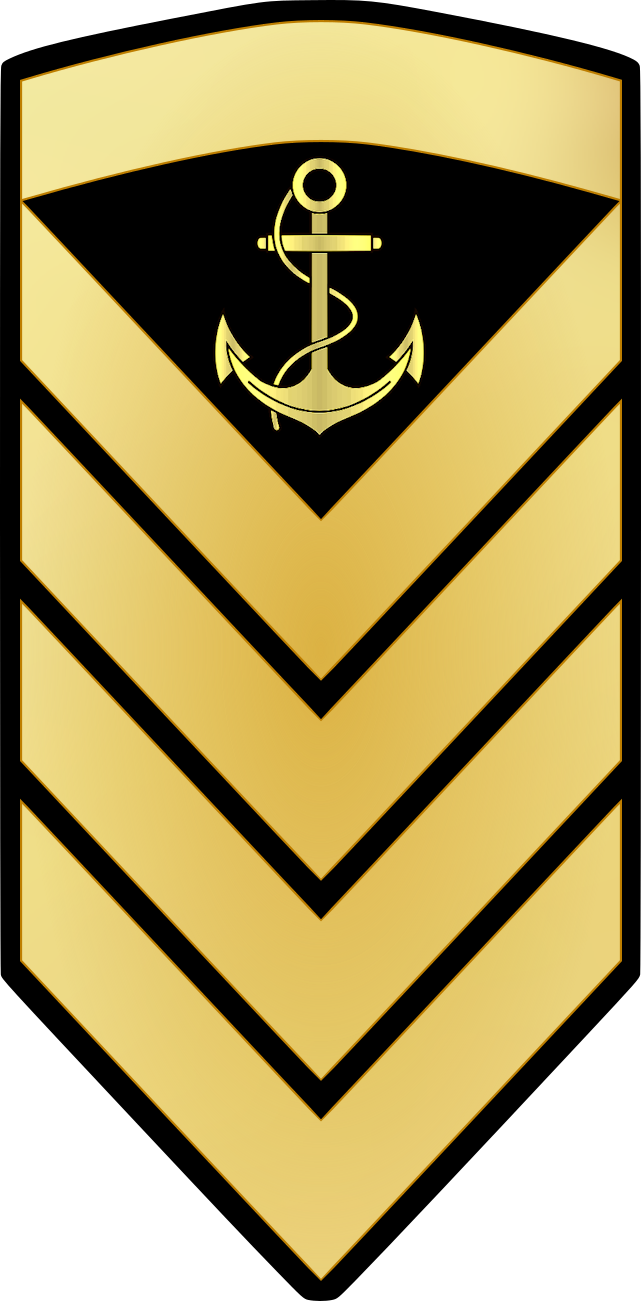
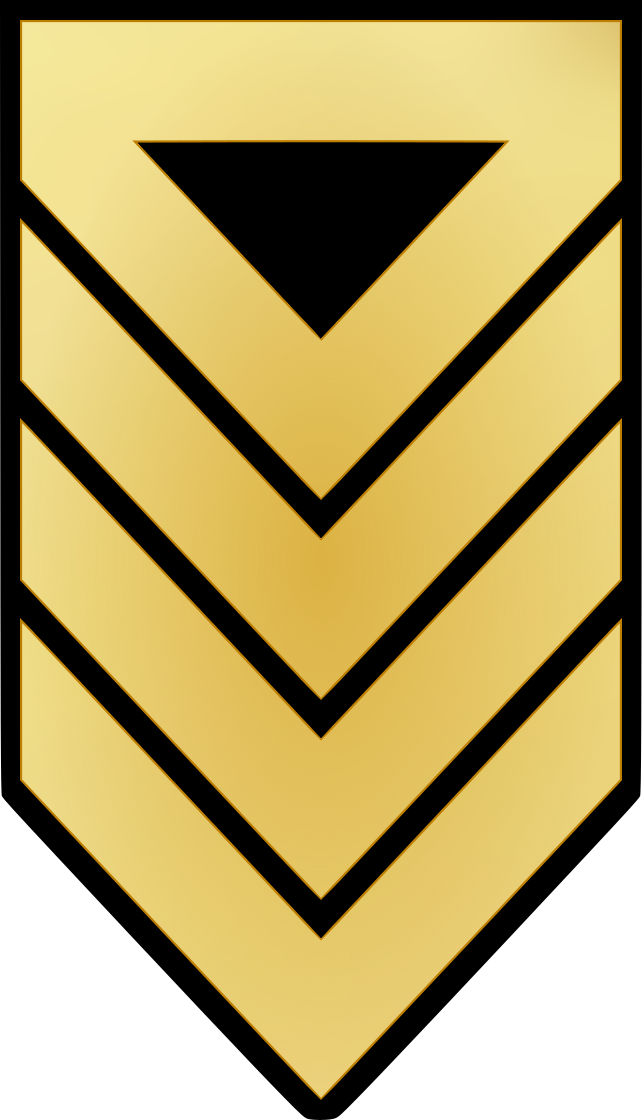
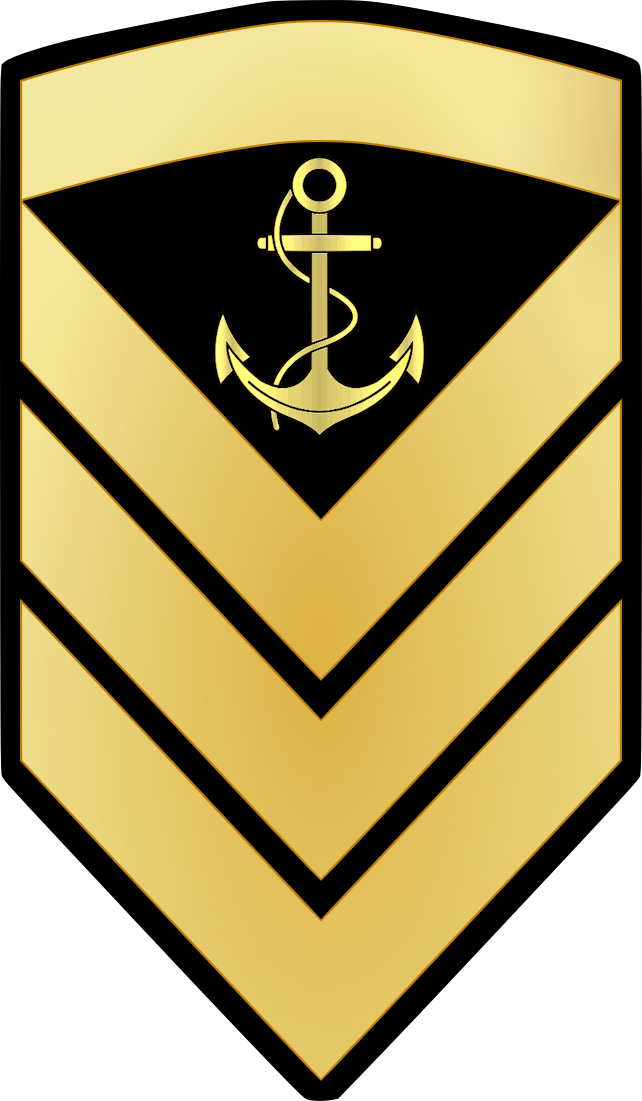
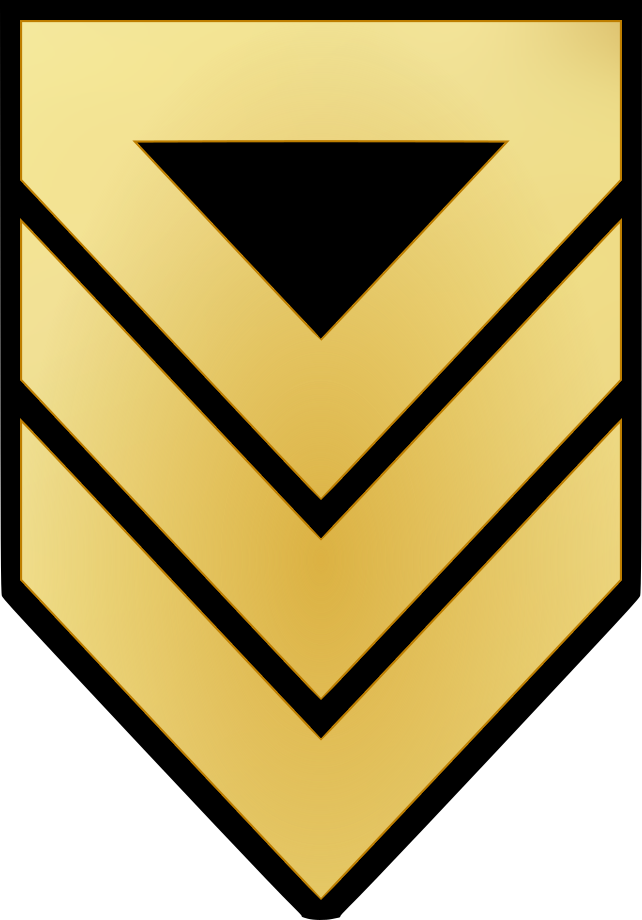
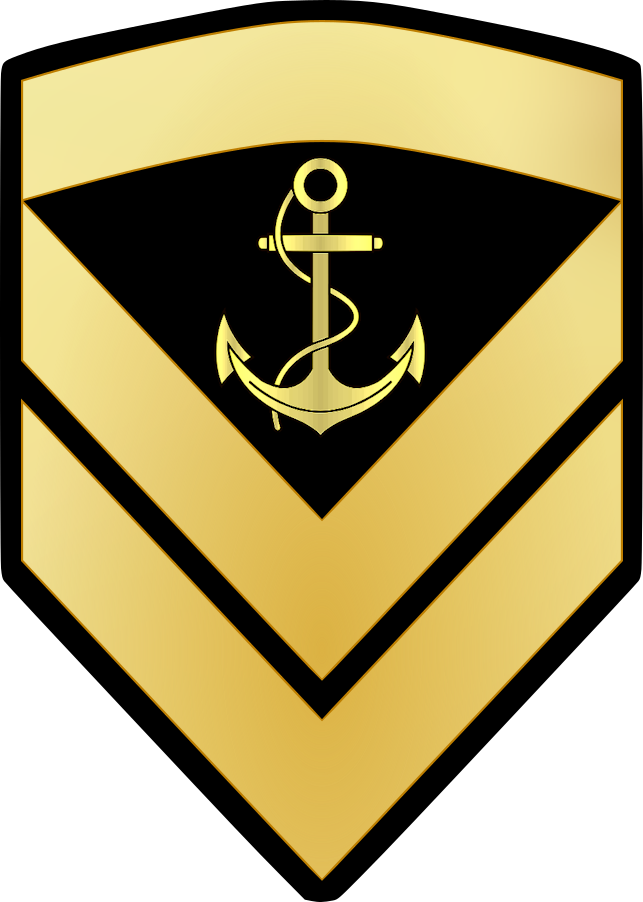
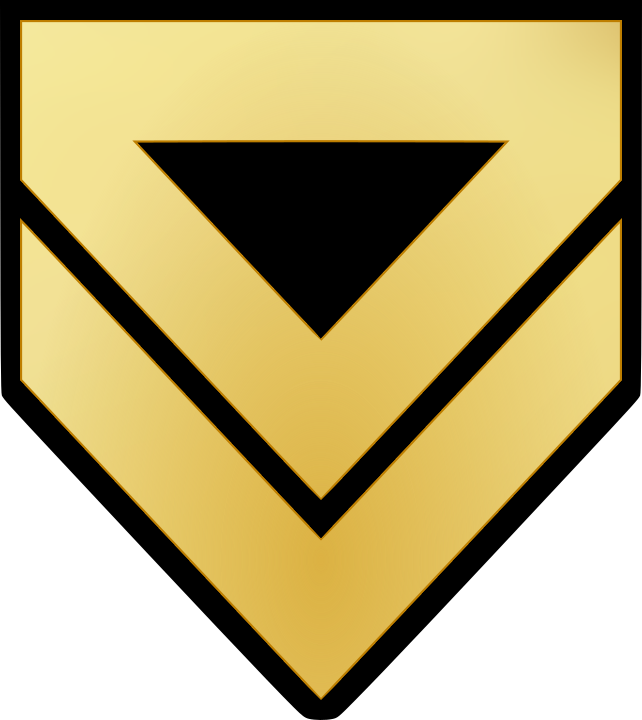
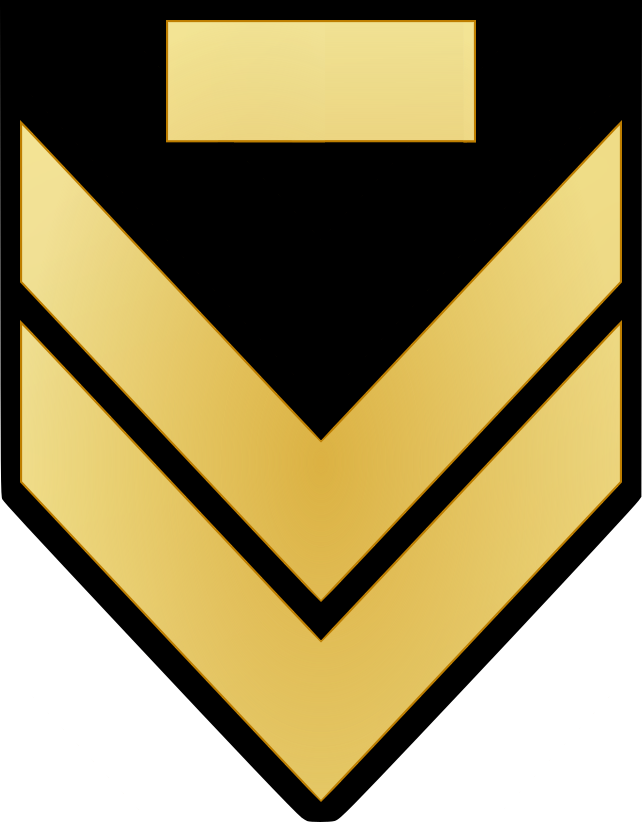
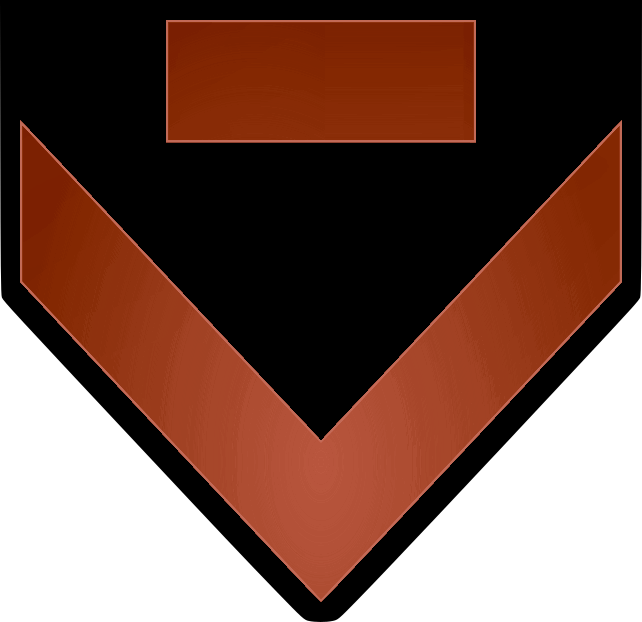
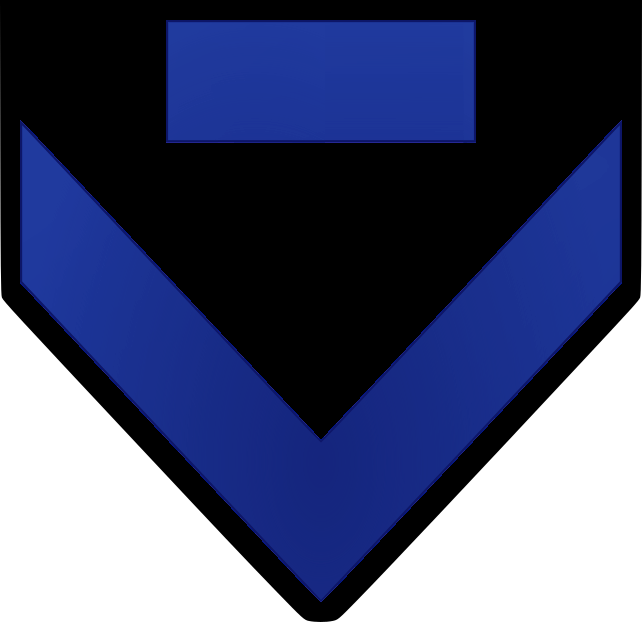
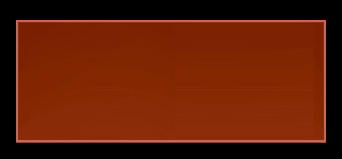
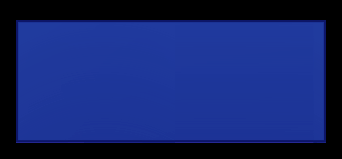
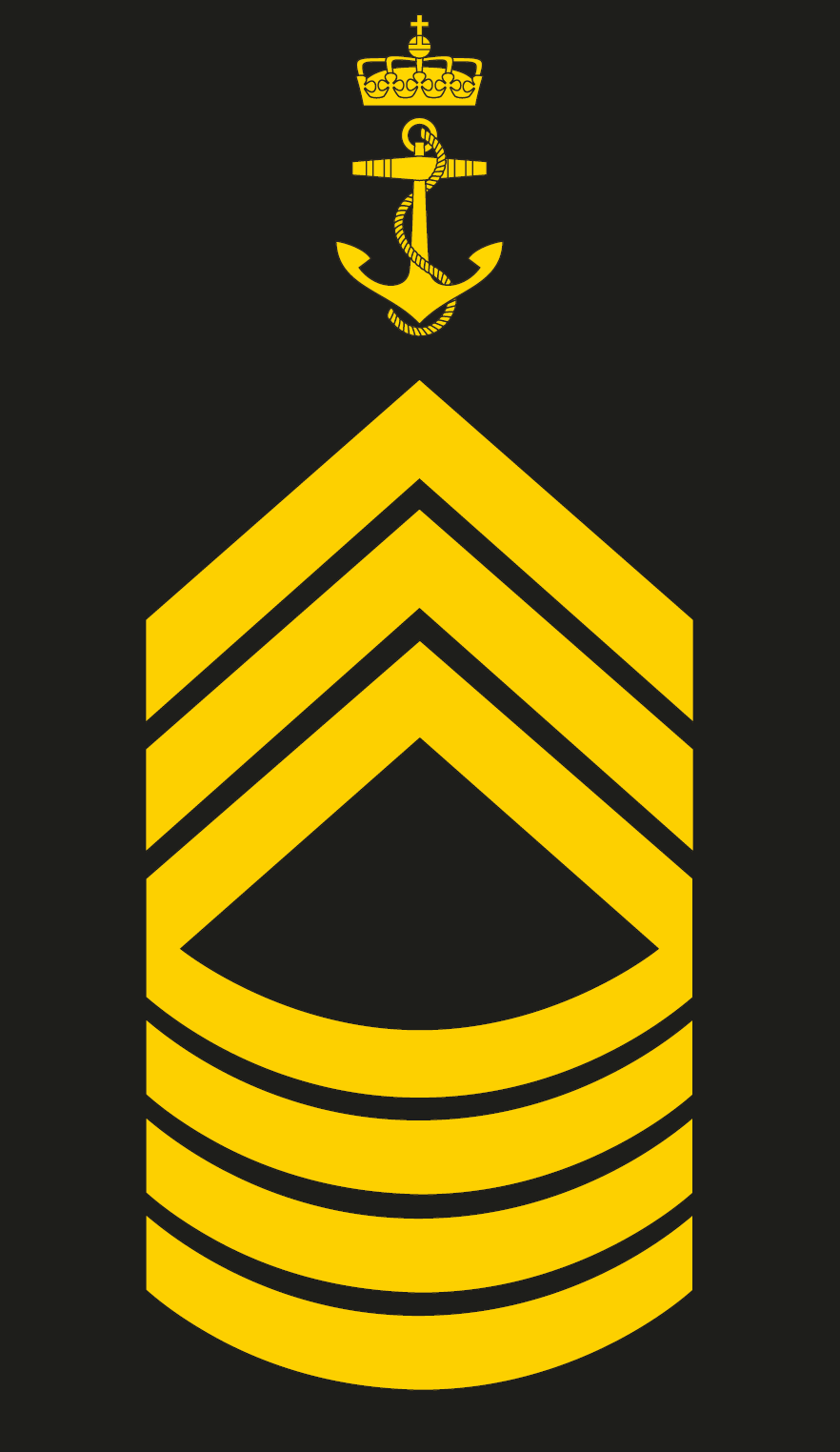
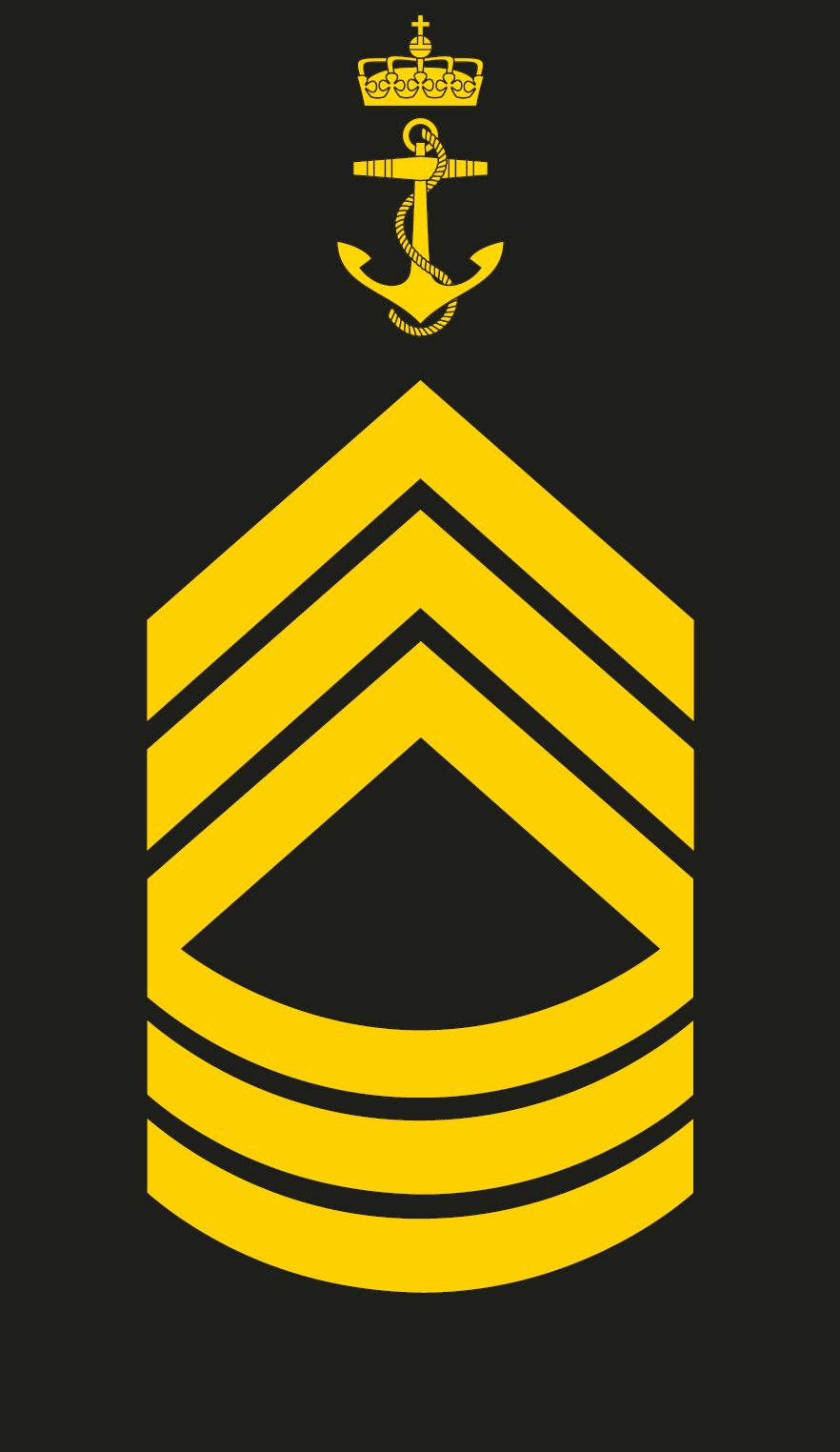
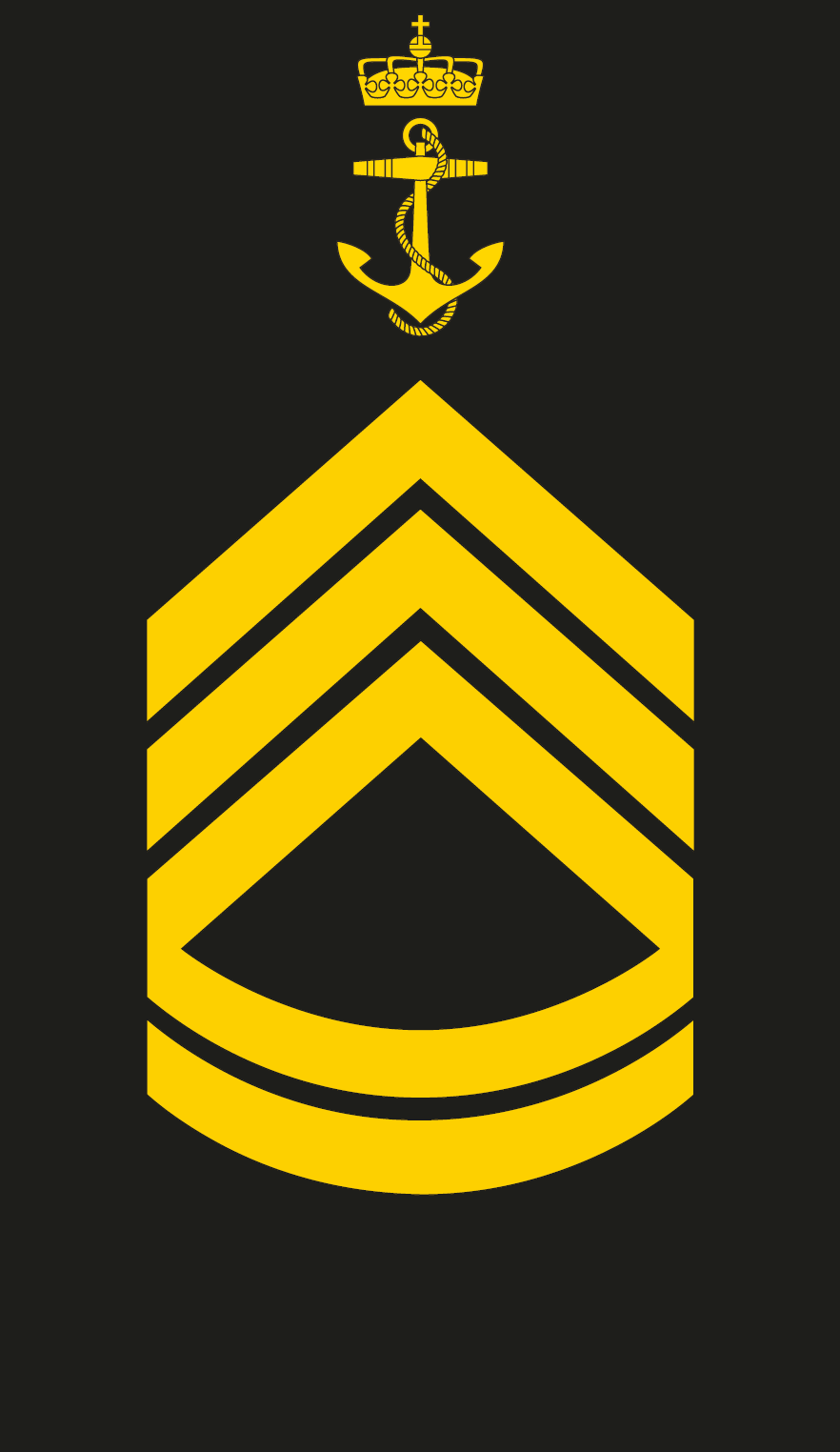
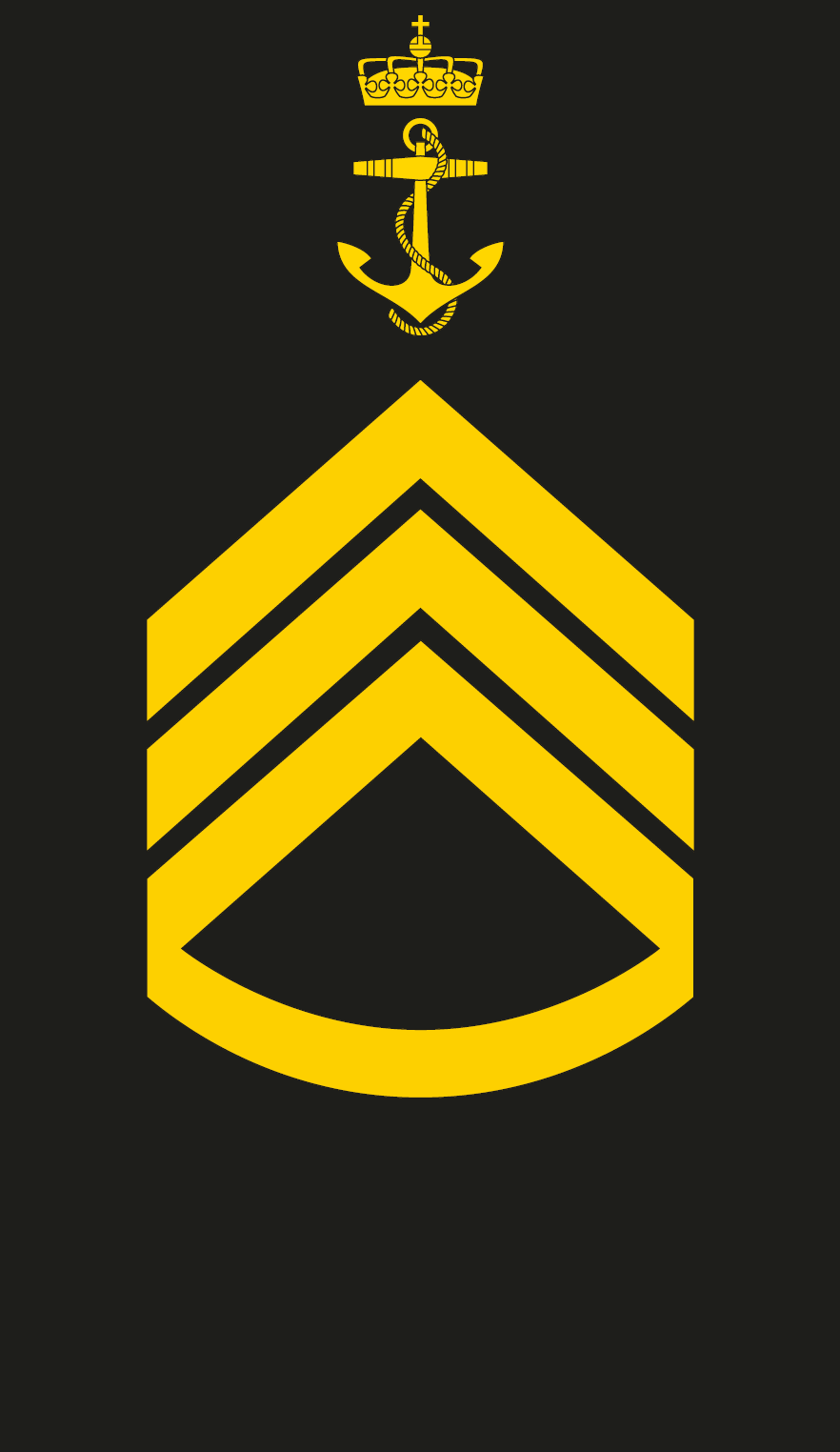
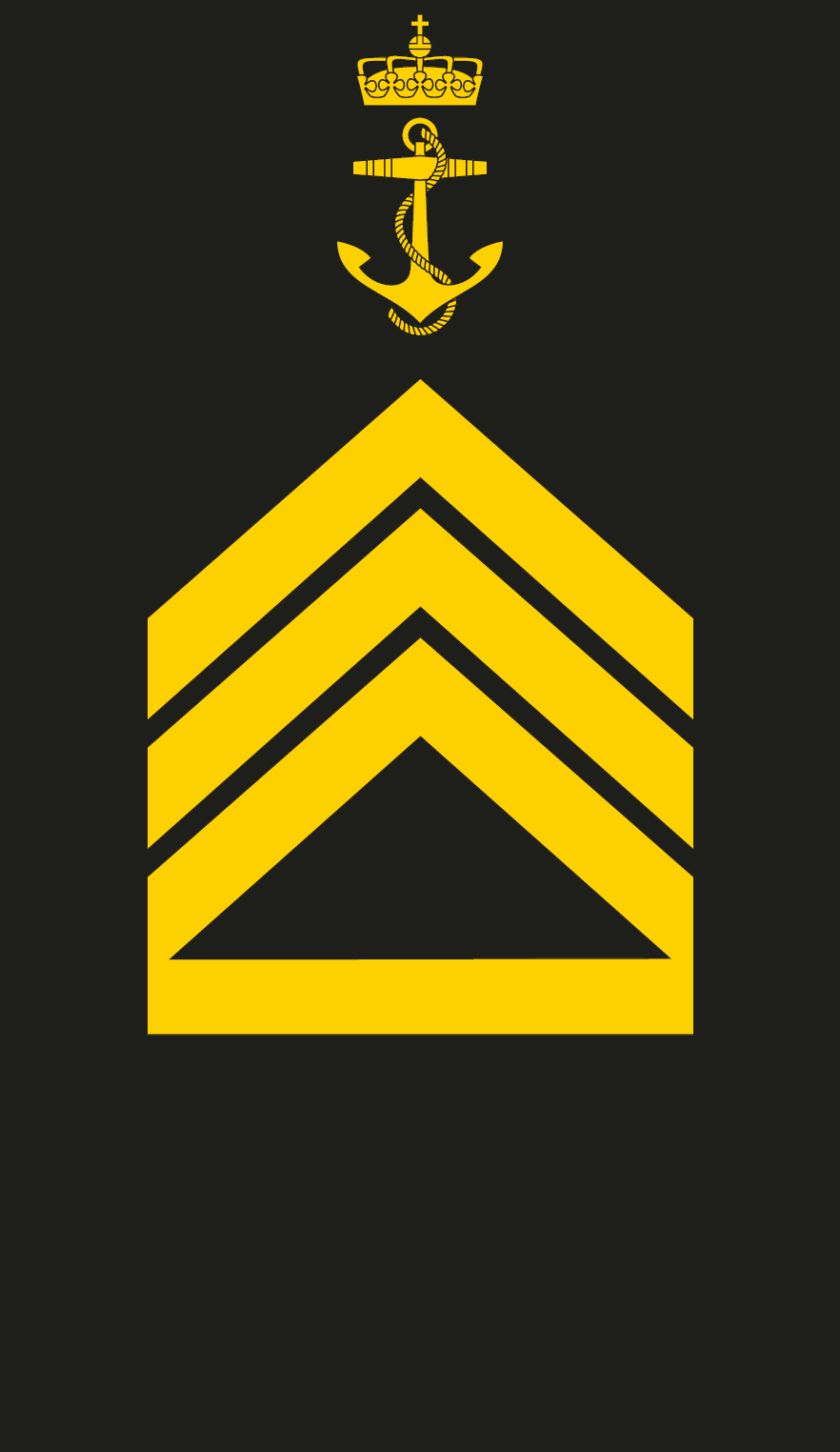
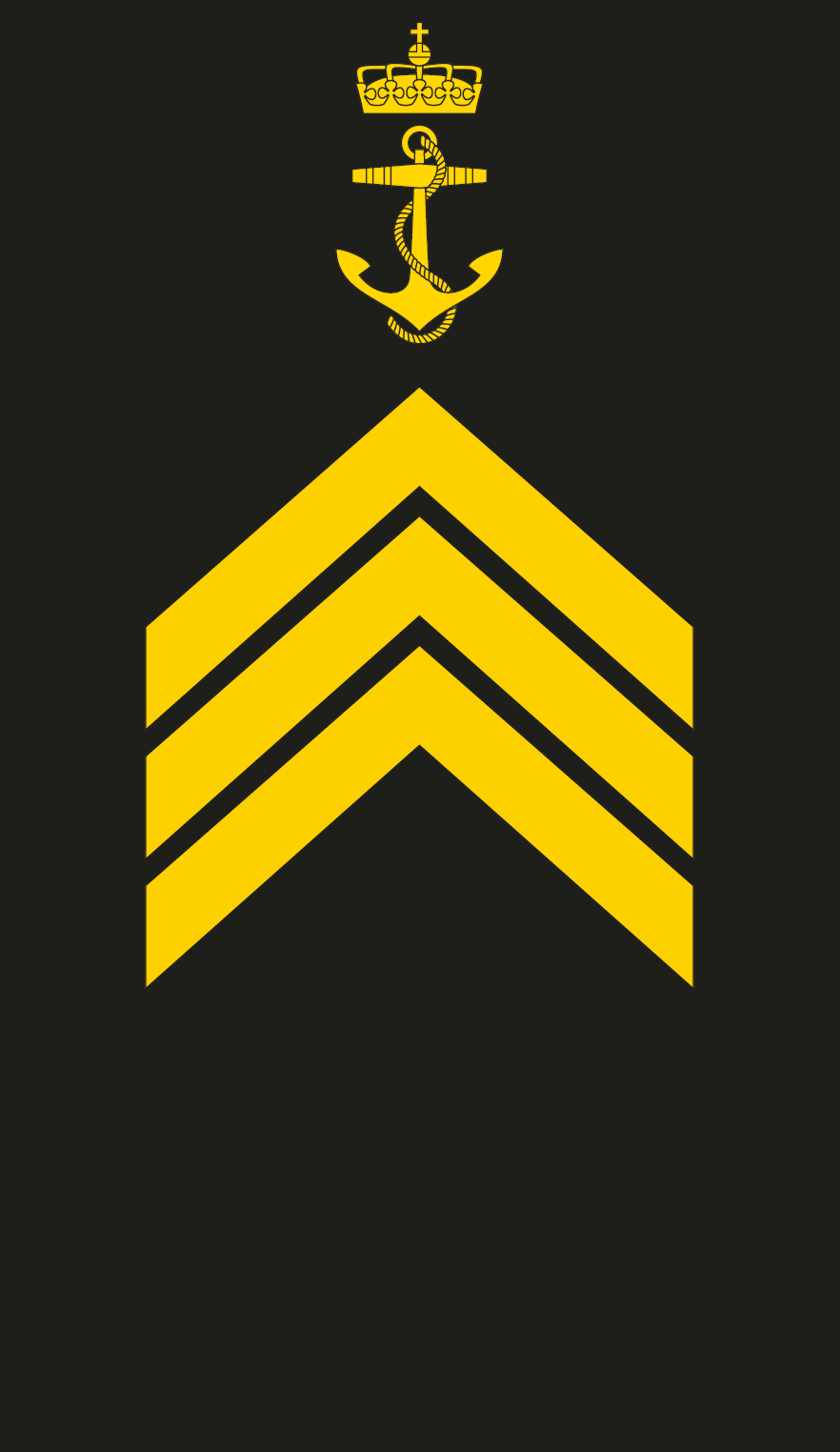
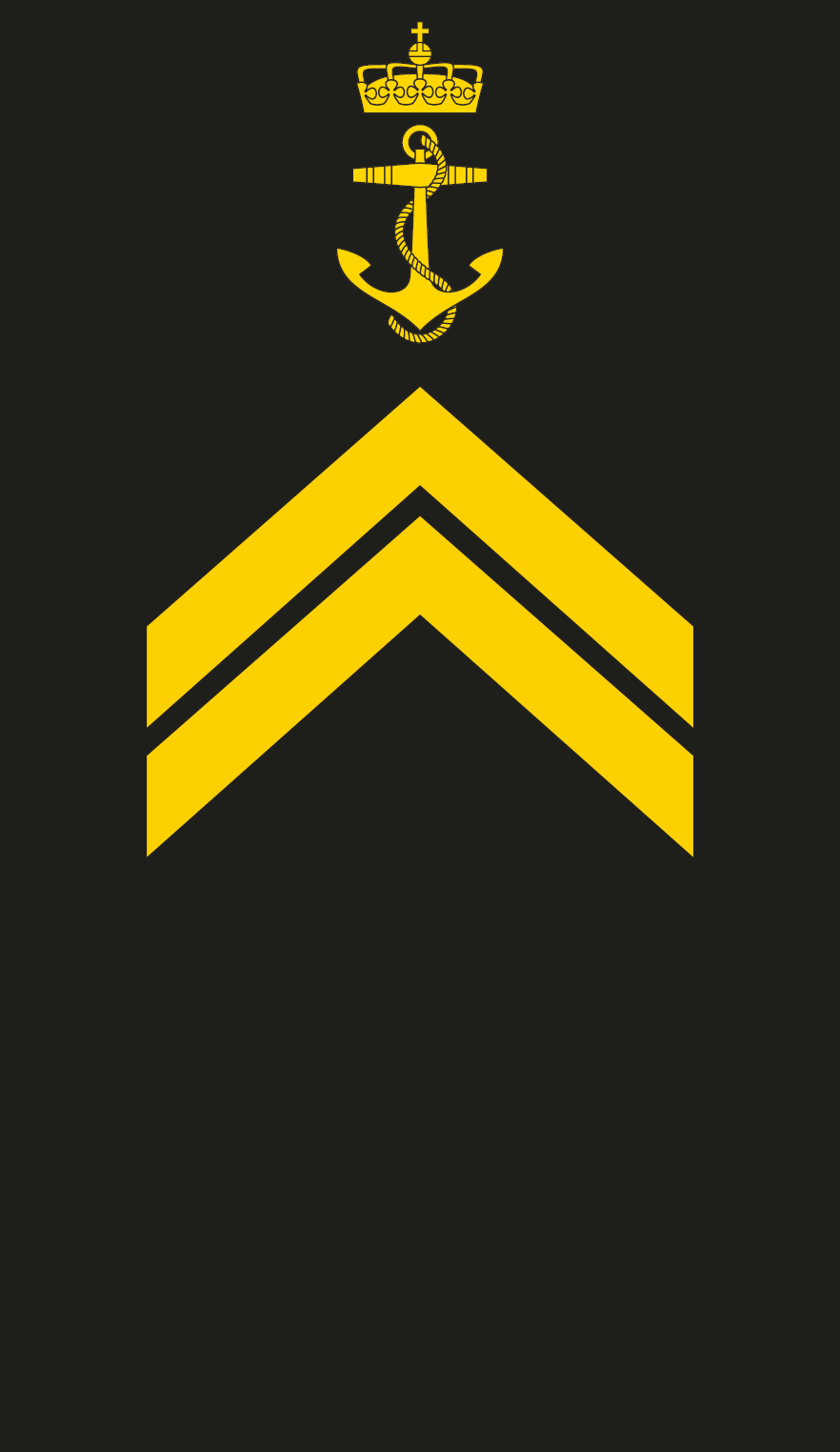
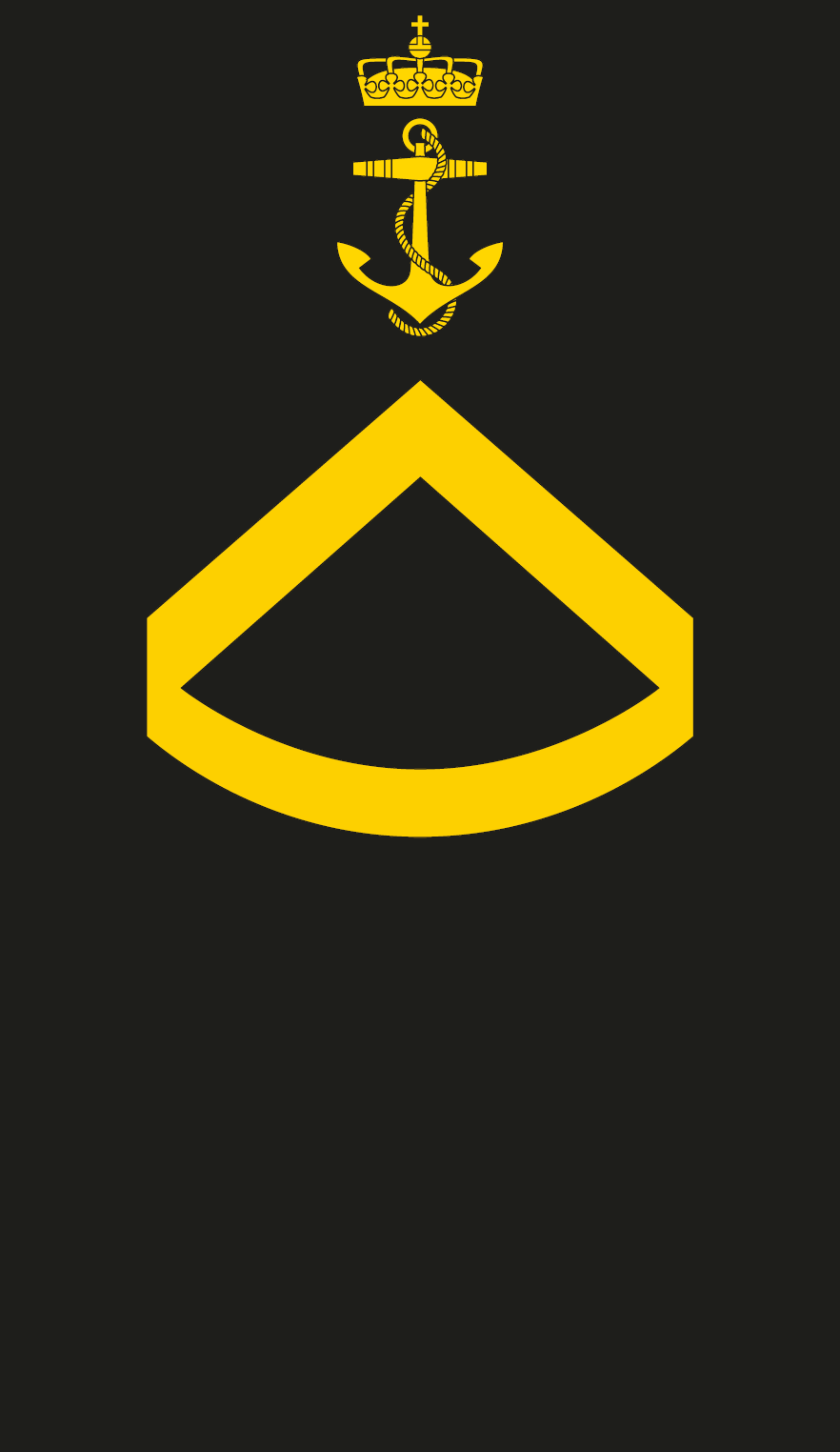
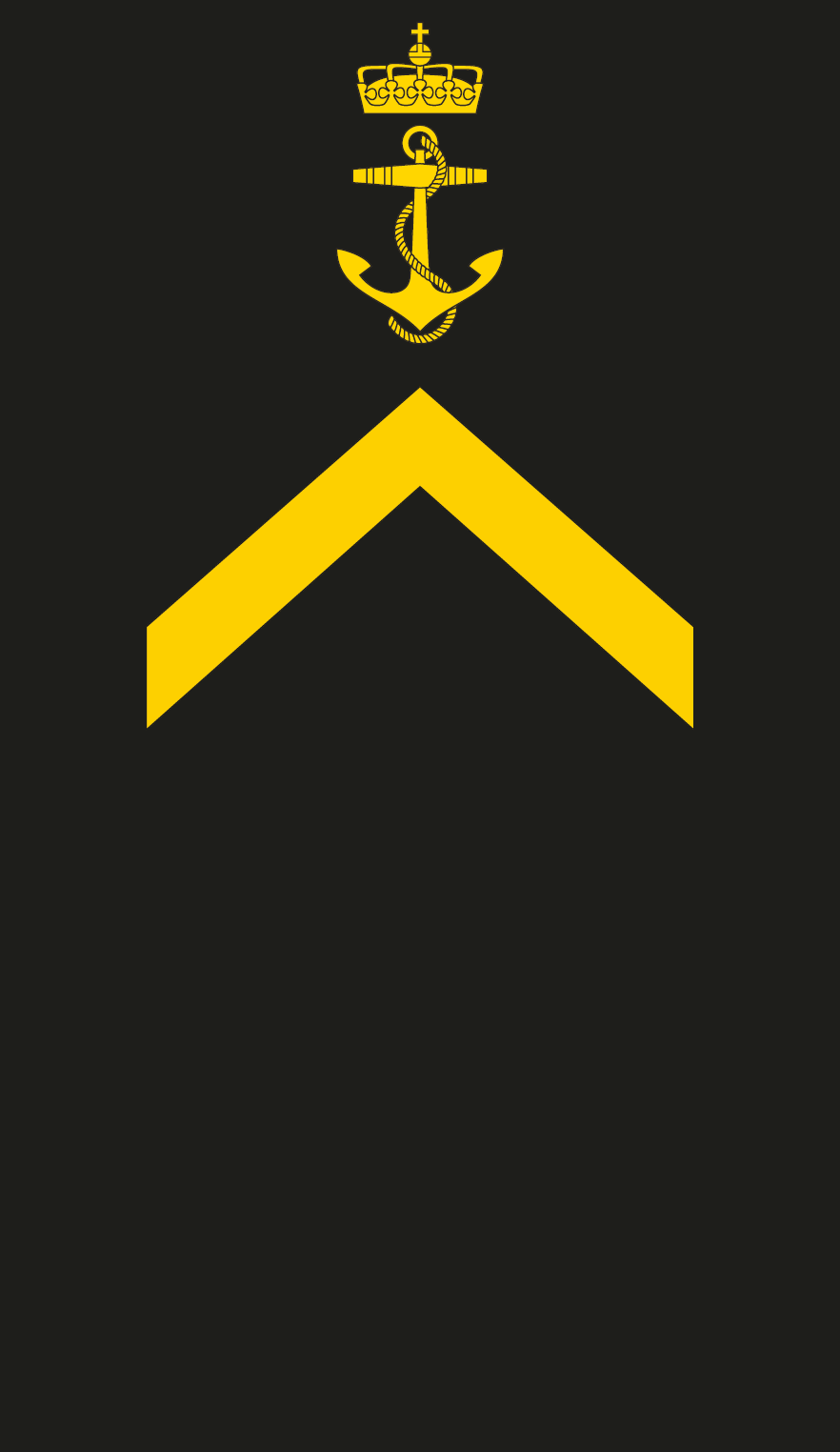
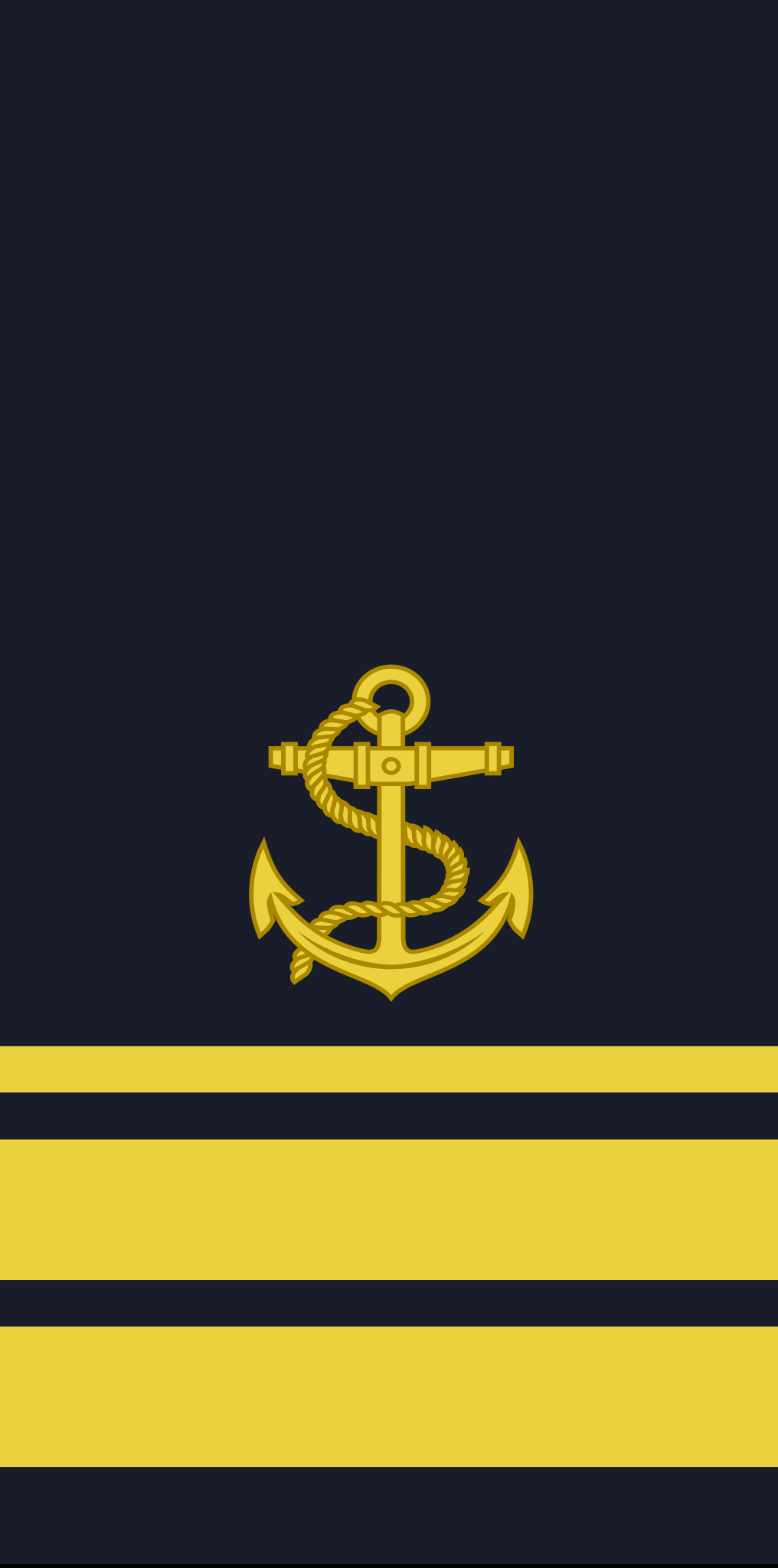
Rank group	Senior NCOs												Junior NCOs						Enlisted
Albanian Naval Force
Albanian Naval Force	Kryekapter			Kapter		Rreshter		Tetar		Nëntetar			Ushtar IV				Ushtar III		Ushtar II				Ushtar I
Austria	No navy
Belarus	No navy
Belgian Navy
Belgian Navy	Oppermeester-chef		Oppermeester	Eerste meesterchef		Eerste meester		Meester-chef	Meester	Tweede meester			Eerste kwartiermeester-chef		Kwartiermeester-chef		Kwartiermeester		Eerste matroos				Matroos
Belgian Navy	Maître principal-chef		Maître-principal	Premier-maître chef		Premier maître		Maître-chef	Maître	Second-maître			Premier quartier-maître-chef		Quartier-maître-chef		Quartier maître		Premier matelot				Matelot
Belgian Navy	Chefhauptmeister		Hauptmeister	Erster chefmeister		Erster meister		Meister-chef	Meister	Zweiter meister			Erster oberquartiermeister		Oberquartiermeister		Quartiermeister		Erster matrose				Matrose
Bosnia and Herzegovina	No navy
Bulgarian Navy
Bulgarian Navy	Офицерски кандидат Ofitserski kandidat			Мичман; Mičman		Главен старшина Glaven starshina		Старшина 1 степен Starshina 1 stepen		Старшина 2 степен Starshina 2 stepen			Старши матрос Starshi matros				Матрос; Matros
Croatian Navy																							No insignia
Croatian Navy	Časnički namjesnik			Stožerni narednik		Nadnarednik		Narednik		Desetnik			Skupnik				Razvodnik		Pozornik				Mornar
Cyprus Navy																							Arm/corps insignia only
Cyprus Navy	Ανθυπασπιστής; Anthypaspistís			Αρχικελευστής; Archikelefstís		Επικελευστής; Epikelefstís		Κελευστής; Kelefstís					Δίοπος; Díopos				Υποδίοπος; Ypodíopos						Ναύτης; Náftis
Czech Republic	No navy
Royal Danish Navy
Royal Danish Navy	Chefsergent			Seniorsergent		Oversergent				Sergent		Sergent SØ	Korporal				Marinespecialist		Marineoverkonstabel				Marinekonstabel
Estonian Navy
Estonian Navy	Ülemveebel		Staabiveebel	Vanemveebel		Veebel		Nooremveebel		Vanemmaat			Maat		Nooremmaat				Vanemmadrus				Madrus
French Navy
French Navy	Major		Maître principal	Premier maître				Maître		Second-maître			Quartier-maître de 1^{ère} classe				Quartier-maître de 2^{ème} classe		Matelot breveté				Matelot
Finnish Navy
Finnish Navy	Sotilasmestari			Ylipursimies		Pursimies		Ylikersantti		Kersantti			Alikersantti				Ylimatruusi		Matruusi
Finnish Navy	Militärmästare			Överbåtsman		Båtsman		Översergeant		Sergeant			Undersergeant				Övermatros		Matros
(Georgia (country)) Georgia	No navy
German Navy																							No insignia
German Navy	Oberstabsbootsmann			Stabsbootsmann		Hauptbootsmann		Oberbootsmann	Bootsmann	Obermaat		Maat	Stabskorporal	Korporal	Oberstabsgefreiter	Stabsgefreiter	Hauptgefreiter	Obergefreiter	Gefreiter				Matrose
German Navy (Officer designate)
German Navy (Officer designate)						Oberfähnrich zur See		Fähnrich zur See		Seekadett
Hellenic Navy													male		female								male	female
Hellenic Navy	Ανθυπασπιστής (Note: Greece has only one level of Warrant Officer. According to the current issue (2021) of STANAG 2116, the Greek Warrant Officers are included in OR-9, however they are afforded the privileges of an officer. See STANAG 2116 note 29, page D-9); Anthypaspistis			Αρχικελευστής; Archikelefstis		Επικελευστής; Epikelefstis		Κελευστής; Kelefstis					Δίοπος; Diopos										Ναύτης; Naftis
Rank group	Senior NCOs												Junior NCOs						Enlisted
Hungarian River Guard
Hungarian River Guard	Főtörzszászlós			Törzszászlós	Zászlós	Főtörzsőrmester		Törzsőrmester		Őrmester			Szakaszvezető				Tizedes		Őrvezető				Közkatona
Icelandic Coast Guard
Icelandic Coast Guard	Yfir Bátsmaður MS-3					Bátsmaður MS-2				Bátsmaður MS-1							AS-4		AS-3		Háseti AS-2		AS-1
Irish Naval Service																							No insignia
Irish Naval Service	Warrant officer Oifigeach barántais			Senior chief petty officer Ard-mhion-oifigeach sinsearach		Chief petty officer Ard-mhion-oifigeach		Senior petty officer Mion-oifigeach sinsearach		Petty officer Mion-oifigeach			Leading seaman Mairnéalach ceannais				Able seaman Mairnéalach inniúil		Ordinary seaman Mairnéalach				Seaman recruit Earcach
Italian Navy				Capo di prima classe / Capo di seconda classe / Capo di terza classe									Sottocapo aiutante / Sottocapo scelto / Sottocapo di prima classe / Sottocapo di seconda classe / Sottocapo di terza classe										No insignia
Italian Navy	Primo luogotenente	Luogotenente	Primo maresciallo	Capo di prima classe / Capo di seconda classe / Capo di terza classe		Secondo aiutante	Secondo capo scelto	Secondo capo		Sergente			Sottocapo aiutante / Sottocapo scelto / Sottocapo di prima classe / Sottocapo di seconda classe / Sottocapo di terza classe				Comune scelto		Comune di prima classe				Comune di seconda classe
Kosovo	No navy
Latvian Naval Forces
Latvian Naval Forces	Vecākais virsniekvietnieks			Virsniekvietnieks		Vecākais bocmanis		Bocmanis		Seržants			Kaprālis				Dižmatrozis		Matrozis
Liechtenstein	No navy
Lithuanian Naval Force
Lithuanian Naval Force	Vyresnysis laivūnas			Laivūnas		Štabo laivūnas		Vyresnysis seržantas		Seržantas			Grandinis				Vyresnysis jūreivis		Jūreivis				Jaunesnysis jūreivis
(Luxembourg) Luxemburg	No navy
North Macedonia	No navy
Maritime Squadron of Malta																			No insignia
Maritime Squadron of Malta	Warrant Officer Class 1			Warrant Officer Class 2		Staff Sergeant		Sergeant					Bombardier				Lance Bombardier		Gunner (or equivalent)
Moldova	No navy
Monaco	No navy
Montenegrin Navy
Montenegrin Navy	Zastavnik 1 klase			Zastavnik		Stariji vodnik 1 klase		Stariji vodnik		Vodnik 1 klase			Vodnik				Mlađi vodnik		Desetar				Razvodnik
Royal Netherlands Navy																							No insignia
Royal Netherlands Navy	Adjudant-onderofficier/ Opperschipper					Sergeant-majoor/ Schipper		Sergeant/ Bootsman					Korporaal/ Kwartiermeester						Matroos der 1e klasse		Matroos der 2e klasse		Matroos der 3e klasse
Royal Norwegian Navy
Royal Norwegian Navy	Flaggmester			Orlogsmester		Flotiljemester		Skvadronmester		Senior kvartermester		Kvartermester	Konstabel				Senior visekonstabel		Visekonstabel				Ledende menig	Menig
Polish Navy																								No insignia
Polish Navy	Starszy chorąży sztabowy marynarki		Starszy chorąży marynarki	Chorąży marynarki				Młodszy chorąży marynarki		Starszy bosman			Bosman				Bosmanmat	Starszy mat	Mat				Starszy marynarz	Marynarz
Rank group	Senior NCOs												Junior NCOs						Enlisted
Portuguese Navy																					No insignia		No insignia
Portuguese Navy	Sargento-mor		Sargento-chefe	Sargento-ajudante		Primeiro-sargento		Segundo-sargento		Subsargento			Cabo-mor		Cabo		Primeiro-marinheiro		Segundo-marinheiro		Primeiro-grumete		Segundo-grumete
Romanian Naval Forces																			No insignia
Romanian Naval Forces	Plutonier adjutant principal		Plutonier adjutant	Plutonier-major		Plutonier		Sergent-major		Sergent			Caporal clasa I	Caporal clasa a II-a	Caporal clasa a III-a		Fruntaș		Soldat
Russian Navy
Russian Navy	Старший мичман Starshy michman		Мичман; Michman	Главный корабельный старшина Glavny korabelny starshina		Главный старшина Glavny starshina		Старшина 1 статьи Starshina 1 statji		Старшина 2 статьи Starshina 2 statji			Старший матрос Starshy matros				Матрос; Matros
San Marino	No navy
Serbian River Flotilla
Serbian River Flotilla	Заставник I класе Zastavnik I klase			Заставник; Zastavnik		Старији Водник I класе Stariji Vodnik I klase		Старији Водник; Stariji Vodnik		Водник; Vodnik			Млађи водник Mlađi vodnik				Десетар; Desetar		Разводник; Razvodnik				Војник; Vojnik
Slovakia	No navy
Slovenia Navy
Slovenia Navy	Višji štabni praporščak	Štabni praporščak	Višji praporščak	Praporščak	Višji štabni vodnik	Štabni vodnik		Višji vodnik		Vodnik			Naddesetnik				Desetnik		Poddesetnik				Vojak
Spanish Navy
Spanish Navy	Suboficial mayor		Subteniente	Brigada		Sargento primero		Sargento		Cabo mayor			Cabo primero				Cabo		Marinero de primera				Marinero
Swedish Navy
Swedish Navy	Flottiljförvaltare			Förvaltare		Överfanjunkare	Fanjunkare	Översergeant	Sergeant	Överfurir		Furir	Korpral				Vicekorpral		Menig 4	Menig 3	Menig 2	Menig 1	Menig
Switzerland	No navy
Turkish Naval Forces																							No insignia
Turkish Naval Forces	Astsubay kıdemli başçavuş			Astsubay başçavuş		Astsubay kıdemli üstçavuş		Astsubay üstçavuş		Astsubay kıdemli çavuş	Astsubay çavuş	Astsubay astçavuş	Uzman çavuş		Çavuş		Uzman onbaşı	Onbaşı					Er
Ukrainian Navy
Ukrainian Navy	Головний майстер-старшина Holovnyy mayster-starshyna		Старший майстер-старшина Starshyy mayster-starshyna	Майстер-старшина; Mayster-starshyna		Штаб-старшина; Shtab-starshyna		Головний корабельний старшина Holovnyy korabelʹnyy starshyna		Головний старшина Holovnyy starshyna			Старшина 1-ої статті Starshyna 1-oyi statti				Старшина 2-ої статті Starshyna 2-oyi statti		Старший матрос Starshyy matros				Матрос; Matros
Royal Navy
Royal Navy	Warrant officer class 1			Warrant officer class 2		Chief petty officer		Petty officer					Leading rate						Able rate
Royal Marines																			No insignia
Royal Marines	Warrant officer class 1			Warrant officer class 2		Colour sergeant		Sergeant					Corporal				Lance corporal		Marine
Vatican City	No navy
Rank group	Senior NCOs												Junior NCOs						Enlisted

== See also ==
- Military rank
- Comparative navy enlisted ranks of the Americas
- Comparative navy enlisted ranks of Asia
- Ranks and insignia of NATO navies enlisted
