= Comparative navy enlisted ranks of the Americas =

Rank comparison chart of navies of North and South American states.

== Enlisted ==
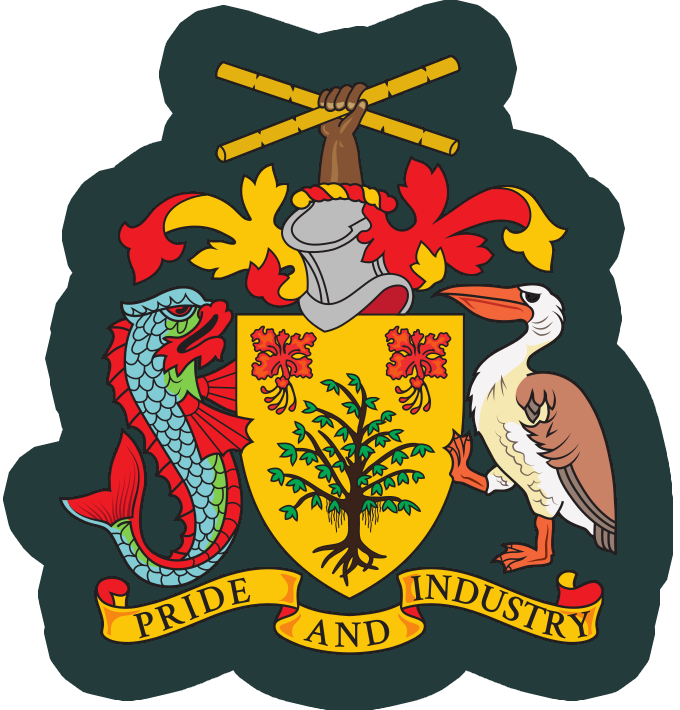
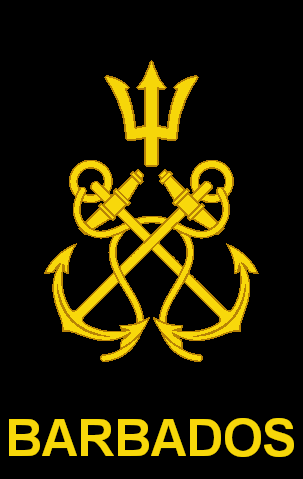
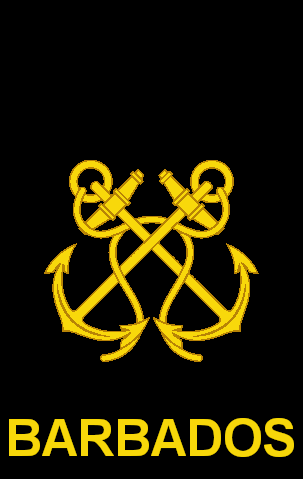
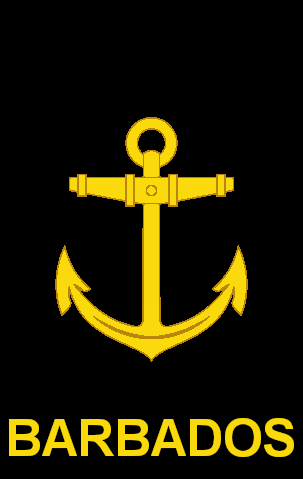
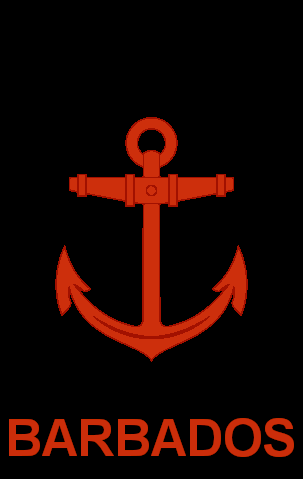
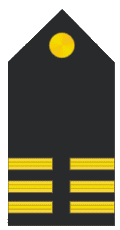
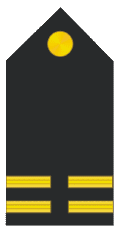
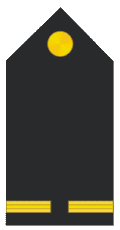
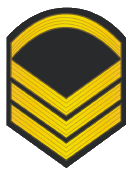
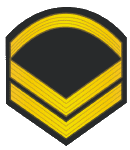
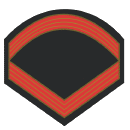
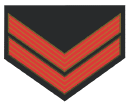
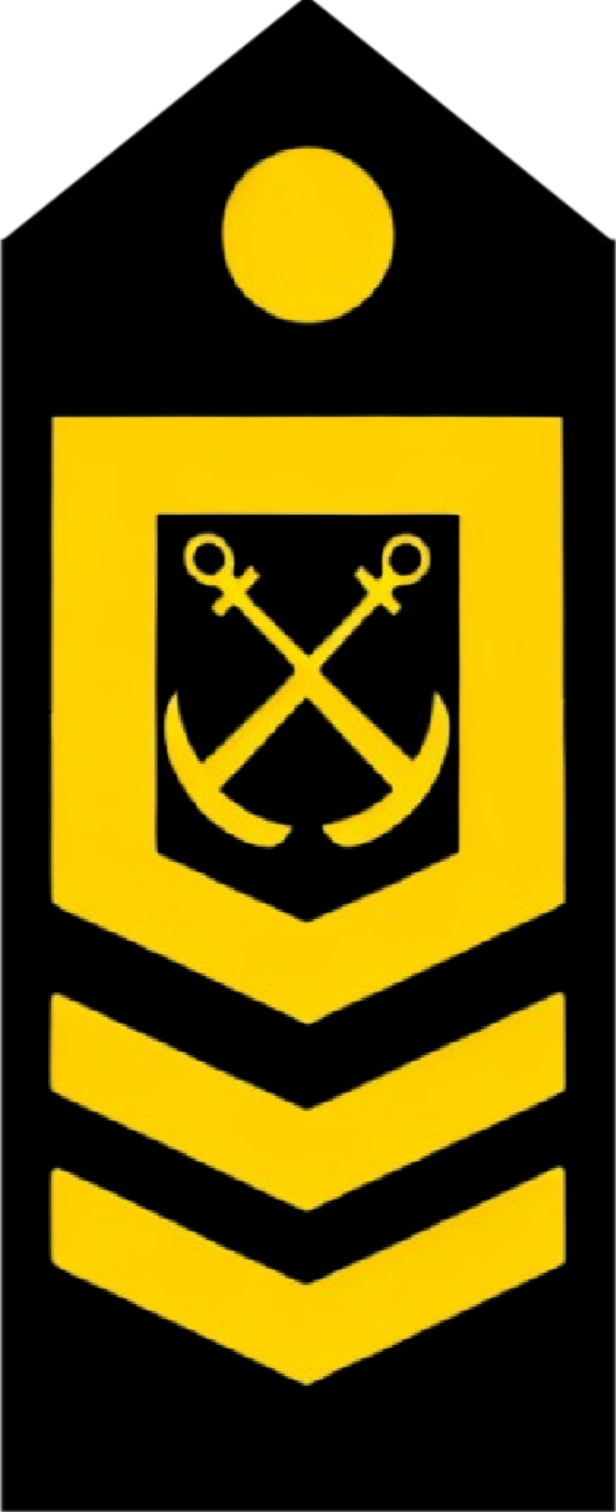
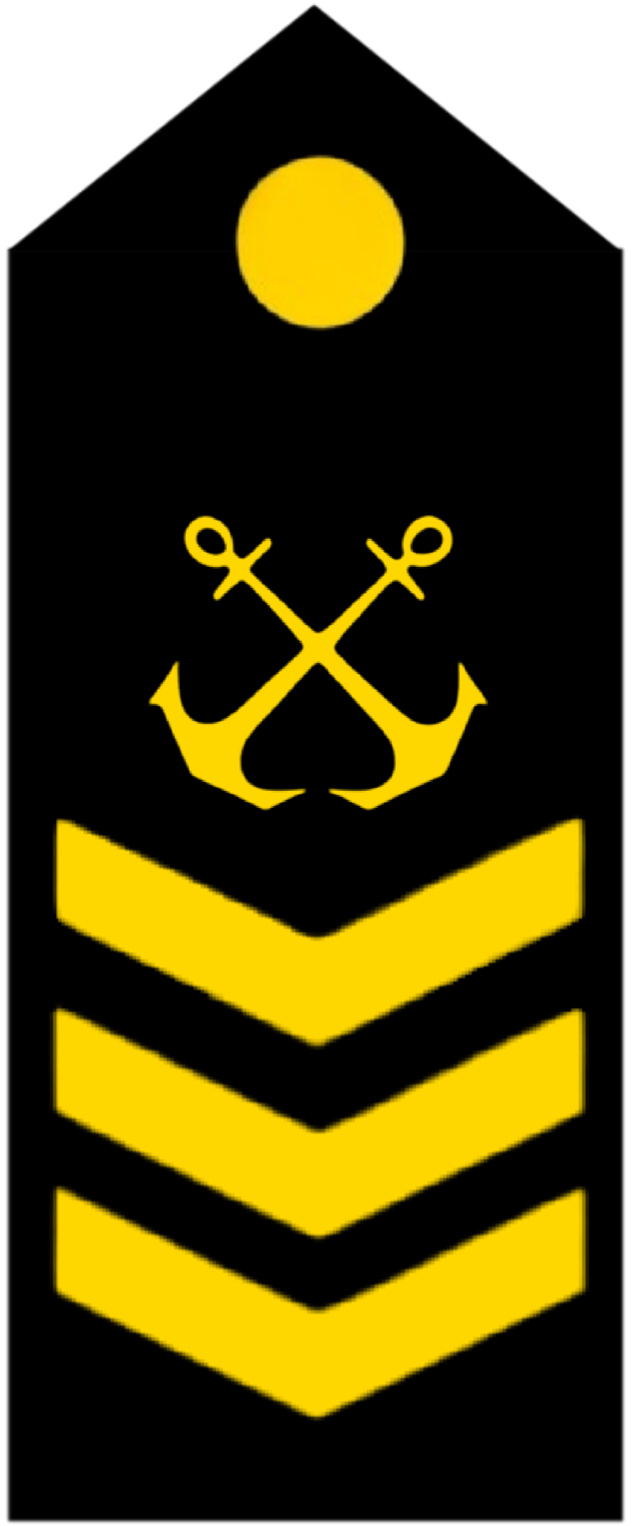
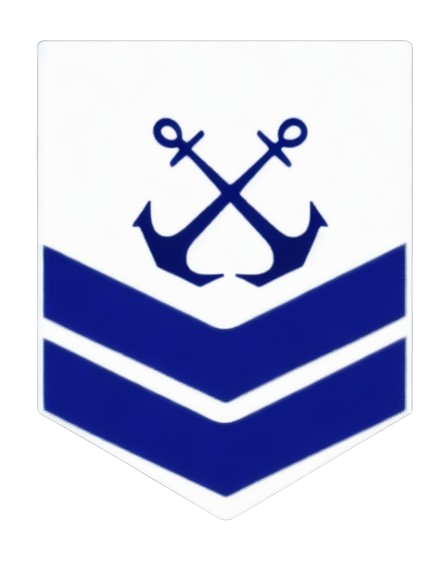
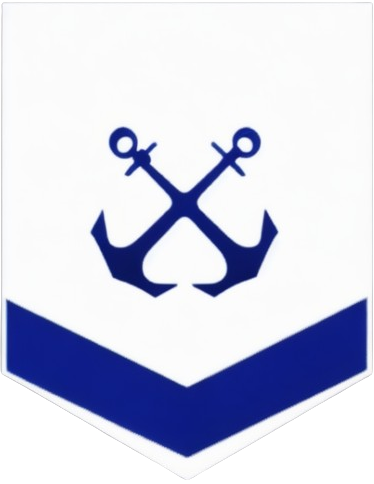
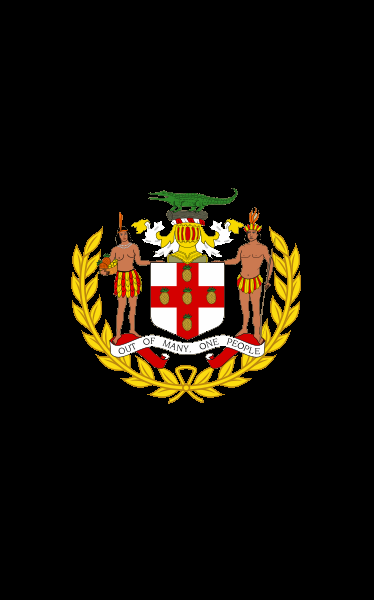
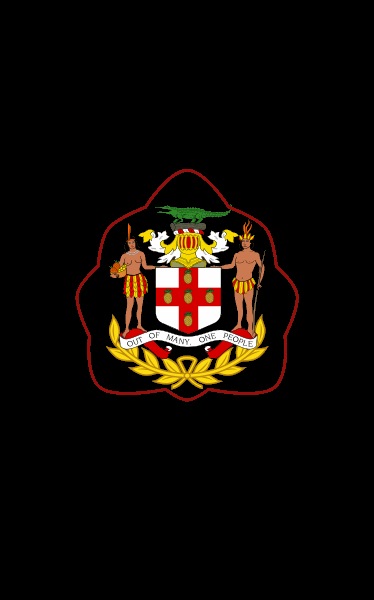
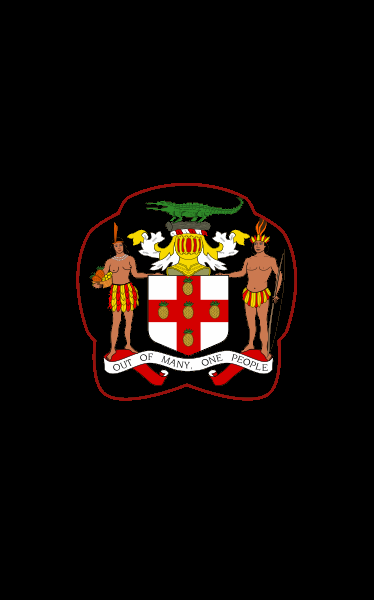
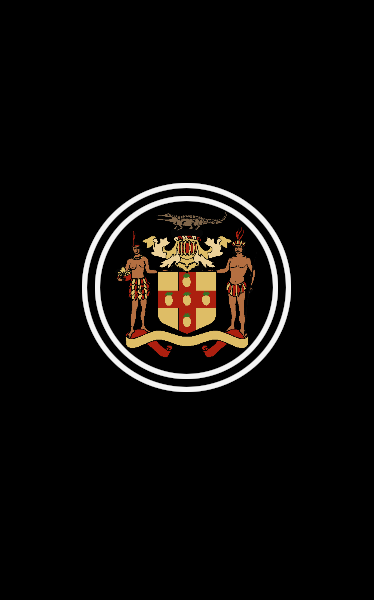
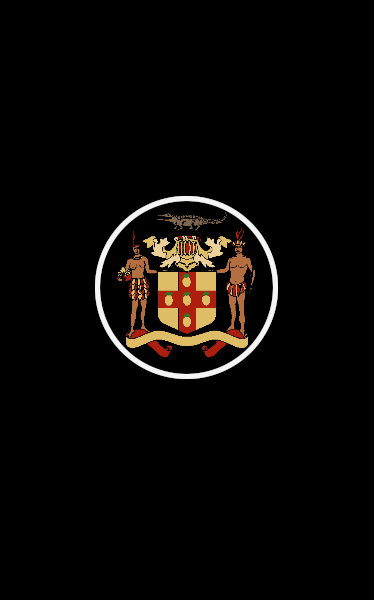
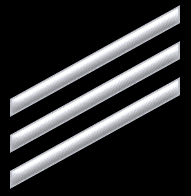
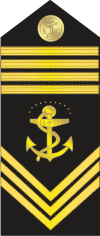
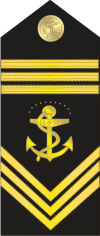
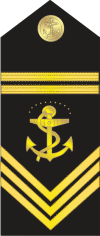
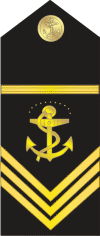
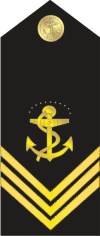
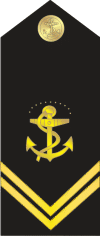
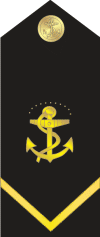
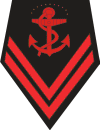
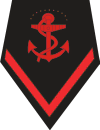
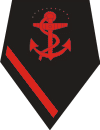
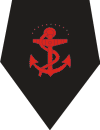
Rank group	Senior NCOs										Junior NCOs		Enlisted
Antigua and Barbuda Coast Guard
Antigua and Barbuda Coast Guard	Master chief petty officer class 1			Master chief petty officer class 2		Chief petty officer	Petty officer				Leading seaman		Able seaman
Argentine Navy
Argentine Navy	Suboficial mayor			Suboficial principal		Suboficial primero	Suboficial segundo		Cabo principal		Cabo primero	Cabo segundo	Marinero primero	Marinero segundo
Royal Bahamas Defence Force														No insignia
Royal Bahamas Defence Force	Force chief petty officer					Chief petty officer	Petty officer				Leading marine		Able marine	Marine
Barbados Coast Guard														No insignia
Barbados Coast Guard	Master chief petty officer class 1			Master chief petty officer class 2		Chief petty officer	Petty officer				Leading seaman		Able seaman	Seaman
Belize Coast Guard
Belize Coast Guard	Master chief petty officer			Senior chief petty officer		Chief petty officer	Petty officer first class		Petty officer second class		Petty officer third class	Seaman	Seaman apprentice
Bolivian Navy														No insignia
Bolivian Navy	Sub-oficial maestre	Sub-oficial mayor	Sub-oficial primero	Sub-oficial segundo		Sub-oficial inicial	Sargento primero		Sargento segundo		Sargento inicial	Cabo conscripto	Marinero de primero	Marinero de segunda
Brazilian Navy
Brazilian Navy	Suboficial						Primeiro-sargento		Segundo-sargento	Terceiro-sargento	Cabo		Marinheiro
Royal Canadian Navy
Royal Canadian Navy	Chief petty officer 1st class			Chief petty officer 2nd class		Petty officer 1st class	Petty officer 2nd class				Master sailor	Sailor 1st class	Sailor 2nd class	Sailor 3rd class
Royal Canadian Navy	Premier(ère) maître de 1^{re} classe			Premier(ère) maître de 2^{e} classe		Maître de 1^{re} classe	Maître de 2^{e} classe				Matelot-chef	Matelot de 1^{re} classe	Matelot de 2^{e} classe	Matelot de 3^{e} classe
Chilean Navy
Chilean Navy	Suboficial mayor			Suboficial		Sargento primero			Sargento segundo		Cabo primero	Cabo segundo	Marinero primero	Marinero segundo
Colombian National Navy
Colombian National Navy	Suboficial jefe técnico de comando conjunto		Suboficial jefe técnico de comando	Suboficial jefe técnico		Suboficial jefe	Suboficial primero		Suboficial segundo		Suboficial tercero	Marinero primero	Marinero segundo
Rank group	Senior NCOs										Junior NCOs		Enlisted
Costa Rica	No navy
Cuban Revolutionary Navy													No insignia	No insignia
Cuban Revolutionary Navy	Suboficial mayor	Primer suboficial	Segundo suboficial	Suboficial		Sargento primero	Sargento de segunda		Sargento de tercera			Cabo	Marinero de primera	Marinero
Dominica	No navy
Dominican Navy
Dominican Navy				Sargentos mayores			Sargentos					Cabos	Marineros especialista
Ecuadorian Navy
Ecuadorian Navy	Sub-oficial mayor		Sub-oficial primero	Sub-oficial segundo		Sargento primero			Sargento segundo		Cabo primero	Cabo segundo	Marinero	Grumete 2do año	Grumete 1er año
Navy of El Salvador														No insignia
Navy of El Salvador	Maestre de flota	Maestre mayor	Maestre primero	Maestre		Sargento primero maestro	Sargento maestro		Subsargento maestro			Cabo maestro		Marinero
Grenada	No navy
Guatemalan Navy
Guatemalan Navy	Maestre mayor			Maestre técnico		Maestre especialista			Contra maestre			Marinero de primera	Marinero de segundo	Marinero de tercera
Guyana Coast Guard
Guyana Coast Guard	Fleet chief petty officer			Chief petty officer		Senior petty officer	Petty officer				Leading seaman		Able seaman
Haitian Navy
Honduran Navy														No insignia
Honduran Navy						Contramaestre I	Contramaestre II		Contramaestre III			Cabo de cubierta		Marino de cubierta
Jamaican Coast Guard														No insignia
Jamaican Coast Guard	Master chief petty officer 1			Master chief petty officer		Chief petty officer	Petty officer				Leading seaman		Able seaman	Ordinary seaman
Mexican Navy
Mexican Navy						Segundo maestre			Tercer maestre			Cabo		Marinero
Rank group	Senior NCOs										Junior NCOs		Enlisted
Nicaraguan Navy														No insignia
Nicaraguan Navy						Sargento primero	Sargento segundo		Sargento tercero				Marino de primera	Marino
Panama	No navy
Paraguayan Navy														No insignia
Paraguayan Navy	Sub-oficial principal		Sub-oficial mayor			Sub-oficial de primera	Sub-oficial de segunda		Maestre		Cabo primero	Cabo segundo		Dragoneante
Peruvian Navy												No insignia		No insignia
Peruvian Navy	Oficial de mar primero		Oficial de mar segundo	Oficial de mar tercero		Cabo primero	Cabo segundo					Marinero		Grumete
Saint Kitts and Nevis Coast Guard
Saint Kitts and Nevis Coast Guard	Warrant officer class 1			Warrant officer class 2		Chief petty officer	Petty officer				Leading rate		Able rate
Saint Lucia	No navy
Saint Vincent and the Grenadines	No navy
Trinidad and Tobago Coast Guard													No insignia	No insignia
Trinidad and Tobago Coast Guard	Fleet chief petty officer			Chief petty officer			Petty officer				Leading seaman		Able seaman	Ordinary seaman
United States Navy														No insignia
United States Navy	Command master chief petty officer		Master chief petty officer	Command senior chief petty officer	Senior chief petty officer	Chief petty officer	Petty officer first class		Petty officer second class		Petty officer third class	Seaman	Seaman apprentice	Seaman recruit
U.S. Coast Guard
U.S. Coast Guard	Command master chief petty officer		Master chief petty officer	Senior chief petty officer		Chief petty officer	Petty officer first class		Petty officer second class		Petty officer third class	Seaman	Seaman apprentice	Seaman recruit
United States Marine Corps														No insignia
United States Marine Corps	Sergeant major		Master gunnery sergeant	First sergeant	Master sergeant	Gunnery sergeant	Staff sergeant		Sergeant		Corporal	Lance corporal	Private first class	Private
National Navy of Uruguay														No insignia
National Navy of Uruguay	Sub-oficial de cargo					Sub-oficial de primera	Sub-oficial de segunda				Cabo de primera	Cabo de segunda		Marinero de primera	Aprendiz
Bolivarian Navy of Venezuela
Bolivarian Navy of Venezuela	Sargento supervisor		Sargento ayudante	Sargento mayor de primera		Sargento mayor de segunda	Sargento mayor de tercera	Sargento primero	Sargento segundo		Cabo primero	Cabo segundo	Distinguido	Marinero raso
Rank group	Senior NCOs										Junior NCOs		Enlisted

== See also ==
- Comparative navy enlisted ranks of Asia
- Comparative navy enlisted ranks of Europe
- Ranks and insignia of NATO navies officers
