= Senior petty officer =

Irish naval rank

The shoulder sleeve insignia of an Irish Naval Service Senior petty officer.

Senior petty officer is a non-commissioned officer rank in the Irish Naval Service (Irish: Ard-Mhion-Oifigeach Sinsearach). The rank is deemed equivalent to a member of the NATO armed forces ranked E-6, making it the equivalent of a Petty officer First Class in the US Navy or Petty officer in the Royal Navy. The rank is one grade below an Irish Chief petty officer and one above Petty officer.
